= List of municipalities in the Czech Republic =

This is a list of municipalities in the Czech Republic. Every name is followed by the official status and the district in which it is located.

== A ==
- Abertamy (town; Karlovy Vary)
- Adamov (town; Blansko)
- Adamov (České Budějovice)
- Adamov (Kutná Hora)
- Adršpach (Náchod)
- Albrechtice (Karviná)
- Albrechtice (Ústí nad Orlicí)
- Albrechtice nad Orlicí (Rychnov nad Kněžnou)
- Albrechtice nad Vltavou (Písek)
- Albrechtice v Jizerských horách (Jablonec nad Nisou)
- Albrechtičky (Nový Jičín)
- Alojzov (Prostějov)
- Andělská Hora (town; Bruntál)
- Andělská Hora (Karlovy Vary)
- Anenská Studánka (Ústí nad Orlicí)
- Archlebov (Hodonín)
- Arneštovice (Pelhřimov)
- Arnolec (Jihlava)
- Arnoltice (Děčín)
- Aš (town; Cheb)

== B ==
- Babice (Hradec Králové)
- Babice (Olomouc)
- Babice (Prague-East)
- Babice (Prachatice)
- Babice (Třebíč)
- Babice (Uherské Hradiště)
- Babice nad Svitavou (Brno-Country)
- Babice u Rosic (Brno-Country)
- Babylon (Domažlice)
- Bácovice (Pelhřimov)
- Bačalky (Jičín)
- Bačetín (Rychnov nad Kněžnou)
- Bačice (Třebíč)
- Bačkov (Havlíčkův Brod)
- Bačkovice (Třebíč)
- Bakov nad Jizerou (town; Mladá Boleslav)
- Baliny (Žďár nad Sázavou)
- Balkova Lhota (Tábor)
- Banín (Svitavy)
- Bánov (Uherské Hradiště)
- Báňovice (Jindřichův Hradec)
- Bantice (Znojmo)
- Barchov (Hradec Králové)
- Barchov (Pardubice)
- Barchovice (Kolín)
- Bartošovice v Orlických horách (Rychnov nad Kněžnou)
- Bartošovice (Nový Jičín)
- Bartoušov (Havlíčkův Brod)
- Bařice-Velké Těšany (Kroměříž)
- Baška (Frýdek-Místek)
- Bašnice (Jičín)
- Bašť (Prague-East)
- Batelov (market town; Jihlava)
- Batňovice (Trutnov)
- Bavorov (town; Strakonice)
- Bavory (Břeclav)
- Bavoryně (Beroun)
- Bdeněves (Plzeň-North)
- Bdín (Rakovník)
- Běchary (Jičín)
- Bechlín (Litoměřice)
- Bechyně (town; Tábor)
- Bečice (České Budějovice)
- Bečice (Tábor)
- Bečov nad Teplou (town; Karlovy Vary)
- Bečov (Most)
- Bečváry (Kolín)
- Bedihošť (Prostějov)
- Bednárec (Jindřichův Hradec)
- Bednáreček (Jindřichův Hradec)
- Bedřichov (Blansko)
- Bedřichov (Jablonec nad Nisou)
- Běhařov (Klatovy)
- Běhařovice (market town; Znojmo)
- Bělá (Havlíčkův Brod)
- Bělá (Opava)
- Bělá (Pelhřimov)
- Bělá (Semily)
- Bělá nad Radbuzou (town; Domažlice)
- Bělá nad Svitavou (Svitavy)
- Bělá pod Bezdězem (town; Mladá Boleslav)
- Bělá pod Pradědem (Jeseník)
- Bělá u Jevíčka (Svitavy)
- Bělčice (town; Strakonice)
- Běleč (Brno-Country)
- Běleč (Kladno)
- Běleč (Tábor)
- Běleč nad Orlicí (Hradec Králové)
- Bělkovice-Lašťany (Olomouc)
- Běloky (Kladno)
- Bělotín (Přerov)
- Bělov (Kroměříž)
- Bělušice (Kolín)
- Bělušice (Most)
- Benátky (Hradec Králové)
- Benátky (Svitavy)
- Benátky nad Jizerou (town; Mladá Boleslav)
- Benecko (Semily)
- Benešov (town; Benešov)
- Benešov (Blansko)
- Benešov nad Černou (Český Krumlov)
- Benešov nad Ploučnicí (town; Děčín)
- Benešov u Semil (Semily)
- Benešovice (Tachov)
- Benetice (Třebíč)
- Benetice (Havlíčkův Brod)
- Beňov (Přerov)
- Bernardov (Kutná Hora)
- Bernartice (Benešov)
- Bernartice (Jeseník)
- Bernartice (market town; Písek)
- Bernartice (Trutnov)
- Bernartice nad Odrou (Nový Jičín)
- Beroun (town; Beroun)
- Běrunice (Nymburk)
- Beřovice (Kladno)
- Besednice (market town; Český Krumlov)
- Běstovice (Ústí nad Orlicí)
- Běstvina (Chrudim)
- Běšiny (Klatovy)
- Běštín (Beroun)
- Bezděčí u Trnávky (Svitavy)
- Bezdědovice (Strakonice)
- Bezděkov (Havlíčkův Brod)
- Bezděkov (Klatovy)
- Bezděkov (Pardubice)
- Bezděkov (Rokycany)
- Bezděkov nad Metují (Náchod)
- Bezděkov pod Třemšínem (Příbram)
- Bezděz (Česká Lípa)
- Bezdružice (town; Tachov)
- Bezkov (Znojmo)
- Bezměrov (Kroměříž)
- Bezno (market town; Mladá Boleslav)
- Bezuchov (Přerov)
- Bezvěrov (Plzeň-North)
- Bílá (Frýdek-Místek)
- Bílá (Liberec)
- Bílá Hlína (Mladá Boleslav)
- Bílá Lhota (Olomouc)
- Bílá Třemešná (Trutnov)
- Bílá Voda (Jeseník)
- Bílčice (Bruntál)
- Bílé Podolí (market town; Kutná Hora)
- Bílé Poličany (Trutnov)
- Bílence (Chomutov)
- Bílichov (Kladno)
- Bílina (town; Teplice)
- Bílkovice (Benešov)
- Bílov (Nový Jičín)
- Bílov (Plzeň-North)
- Bílovec (town; Nový Jičín)
- Bílovice-Lutotín (Prostějov)
- Bílovice nad Svitavou (Brno-Country)
- Bílovice (Uherské Hradiště)
- Bílsko (Olomouc)
- Bílsko (Strakonice)
- Bílsko u Hořic (Jičín)
- Bílý Kámen (Jihlava)
- Bílý Kostel nad Nisou (Liberec)
- Bílý Potok (Liberec)
- Bílý Újezd (Rychnov nad Kněžnou)
- Biřkov (Klatovy)
- Biskoupky (Brno-Country)
- Biskupice-Pulkov (Třebíč)
- Biskupice (Chrudim)
- Biskupice (Prostějov)
- Biskupice (Svitavy)
- Biskupice (Zlín)
- Bítouchov (Mladá Boleslav)
- Bítov (Nový Jičín)
- Bítov (Znojmo)
- Bítovany (Chrudim)
- Bítovčice (Jihlava)
- Bitozeves (Louny)
- Blanné (Znojmo)
- Blansko (town; Blansko)
- Blatce (Česká Lípa)
- Blatec (Olomouc)
- Blatná (town; Strakonice)
- Blatnice (Plzeň-North)
- Blatnice (Třebíč)
- Blatnice pod Svatým Antonínkem (Hodonín)
- Blatnička (Hodonín)
- Blatno (Chomutov)
- Blatno (Louny)
- Blazice (Kroměříž)
- Blažejov (Jindřichův Hradec)
- Blažejovice (Benešov)
- Blažim (Louny)
- Blažim (Plzeň-North)
- Blažkov (Žďár nad Sázavou)
- Blažovice (Brno-Country)
- Blešno (Hradec Králové)
- Blevice (Kladno)
- Blízkov (Žďár nad Sázavou)
- Blížejov (Domažlice)
- Blíževedly (Česká Lípa)
- Blížkovice (market town; Znojmo)
- Blovice (town; Plzeň-South)
- Blšany u Loun (Louny)
- Blšany (town; Louny)
- Blučina (Brno-Country)
- Bludov (Kutná Hora)
- Bludov (Šumperk)
- Bobnice (Nymburk)
- Bobrová (market town; Žďár nad Sázavou)
- Bobrůvka (Žďár nad Sázavou)
- Bocanovice (Frýdek-Místek)
- Bochoř (Přerov)
- Bochov (town; Karlovy Vary)
- Bochovice (Třebíč)
- Boháňka (Jičín)
- Boharyně (Hradec Králové)
- Bohaté Málkovice (Vyškov)
- Bohatice (Česká Lípa)
- Bohdalec (Žďár nad Sázavou)
- Bohdalice-Pavlovice (Vyškov)
- Bohdalín (Pelhřimov)
- Bohdalov (market town; Žďár nad Sázavou)
- Bohdalovice (Český Krumlov)
- Bohdaneč (Kutná Hora)
- Bohdašín (Rychnov nad Kněžnou)
- Bohdíkov (Šumperk)
- Bohostice (Příbram)
- Bohumilice (Prachatice)
- Bohumín (town; Karviná)
- Bohunice (Prachatice)
- Bohuňov (Svitavy)
- Bohuňov (Žďár nad Sázavou)
- Bohuňovice (Olomouc)
- Bohuňovice (Svitavy)
- Bohuslavice (Jihlava)
- Bohuslavice (Náchod)
- Bohuslavice (Opava)
- Bohuslavice (Prostějov)
- Bohuslavice (Šumperk)
- Bohuslavice nad Vláří (Zlín)
- Bohuslavice u Zlína (Zlín)
- Bohuslávky (Přerov)
- Bohušice (Třebíč)
- Bohušov (Bruntál)
- Bohušovice nad Ohří (town; Litoměřice)
- Bohutice (Znojmo)
- Bohutín (Příbram)
- Bohutín (Šumperk)
- Bohy (Plzeň-North)
- Bojanov (market town; Chrudim)
- Bojanovice (Prague-West)
- Bojanovice (Znojmo)
- Bojiště (Havlíčkův Brod)
- Bojkovice (town; Uherské Hradiště)
- Bolatice (Opava)
- Boleboř (Chomutov)
- Bolehošť (Rychnov nad Kněžnou)
- Boleradice (market town; Břeclav)
- Bolešiny (Klatovy)
- Bolkov (Plzeň-South)
- Boňkov (Havlíčkův Brod)
- Bor u Skutče (Chrudim)
- Bor (town; Tachov)
- Borač (Brno-Country)
- Bordovice (Nový Jičín)
- Boreč (Mladá Boleslav)
- Borek (České Budějovice)
- Borek (Havlíčkův Brod)
- Borek (Jičín)
- Borek (Mělník)
- Borek (Pardubice)
- Borkovany (Břeclav)
- Borkovice (Tábor)
- Borohrádek (town; Rychnov nad Kněžnou)
- Borotice (Příbram)
- Borotice (Znojmo)
- Borotín (Blansko)
- Borotín (market town; Tábor)
- Borová (Náchod)
- Borová (Svitavy)
- Borová Lada (Prachatice)
- Borovany (town; České Budějovice)
- Borovany (Písek)
- Borovná (Jihlava)
- Borovnice (Benešov)
- Borovnice (České Budějovice)
- Borovnice (Rychnov nad Kněžnou)
- Borovnice (Trutnov)
- Borovnice (Žďár nad Sázavou)
- Borovnička (Trutnov)
- Borovník (Brno-Country)
- Borovno (Plzeň-South)
- Borovy (Klatovy)
- Boršice u Blatnice (Uherské Hradiště)
- Boršice (Uherské Hradiště)
- Boršov nad Vltavou (České Budějovice)
- Boršov (Jihlava)
- Borušov (Svitavy)
- Bory (Žďár nad Sázavou)
- Bořanovice (Prague-East)
- Bořenovice (Kroměříž)
- Bořetice (Břeclav)
- Bořetice (Pelhřimov)
- Bořetín (Jindřichův Hradec)
- Bořetín (Pelhřimov)
- Bořice (Chrudim)
- Bořislav (Teplice)
- Bořitov (Blansko)
- Boseň (Mladá Boleslav)
- Boskovice (town; Blansko)
- Boskovštejn (Znojmo)
- Bošice (Prachatice)
- Bošilec (České Budějovice)
- Bošín (Ústí nad Orlicí)
- Bošovice (Vyškov)
- Boudy (Písek)
- Bousín (Prostějov)
- Bousov (Chrudim)
- Bouzov (Olomouc)
- Bozkov (Semily)
- Božanov (Náchod)
- Božejov (market town; Pelhřimov)
- Božetice (Písek)
- Boží Dar (town; Karlovy Vary)
- Božice (Znojmo)
- Božičany (Karlovy Vary)
- Brada-Rybníček (Jičín)
- Bradáčov (Tábor)
- Bradlec (Mladá Boleslav)
- Bradlecká Lhota (Semily)
- Brambory (Kutná Hora)
- Braňany (Most)
- Brandov (Most)
- Brandýs nad Labem-Stará Boleslav (town; Prague-East)
- Brandýs nad Orlicí (town; Ústí nad Orlicí)
- Brandýsek (Kladno)
- Branice (Písek)
- Braníškov (Brno-Country)
- Branišov (České Budějovice)
- Branišovice (Brno-Country)
- Branka u Opavy (Opava)
- Brankovice (market town; Vyškov)
- Branky (Vsetín)
- Branná (Šumperk)
- Branov (Rakovník)
- Bransouze (Třebíč)
- Brantice (Bruntál)
- Branžež (Mladá Boleslav)
- Braškov (Kladno)
- Břasy (Rokycany)
- Bratčice (Brno-Country)
- Bratčice (Kutná Hora)
- Bratkovice (Příbram)
- Bratronice (Kladno)
- Bratronice (Strakonice)
- Bratrušov (Šumperk)
- Bratřejov (Zlín)
- Bratřice (Pelhřimov)
- Bratříkovice (Opava)
- Bratřínov (Prague-West)
- Bravantice (Nový Jičín)
- Brázdim (Prague-East)
- Břeclav (town; Břeclav)
- Břehov (České Budějovice)
- Břehy (Pardubice)
- Břest (Kroměříž)
- Břestek (Uherské Hradiště)
- Břevnice (Havlíčkův Brod)
- Březejc (Žďár nad Sázavou)
- Březí (Břeclav)
- Březí (Prague-East)
- Březí (Strakonice)
- Březí (Žďár nad Sázavou)
- Březí nad Oslavou (Žďár nad Sázavou)
- Březina (Brno-Country, formerly Blansko)
- Březina (Brno-Country, formerly Tišnov)
- Březina (Jičín)
- Březina (Jindřichův Hradec)
- Březina (Mladá Boleslav)
- Březina (Rokycany)
- Březina (Svitavy)
- Březinky (Svitavy)
- Březiny (Svitavy)
- Březnice (town; Příbram)
- Březnice (Tábor)
- Březnice (Zlín)
- Březník (Třebíč)
- Březno (Chomutov)
- Březno (market town; Mladá Boleslav)
- Březolupy (Uherské Hradiště)
- Březová-Oleško (Prague-West)
- Březová (Beroun)
- Březová (Karlovy Vary)
- Březová (market town; Opava)
- Březová (town; Sokolov)
- Březová (Uherské Hradiště)
- Březová (Zlín)
- Březová nad Svitavou (town; Svitavy)
- Březovice (Mladá Boleslav)
- Březské (Žďár nad Sázavou)
- Březsko (Prostějov)
- Březůvky (Zlín)
- Břežany (Klatovy)
- Břežany (Rakovník)
- Břežany (Znojmo)
- Břežany I (Kolín)
- Břežany II (Kolín)
- Břidličná (town; Bruntál)
- Bříství (Nymburk)
- Bříšťany (Jičín)
- Bříza (Litoměřice)
- Brloh (Český Krumlov)
- Brloh (Pardubice)
- Brňany (Litoměřice)
- Brněnec (Svitavy)
- Brníčko (Šumperk)
- Brnířov (Domažlice)
- Brniště (Česká Lípa)
- Brno (city; Brno-City)
- Brod nad Dyjí (Břeclav)
- Brod nad Tichou (Tachov)
- Brodce (market town; Mladá Boleslav)
- Brodec (Louny)
- Brodek u Konice (Prostějov)
- Brodek u Přerova (market town; Přerov)
- Brodek u Prostějova (market town; Prostějov)
- Brodeslavy (Plzeň-North)
- Broumov (town; Náchod)
- Broumov (Tachov)
- Broumy (Beroun)
- Brozany nad Ohří (market town; Litoměřice)
- Brtnice (town; Jihlava)
- Brtnička (Třebíč)
- Brťov-Jeneč (Blansko)
- Brumov (Brno-Country)
- Brumov-Bylnice (town; Zlín)
- Brumovice (Břeclav)
- Brumovice (Opava)
- Bruntál (town; Bruntál)
- Brusné (Kroměříž)
- Brušperk (town; Frýdek-Místek)
- Bruzovice (Frýdek-Místek)
- Břvany (Louny)
- Brzánky (Litoměřice)
- Brzice (Náchod)
- Brzkov (Jihlava)
- Bublava (Sokolov)
- Bubovice (Beroun)
- Buchlovice (market town; Uherské Hradiště)
- Bučí (Plzeň-North)
- Bučina (Ústí nad Orlicí)
- Bučovice (town; Vyškov)
- Budčeves (Jičín)
- Budeč (Jindřichův Hradec)
- Budeč (Žďár nad Sázavou)
- Budětice (Klatovy)
- Budětsko (Prostějov)
- Budíkov (Pelhřimov)
- Budiměřice (Nymburk)
- Budislav (Svitavy)
- Budislav (Tábor)
- Budíškovice (Jindřichův Hradec)
- Budišov nad Budišovkou (town; Opava)
- Budišov (market town; Třebíč)
- Budišovice (Opava)
- Budkov (Prachatice)
- Budkov (Třebíč)
- Budyně nad Ohří (town; Litoměřice)
- Budyně (Strakonice)
- Bujanov (Český Krumlov)
- Bujesily (Rokycany)
- Buk (Prachatice)
- Buk (Přerov)
- Bukov (Žďár nad Sázavou)
- Buková (Plzeň-South)
- Buková (Prostějov)
- Buková u Příbramě (Příbram)
- Bukovany (Benešov)
- Bukovany (Hodonín)
- Bukovany (Olomouc)
- Bukovany (Příbram)
- Bukovany (Sokolov)
- Bukovec (Frýdek-Místek)
- Bukovec (Plzeň-South)
- Bukovice (Brno-Country)
- Bukovice (Náchod)
- Bukovina nad Labem (Pardubice)
- Bukovina u Čisté (Semily)
- Bukovina u Přelouče (Pardubice)
- Bukovina (Blansko)
- Bukovinka (Blansko)
- Bukovka (Pardubice)
- Bukovník (Klatovy)
- Bukovno (Mladá Boleslav)
- Bukvice (Jičín)
- Bulhary (Břeclav)
- Bulovka (Liberec)
- Buřenice (Pelhřimov)
- Buš (Prague-West)
- Bušanovice (Prachatice)
- Bušín (Šumperk)
- Bušovice (Rokycany)
- Buštěhrad (town; Kladno)
- Butoves (Jičín)
- Buzice (Strakonice)
- Býčkovice (Litoměřice)
- Býchory (Kolín)
- Býkev (Mělník)
- Bykoš (Beroun)
- Býkov-Láryšov (Bruntál)
- Býkovice (Blansko)
- Bylany (Chrudim)
- Bynovec (Děčín)
- Bystrá nad Jizerou (Semily)
- Bystrá (Pelhřimov)
- Bystré (Rychnov nad Kněžnou)
- Bystré (town; Svitavy)
- Bystročice (Olomouc)
- Bystrovany (Olomouc)
- Bystřany (Teplice)
- Bystřec (Ústí nad Orlicí)
- Bystřice (town; Benešov)
- Bystřice (Frýdek-Místek)
- Bystřice (Jičín)
- Bystřice nad Pernštejnem (town; Žďár nad Sázavou)
- Bystřice pod Hostýnem (town; Kroměříž)
- Bystřice pod Lopeníkem (Uherské Hradiště)
- Bystřička (Vsetín)
- Byšice (Mělník)
- Býškovice (Přerov)
- Býšovec (Žďár nad Sázavou)
- Býšť (Pardubice)
- Byzhradec (Rychnov nad Kněžnou)
- Bzenec (town; Hodonín)
- Bzová (Beroun)
- Bžany (Teplice)

== C ==
- Čachotín (Havlíčkův Brod)
- Čachovice (Mladá Boleslav)
- Čachrov (market town; Klatovy)
- Čakov (Benešov)
- Čakov (České Budějovice)
- Čaková (Bruntál)
- Čakovičky (Prague-East)
- Čankovice (Chrudim)
- Čáslav (town; Kutná Hora)
- Čáslavice (Třebíč)
- Čáslavsko (Pelhřimov)
- Částkov (Tachov)
- Částkov (Uherské Hradiště)
- Častohostice (Třebíč)
- Častolovice (market town; Rychnov nad Kněžnou)
- Častrov (Pelhřimov)
- Časy (Pardubice)
- Čavisov (Ostrava-City)
- Čebín (Brno-Country)
- Cebiv (Tachov)
- Čečelice (Mělník)
- Čečelovice (Strakonice)
- Čechočovice (Třebíč)
- Čechtice (market town; Benešov)
- Čechtín (Třebíč)
- Čechy pod Kosířem (Prostějov)
- Čechy (Přerov)
- Čečkovice (Havlíčkův Brod)
- Čečovice (Plzeň-South)
- Cehnice (Strakonice)
- Čehovice (Prostějov)
- Čejč (Hodonín)
- Čejetice (Strakonice)
- Čejkovice (České Budějovice)
- Čejkovice (Hodonín)
- Čejkovice (Kutná Hora)
- Čejkovice (Znojmo)
- Cejle (Jihlava)
- Čejov (Pelhřimov)
- Cekov (Rokycany)
- Čeladná (Frýdek-Místek)
- Čelákovice (town; Prague-East)
- Čelčice (Prostějov)
- Čelechovice na Hané (Prostějov)
- Čelechovice (Přerov)
- Čelistná (Pelhřimov)
- Čeložnice (Hodonín)
- Čeminy (Plzeň-North)
- Čenkov u Bechyně (Tábor)
- Čenkov (Příbram)
- Čenkovice (Ústí nad Orlicí)
- Cep (Jindřichův Hradec)
- Čeperka (Pardubice)
- Čepí (Pardubice)
- Čepřovice (Strakonice)
- Čeradice (Louny)
- Čerčany (Benešov)
- Cerekvice nad Bystřicí (Jičín)
- Cerekvice nad Loučnou (Svitavy)
- Cerekvička-Rosice (Jihlava)
- Cerhenice (market town; Kolín)
- Cerhonice (Písek)
- Cerhovice (market town; Beroun)
- Čermákovice (Znojmo)
- Čermná (Domažlice)
- Čermná (Trutnov)
- Čermná nad Orlicí (Rychnov nad Kněžnou)
- Čermná ve Slezsku (Opava)
- Černá Hora (market town; Blansko)
- Černá u Bohdanče (Pardubice)
- Černá v Pošumaví (Český Krumlov)
- Černá Voda (Jeseník)
- Černá (Žďár nad Sázavou)
- Černava (Karlovy Vary)
- Černčice (Louny)
- Černčice (Náchod)
- Černé Voděrady (Kolín)
- Černěves (Litoměřice)
- Černíč (Jihlava)
- Černíkov (Domažlice)
- Černíkovice (Plzeň-North)
- Černíkovice (Rychnov nad Kněžnou)
- Černíky (Kolín)
- Černilov (Hradec Králové)
- Černín (Znojmo)
- Černíny (Kutná Hora)
- Černiv (Litoměřice)
- Černolice (Prague-West)
- Černošice (town; Prague-West)
- Černošín (town; Tachov)
- Černotín (Přerov)
- Černouček (Litoměřice)
- Černousy (Liberec)
- Černov (Pelhřimov)
- Černovice (Blansko)
- Černovice (Chomutov)
- Černovice (town; Pelhřimov)
- Černovice (Plzeň-South)
- Čerňovice (Plzeň-North)
- Černožice (Hradec Králové)
- Černuc (Kladno)
- Černvír (Brno-Country)
- Černý Důl (market town; Trutnov)
- Černýšovice (Tábor)
- Červená Hora (Náchod)
- Červená Lhota (Třebíč)
- Červená Řečice (town; Pelhřimov)
- Červená Třemešná (Jičín)
- Červená Voda (Ústí nad Orlicí)
- Červené Janovice (Kutná Hora)
- Červené Pečky (market town; Kolín)
- Červené Poříčí (Klatovy)
- Červenka (Olomouc)
- Červený Hrádek (Jindřichův Hradec)
- Červený Kostelec (town; Náchod)
- Červený Újezd (Benešov)
- Červený Újezd (Prague-West)
- Česká Bělá (market town; Havlíčkův Brod)
- Česká Bříza (Plzeň-North)
- Česká Čermná (Náchod)
- Česká Kamenice (town; Děčín)
- Česká Kubice (Domažlice)
- Česká Lípa (town; Česká Lípa)
- Česká Metuje (Náchod)
- Česká Rybná (Ústí nad Orlicí)
- Česká Skalice (town; Náchod)
- Česká Třebová (town; Ústí nad Orlicí)
- Česká Ves (Jeseník)
- Česká (Brno-Country)
- České Budějovice (city; České Budějovice)
- České Heřmanice (market town; Ústí nad Orlicí)
- České Lhotice (Chrudim)
- České Libchavy (Ústí nad Orlicí)
- České Meziříčí (Rychnov nad Kněžnou)
- České Petrovice (Ústí nad Orlicí)
- České Velenice (town; Jindřichův Hradec)
- Český Brod (town; Kolín)
- Český Dub (town; Liberec)
- Český Jiřetín (Most)
- Český Krumlov (town; Český Krumlov)
- Český Rudolec (Jindřichův Hradec)
- Český Šternberk (market town; Benešov)
- Český Těšín (town; Karviná)
- Češov (Jičín)
- Čestice (Rychnov nad Kněžnou)
- Čestice (market town; Strakonice)
- Čestín (Kutná Hora)
- Čestlice (Prague-East)
- Cetechovice (Kroměříž)
- Cetenov (Liberec)
- Cetkovice (Blansko)
- Cetoraz (Pelhřimov)
- Cetyně (Příbram)
- Chabařovice (town; Ústí nad Labem)
- Chabeřice (Kutná Hora)
- Chaloupky (Beroun)
- Chanovice (Klatovy)
- Charvatce (Mladá Boleslav)
- Charváty (Olomouc)
- Chářovice (Benešov)
- Chbany (Chomutov)
- Cheb (town; Cheb)
- Chelčice (Strakonice)
- Cheznovice (Rokycany)
- Chlebičov (Opava)
- Chleby (Benešov)
- Chleby (Nymburk)
- Chleny (Rychnov nad Kněžnou)
- Chlístov (Benešov)
- Chlístov (Rychnov nad Kněžnou)
- Chlístov (Třebíč)
- Chlistov (Klatovy)
- Chlístovice (Kutná Hora)
- Chlum-Korouhvice (Žďár nad Sázavou)
- Chlum (Benešov)
- Chlum (Česká Lípa)
- Chlum (Plzeň-South)
- Chlum (Rokycany)
- Chlum (Strakonice)
- Chlum (Třebíč)
- Chlum Svaté Maří (Sokolov)
- Chlum u Třeboně (market town; Jindřichův Hradec)
- Chlumany (Prachatice)
- Chlumčany (Louny)
- Chlumčany (Plzeň-South)
- Chlumec (Český Krumlov)
- Chlumec (town; Ústí nad Labem)
- Chlumec nad Cidlinou (town; Hradec Králové)
- Chlumek (Žďár nad Sázavou)
- Chlumětín (Žďár nad Sázavou)
- Chlumín (Mělník)
- Chlumy (Plzeň-South)
- Chlustina (Beroun)
- Chmelík (Svitavy)
- Chmelná (Benešov)
- Chobot (Strakonice)
- Choceň (town; Ústí nad Orlicí)
- Chocenice (Plzeň-South)
- Chocerady (Benešov)
- Chocnějovice (Mladá Boleslav)
- Chocomyšl (Domažlice)
- Chodouň (Beroun)
- Chodouny (Litoměřice)
- Chodov (Domažlice)
- Chodov (Karlovy Vary)
- Chodov (town; Sokolov)
- Chodová Planá (market town; Tachov)
- Chodovlice (Litoměřice)
- Chodská Lhota (Domažlice)
- Chodský Újezd (Tachov)
- Cholenice (Jičín)
- Cholina (Olomouc)
- Choltice (market town; Pardubice)
- Chomle (Rokycany)
- Chomutice (Jičín)
- Chomutov (city; Chomutov)
- Chomýž (Kroměříž)
- Choratice (Benešov)
- Chornice (Svitavy)
- Chorušice (Mělník)
- Choryně (Vsetín)
- Choťánky (Nymburk)
- Chotěboř (town; Havlíčkův Brod)
- Chotěbudice (Třebíč)
- Chotěbuz (Karviná)
- Choteč (Jičín)
- Choteč (Pardubice)
- Choteč (Prague-West)
- Chotěmice (Tábor)
- Chotěnov (Svitavy)
- Chotěšice (Nymburk)
- Chotěšov (Litoměřice)
- Chotěšov (Plzeň-South)
- Chotětov (market town; Mladá Boleslav)
- Chotěvice (Trutnov)
- Chotíkov (Plzeň-North)
- Chotilsko (Příbram)
- Chotiměř (Litoměřice)
- Chotiněves (Litoměřice)
- Chotovice (Česká Lípa)
- Chotovice (Svitavy)
- Choťovice (Nymburk)
- Chotoviny (Tábor)
- Chotusice (Kutná Hora)
- Chotutice (Kolín)
- Chotýčany (České Budějovice)
- Chotyně (Liberec)
- Chotýšany (Benešov)
- Choustník (Tábor)
- Choustníkovo Hradiště (market town; Trutnov)
- Chožov (Louny)
- Chraberce (Louny)
- Chrast (town; Chrudim)
- Chrást (Nymburk)
- Chrást (Plzeň-City)
- Chrást (Příbram)
- Chrastava (town; Liberec)
- Chrastavec (Svitavy)
- Chrastavice (Domažlice)
- Chrášťany (Benešov)
- Chrášťany (České Budějovice)
- Chrášťany (Kolín)
- Chrášťany (Prague-West)
- Chrášťany (Rakovník)
- Chraštice (Příbram)
- Chrášťovice (Strakonice)
- Chrbonín (Tábor)
- Chřenovice (Havlíčkův Brod)
- Chřibská (town; Děčín)
- Chříč (Plzeň-North)
- Chroboly (Prachatice)
- Chromeč (Šumperk)
- Chropyně (town; Kroměříž)
- Chroustov (Nymburk)
- Chroustovice (market town; Chrudim)
- Chrtníč (Havlíčkův Brod)
- Chrtníky (Pardubice)
- Chrudichromy (Blansko)
- Chrudim (town; Chrudim)
- Chrustenice (Beroun)
- Chržín (Kladno)
- Chudčice (Brno-Country)
- Chudenice (market town; Klatovy)
- Chudenín (Klatovy)
- Chuderov (Ústí nad Labem)
- Chudeřice (Hradec Králové)
- Chudíř (Mladá Boleslav)
- Chudoslavice (Litoměřice)
- Chuchelná (Opava)
- Chuchelna (Semily)
- Chvalatice (Znojmo)
- Chvalčov (Kroměříž)
- Chvaleč (Trutnov)
- Chválenice (Plzeň-City)
- Chvaletice (town; Pardubice)
- Chvalíkovice (Opava)
- Chvalkovice (Náchod)
- Chvalkovice (Vyškov)
- Chvalnov-Lísky (Kroměříž)
- Chvalovice (Prachatice)
- Chvalovice (Znojmo)
- Chvalšiny (Český Krumlov)
- Chvatěruby (Mělník)
- Chvojenec (Pardubice)
- Chyjice (Jičín)
- Chyňava (Beroun)
- Chýně (town; Prague-West)
- Chýnice (Prague-West)
- Chýnov (town; Tábor)
- Chýstovice (Pelhřimov)
- Chyše (town; Karlovy Vary)
- Chyšky (Písek)
- Chyšná (Pelhřimov)
- Chýšť (Pardubice)
- Číčenice (Strakonice)
- Čichalov (Karlovy Vary)
- Číchov (Třebíč)
- Číčovice (Prague-West)
- Cidlina (Třebíč)
- Číhalín (Třebíč)
- Číhaň (Klatovy)
- Číhošť (Havlíčkův Brod)
- Cikháj (Žďár nad Sázavou)
- Čikov (Třebíč)
- Čilá (Rokycany)
- Čilec (Nymburk)
- Čím (Příbram)
- Čimelice (Písek)
- Číměř (Jindřichův Hradec)
- Číměř (Třebíč)
- Čímice (Klatovy)
- Činěves (Nymburk)
- Církvice (Kolín)
- Církvice (Kutná Hora)
- Císařov (Přerov)
- Čisovice (Prague-West)
- Čistá (Mladá Boleslav)
- Čistá (market town; Rakovník)
- Čistá (Svitavy)
- Čistá u Horek (Semily)
- Čistěves (Hradec Králové)
- Citice (Sokolov)
- Cítoliby (market town; Louny)
- Citonice (Znojmo)
- Cítov (Mělník)
- Citov (Přerov)
- Čižice (Plzeň-South)
- Čížkov (Pelhřimov)
- Čížkov (Plzeň-South)
- Čížkovice (Litoměřice)
- Čížkrajice (České Budějovice)
- Cizkrajov (Jindřichův Hradec)
- Čížov (Jihlava)
- Čížová (Písek)
- Čkyně (Prachatice)
- Člunek (Jindřichův Hradec)
- Čmelíny (Plzeň-South)
- Cotkytle (Ústí nad Orlicí)
- Crhov (Blansko)
- Ctětín (Chrudim)
- Ctiboř (Benešov)
- Ctiboř (Tachov)
- Ctidružice (Znojmo)
- Ctiměřice (Mladá Boleslav)
- Ctiněves (Litoměřice)
- Čtveřín (Liberec)
- Čtyřkoly (Benešov)
- Čučice (Brno-Country)
- Cvikov (town; Česká Lípa)
- Cvrčovice (Brno-Country)
- Cvrčovice (Kladno)

== D ==
- Dačice (town; Jindřichův Hradec)
- Dalečín (Žďár nad Sázavou)
- Daleké Dušníky (Příbram)
- Dalešice (Jablonec nad Nisou)
- Dalešice (market town; Třebíč)
- Dalovice (Karlovy Vary)
- Dalovice (Mladá Boleslav)
- Dambořice (Hodonín)
- Damnice (Znojmo)
- Damníkov (Ústí nad Orlicí)
- Daňkovice (Žďár nad Sázavou)
- Darkovice (Opava)
- Daskabát (Olomouc)
- Dasnice (Sokolov)
- Dasný (České Budějovice)
- Dašice (town; Pardubice)
- Davle (market town; Prague-West)
- Deblín (market town; Brno-Country)
- Děčany (Litoměřice)
- Děčín (city; Děčín)
- Dědice (Třebíč)
- Dědová (Chrudim)
- Dehtáře (Pelhřimov)
- Děhylov (Opava)
- Děkanovice (Benešov)
- Děkov (Rakovník)
- Děpoltovice (Karlovy Vary)
- Dešenice (market town; Klatovy)
- Desná (town; Jablonec nad Nisou)
- Dešná (Jindřichův Hradec)
- Desná (Svitavy)
- Dešná (Zlín)
- Dešov (Třebíč)
- Deštná (Blansko)
- Deštná (town; Jindřichův Hradec)
- Deštné v Orlických horách (Rychnov nad Kněžnou)
- Deštnice (Louny)
- Dětenice (Jičín)
- Dětkovice (Prostějov)
- Dětkovice (Vyškov)
- Dětmarovice (Karviná)
- Dětřichov (Liberec)
- Dětřichov (Svitavy)
- Dětřichov nad Bystřicí (Bruntál)
- Dětřichov u Moravské Třebové (Svitavy)
- Dílce (Jičín)
- Díly (Domažlice)
- Dírná (Tábor)
- Diváky (Břeclav)
- Dívčí Hrad (Bruntál)
- Dívčí Kopy (Jindřichův Hradec)
- Dívčice (České Budějovice)
- Divec (Hradec Králové)
- Divišov (market town; Benešov)
- Dlažkovice (Litoměřice)
- Dlažov (Klatovy)
- Dlouhá Brtnice (Jihlava)
- Dlouhá Lhota (Blansko)
- Dlouhá Lhota (Mladá Boleslav)
- Dlouhá Lhota (Příbram)
- Dlouhá Lhota (Tábor)
- Dlouhá Loučka (Olomouc)
- Dlouhá Loučka (Svitavy)
- Dlouhá Stráň (Bruntál)
- Dlouhá Třebová (Ústí nad Orlicí)
- Dlouhá Ves (Havlíčkův Brod)
- Dlouhá Ves (Klatovy)
- Dlouhé (Žďár nad Sázavou)
- Dlouhomilov (Šumperk)
- Dlouhoňovice (Ústí nad Orlicí)
- Dlouhopolsko (Nymburk)
- Dlouhý Most (Liberec)
- Dlouhý Újezd (Tachov)
- Dnešice (Plzeň-South)
- Dobelice (Znojmo)
- Dobev (Písek)
- Dobkovice (Děčín)
- Dobrá Voda (Pelhřimov)
- Dobrá Voda (Žďár nad Sázavou)
- Dobrá Voda u Českých Budějovic (České Budějovice)
- Dobrá Voda u Hořic (Jičín)
- Dobrá Voda u Pacova (Pelhřimov)
- Dobrá (Frýdek-Místek)
- Dobřany (town; Plzeň-South)
- Dobřany (Rychnov nad Kněžnou)
- Dobratice (Frýdek-Místek)
- Dobrčice (Přerov)
- Dobré Pole (Břeclav)
- Dobré (Rychnov nad Kněžnou)
- Dobřejovice (Prague-East)
- Dobřeň (Mělník)
- Dobřenice (Hradec Králové)
- Dobříč (Plzeň-North)
- Dobříč (Prague-West)
- Dobřichov (Kolín)
- Dobřichovice (town; Prague-West)
- Dobříkov (Ústí nad Orlicí)
- Dobříň (Litoměřice)
- Dobřínsko (Znojmo)
- Dobříš (town; Příbram)
- Dobřív (Rokycany)
- Dobrkovice (Zlín)
- Dobrná (Děčín)
- Dobročkovice (Vyškov)
- Dobročovice (Prague-East)
- Dobrohošť (Jindřichův Hradec)
- Dobrochov (Prostějov)
- Dobroměřice (Louny)
- Dobromilice (Prostějov)
- Dobronice u Bechyně (Tábor)
- Dobronín (Jihlava)
- Dobroslavice (Opava)
- Dobroutov (Jihlava)
- Dobrovice (town; Mladá Boleslav)
- Dobrovítov (Kutná Hora)
- Dobrovíz (Prague-West)
- Dobršín (Klatovy)
- Dobruška (town; Rychnov nad Kněžnou)
- Dobšice (České Budějovice)
- Dobšice (Nymburk)
- Dobšice (Znojmo)
- Dobšín (Mladá Boleslav)
- Dohalice (Hradec Králové)
- Doksany (Litoměřice)
- Doksy (town; Česká Lípa)
- Doksy (Kladno)
- Dolánky nad Ohří (Litoměřice)
- Dolany (Kladno)
- Dolany (Klatovy)
- Dolany (Náchod)
- Dolany (Olomouc)
- Dolany (Pardubice)
- Dolany (Plzeň-North)
- Dolany nad Vltavou (Prague-West)
- Dolce (Plzeň-South)
- Dolenice (Znojmo)
- Dolní Bečva (Vsetín)
- Dolní Bělá (Plzeň-North)
- Dolní Benešov (town; Opava)
- Dolní Beřkovice (Mělník)
- Dolní Bezděkov (Chrudim)
- Dolní Bojanovice (Hodonín)
- Dolní Bousov (town; Mladá Boleslav)
- Dolní Branná (Trutnov)
- Dolní Břežany (Prague-West)
- Dolní Brusnice (Trutnov)
- Dolní Bukovsko (market town; České Budějovice)
- Dolní Cerekev (market town; Jihlava)
- Dolní Čermná (market town; Ústí nad Orlicí)
- Dolní Chvatliny (Kolín)
- Dolní Dobrouč (Ústí nad Orlicí)
- Dolní Domaslavice (Frýdek-Místek)
- Dolní Dubňany (Znojmo)
- Dolní Dunajovice (Břeclav)
- Dolní Dvořiště (Český Krumlov)
- Dolní Dvůr (Trutnov)
- Dolní Habartice (Děčín)
- Dolní Hbity (Příbram)
- Dolní Heřmanice (Žďár nad Sázavou)
- Dolní Hořice (Tábor)
- Dolní Hradiště (Plzeň-North)
- Dolní Hrachovice (Tábor)
- Dolní Kalná (Trutnov)
- Dolní Kounice (town; Brno-Country)
- Dolní Kralovice (Benešov)
- Dolní Krupá (Havlíčkův Brod)
- Dolní Krupá (Mladá Boleslav)
- Dolní Lánov (Trutnov)
- Dolní Lažany (Třebíč)
- Dolní Lhota (Ostrava-City)
- Dolní Lhota (Zlín)
- Dolní Libochová (Žďár nad Sázavou)
- Dolní Lochov (Jičín)
- Dolní Lomná (Frýdek-Místek)
- Dolní Loučky (Brno-Country)
- Dolní Lukavice (Plzeň-South)
- Dolní Lutyně (Karviná)
- Dolní Město (Havlíčkův Brod)
- Dolní Morava (Ústí nad Orlicí)
- Dolní Moravice (Bruntál)
- Dolní Němčí (Uherské Hradiště)
- Dolní Nětčice (Přerov)
- Dolní Nivy (Sokolov)
- Dolní Novosedly (Písek)
- Dolní Olešnice (Trutnov)
- Dolní Pěna (Jindřichův Hradec)
- Dolní Podluží (Děčín)
- Dolní Pohleď (Kutná Hora)
- Dolní Poustevna (town; Děčín)
- Dolní Přím (Hradec Králové)
- Dolní Radechová (Náchod)
- Dolní Řasnice (Liberec)
- Dolní Ředice (Pardubice)
- Dolní Roveň (Pardubice)
- Dolní Rožínka (Žďár nad Sázavou)
- Dolní Rychnov (Sokolov)
- Dolní Slivno (Mladá Boleslav)
- Dolní Sokolovec (Havlíčkův Brod)
- Dolní Stakory (Mladá Boleslav)
- Dolní Studénky (Šumperk)
- Dolní Těšice (Přerov)
- Dolní Tošanovice (Frýdek-Místek)
- Dolní Třebonín (Český Krumlov)
- Dolní Újezd (Přerov)
- Dolní Újezd (Svitavy)
- Dolní Věstonice (Břeclav)
- Dolní Vilémovice (Třebíč)
- Dolní Vilímeč (Jihlava)
- Dolní Zálezly (Ústí nad Labem)
- Dolní Žandov (Cheb)
- Dolní Žďár (Jindřichův Hradec)
- Dolní Zimoř (Mělník)
- Dolní Životice (Opava)
- Doloplazy (Olomouc)
- Doloplazy (Prostějov)
- Domamil (Třebíč)
- Domanín (Hodonín)
- Domanín (Jindřichův Hradec)
- Dománovice (Kolín)
- Domašín (Chomutov)
- Domašov nad Bystřicí (Olomouc)
- Domašov u Šternberka (Olomouc)
- Domašov (Brno-Country)
- Domaželice (Přerov)
- Domažlice (town; Domažlice)
- Domoraz (Klatovy)
- Domousnice (Mladá Boleslav)
- Domoušice (Louny)
- Doňov (Jindřichův Hradec)
- Doubek (Prague-East)
- Doubice (Děčín)
- Doubrava (Karviná)
- Doubravčice (Kolín)
- Doubravice (České Budějovice)
- Doubravice (Strakonice)
- Doubravice (Trutnov)
- Doubravice nad Svitavou (market town; Blansko)
- Doubravička (Mladá Boleslav)
- Doubravník (market town; Brno-Country)
- Doubravy (Zlín)
- Doudleby nad Orlicí (market town; Rychnov nad Kněžnou)
- Doudleby (České Budějovice)
- Doupě (Jihlava)
- Drachkov (Strakonice)
- Dráchov (Tábor)
- Drahanovice (Olomouc)
- Drahany (market town; Prostějov)
- Drahelčice (Prague-West)
- Drahenice (Příbram)
- Drahkov (Plzeň-South)
- Drahlín (Příbram)
- Drahňovice (Benešov)
- Drahobudice (Kolín)
- Drahobuz (Litoměřice)
- Drahonice (Strakonice)
- Drahonín (Brno-Country)
- Drahoňův Újezd (Rokycany)
- Drahotěšice (České Budějovice)
- Drahotín (Domažlice)
- Drahouš (Rakovník)
- Drahov (Tábor)
- Drásov (market town; Brno-Country)
- Drásov (Příbram)
- Dražeň (Plzeň-North)
- Draženov (Domažlice)
- Dražice (Tábor)
- Dražíč (Písek)
- Dražičky (Tábor)
- Drážov (Strakonice)
- Dražovice (Klatovy)
- Dražovice (Vyškov)
- Dražůvky (Hodonín)
- Dřenice (Chrudim)
- Dřešín (Strakonice)
- Dřetovice (Kladno)
- Dřevčice (Prague-East)
- Dřevěnice (Jičín)
- Drevníky (Příbram)
- Dřevnovice (Prostějov)
- Dřevohostice (market town; Přerov)
- Drhovice (Tábor)
- Drhovle (Písek)
- Drhovy (Příbram)
- Dřínov (Kladno)
- Dřínov (Kroměříž)
- Dřínov (Mělník)
- Dřísy (Mělník)
- Dříteč (Pardubice)
- Dříteň (České Budějovice)
- Drmoul (Cheb)
- Drnek (Kladno)
- Drnholec (market town; Břeclav)
- Drnovice (Blansko)
- Drnovice (Vyškov)
- Drnovice (Zlín)
- Drobovice (Kutná Hora)
- Droužetice (Strakonice)
- Droužkovice (Chomutov)
- Drozdov (Beroun)
- Drozdov (Šumperk)
- Drslavice (Prachatice)
- Drslavice (Uherské Hradiště)
- Druhanov (Havlíčkův Brod)
- Drunče (Jindřichův Hradec)
- Druztová (Plzeň-North)
- Družec (Kladno)
- Drysice (Vyškov)
- Držkov (Jablonec nad Nisou)
- Držková (Zlín)
- Dub (market town; Prachatice)
- Dub nad Moravou (market town; Olomouc)
- Dubá (town; Česká Lípa)
- Dubany (Pardubice)
- Dubčany (Olomouc)
- Dubenec (Příbram)
- Dubenec (Trutnov)
- Dubí (town; Teplice)
- Dubicko (Šumperk)
- Dubičné (České Budějovice)
- Dublovice (Příbram)
- Dubňany (town; Hodonín)
- Dubné (České Budějovice)
- Dubnice (Česká Lípa)
- Dubno (Příbram)
- Dubovice (Pelhřimov)
- Duchcov (town; Teplice)
- Dudín (Jihlava)
- Dukovany (Třebíč)
- Důl (Pelhřimov)
- Dunajovice (Jindřichův Hradec)
- Dunice (Benešov)
- Dušejov (Jihlava)
- Dušníky (Litoměřice)
- Dvakačovice (Chrudim)
- Dvorce (Bruntál)
- Dvorce (Jihlava)
- Dvory (Nymburk)
- Dvory (Prachatice)
- Dvory nad Lužnicí (Jindřichův Hradec)
- Dvůr Králové nad Labem (town; Trutnov)
- Dyjákovice (Znojmo)
- Dyjákovičky (Znojmo)
- Dyje (Znojmo)
- Dyjice (Jihlava)
- Dymokury (Nymburk)
- Dynín (České Budějovice)
- Dýšina (Plzeň-City)
- Džbánice (Znojmo)
- Džbánov (Ústí nad Orlicí)
- Dzbel (Prostějov)

== E ==
- Ejpovice (Rokycany)
- Erpužice (Tachov)
- Eš (Pelhřimov)
- Evaň (Litoměřice)

== F ==
- Felbabka (Beroun)
- Frahelž (Jindřichův Hradec)
- Francova Lhota (Vsetín)
- Františkov nad Ploučnicí (Děčín)
- Františkovy Lázně (town; Cheb)
- Frenštát pod Radhoštěm (town; Nový Jičín)
- Fryčovice (Frýdek-Místek)
- Frýdek-Místek (city; Frýdek-Místek)
- Frýdlant (town; Liberec)
- Frýdlant nad Ostravicí (town; Frýdek-Místek)
- Frýdštejn (Jablonec nad Nisou)
- Frymburk (market town; Český Krumlov)
- Frymburk (Klatovy)
- Fryšava pod Žákovou horou (Žďár nad Sázavou)
- Fryšták (town; Zlín)
- Fulnek (town; Nový Jičín)

== G ==
- Golčův Jeníkov (town; Havlíčkův Brod)
- Grešlové Mýto (Znojmo)
- Gruna (Svitavy)
- Grunta (Kolín)
- Grygov (Olomouc)
- Grymov (Přerov)

== H ==
- Habartice (Liberec)
- Habartov (town; Sokolov)
- Habrovany (Ústí nad Labem)
- Habrovany (Vyškov)
- Habrůvka (Blansko)
- Habry (town; Havlíčkův Brod)
- Habří (České Budějovice)
- Habřina (Hradec Králové)
- Hačky (Prostějov)
- Hadravova Rosička (Jindřichův Hradec)
- Háj u Duchcova (Teplice)
- Háj ve Slezsku (Opava)
- Hajany (Brno-Country)
- Hajany (Strakonice)
- Háje nad Jizerou (Semily)
- Háje (Příbram)
- Hájek (Karlovy Vary)
- Hájek (Strakonice)
- Hajnice (Trutnov)
- Halámky (Jindřichův Hradec)
- Halenkov (Vsetín)
- Halenkovice (Zlín)
- Haluzice (Zlín)
- Halže (Tachov)
- Hamr (Jindřichův Hradec)
- Hamr na Jezeře (Česká Lípa)
- Hamry (Chrudim)
- Hamry (Klatovy)
- Hamry nad Sázavou (Žďár nad Sázavou)
- Haňovice (Olomouc)
- Hanušovice (town; Šumperk)
- Harrachov (town; Jablonec nad Nisou)
- Hartinkov (Svitavy)
- Hartmanice (České Budějovice)
- Hartmanice (town; Klatovy)
- Hartmanice (Svitavy)
- Hartvíkovice (Třebíč)
- Haškovcova Lhota (Tábor)
- Hať (Opava)
- Hatín (Jindřichův Hradec)
- Havířov (city; Karviná)
- Havlíčkova Borová (market town; Havlíčkův Brod)
- Havlíčkův Brod (town; Havlíčkův Brod)
- Havlovice (Trutnov)
- Havraň (Most)
- Havraníky (Znojmo)
- Hazlov (Cheb)
- Hejná (Klatovy)
- Hejnice (town; Liberec)
- Hejnice (Ústí nad Orlicí)
- Hejtmánkovice (Náchod)
- Helvíkovice (Ústí nad Orlicí)
- Herálec (Havlíčkův Brod)
- Herálec (Žďár nad Sázavou)
- Heraltice (market town; Třebíč)
- Herink (Prague-East)
- Heroltice (Brno-Country)
- Heršpice (Vyškov)
- Heřmaň (České Budějovice)
- Heřmaň (Písek)
- Heřmaneč (Jindřichův Hradec)
- Heřmanice (Havlíčkův Brod)
- Heřmanice (Liberec)
- Heřmanice (Náchod)
- Heřmanice u Oder (Nový Jičín)
- Heřmaničky (Benešov)
- Heřmánkovice (Náchod)
- Heřmánky (Nový Jičín)
- Heřmanov (Děčín)
- Heřmanov (Žďár nad Sázavou)
- Heřmanova Huť (Plzeň-North)
- Heřmanovice (Bruntál)
- Heřmanův Městec (town; Chrudim)
- Hevlín (Znojmo)
- Hladké Životice (Nový Jičín)
- Hladov (Jihlava)
- Hlasivo (Tábor)
- Hlásná Třebaň (Beroun)
- Hlásnice (Olomouc)
- Hlavatce (České Budějovice)
- Hlavatce (Tábor)
- Hlavečník (Pardubice)
- Hlavenec (Mladá Boleslav)
- Hlavice (Liberec)
- Hlavnice (Opava)
- Hlavňovice (Klatovy)
- Hlína (Brno-Country)
- Hlince (Plzeň-North)
- Hlincová Hora (České Budějovice)
- Hlinka (Bruntál)
- Hlinná (Litoměřice)
- Hlinsko (town; Chrudim)
- Hlinsko (Přerov)
- Hlízov (Kutná Hora)
- Hlohová (Domažlice)
- Hlohovčice (Domažlice)
- Hlohovec (Břeclav)
- Hlohovice (Rokycany)
- Hlubočany (Vyškov)
- Hlubočec (Opava)
- Hlubočky (Olomouc)
- Hluboká (Chrudim)
- Hluboká nad Vltavou (town; České Budějovice)
- Hluboké Dvory (Brno-Country)
- Hluboké Mašůvky (Znojmo)
- Hluboké (Třebíč)
- Hluboš (Příbram)
- Hlubyně (Příbram)
- Hluchov (Prostějov)
- Hlučín (town; Opava)
- Hluk (town; Uherské Hradiště)
- Hlupín (Strakonice)
- Hlušice (Hradec Králové)
- Hlušovice (Olomouc)
- Hnačov (Klatovy)
- Hnanice (Znojmo)
- Hnátnice (Ústí nad Orlicí)
- Hněvčeves (Hradec Králové)
- Hněvkovice (Havlíčkův Brod)
- Hněvnice (Plzeň-North)
- Hněvošice (Opava)
- Hněvotín (Olomouc)
- Hnojice (Olomouc)
- Hnojník (Frýdek-Místek)
- Hobšovice (Kladno)
- Hodějice (Vyškov)
- Hodětín (Tábor)
- Hodice (Jihlava)
- Hodíškov (Žďár nad Sázavou)
- Hodkovice nad Mohelkou (town; Liberec)
- Hodonice (Tábor)
- Hodonice (Znojmo)
- Hodonín (Blansko)
- Hodonín (Chrudim)
- Hodonín (town; Hodonín)
- Hodov (Třebíč)
- Hodslavice (Nový Jičín)
- Hojanovice (Pelhřimov)
- Hojkov (Jihlava)
- Hojovice (Pelhřimov)
- Holany (market town; Česká Lípa)
- Holasice (Brno-Country)
- Holasovice (Opava)
- Holčovice (Bruntál)
- Holedeč (Louny)
- Holenice (Semily)
- Holešov (town; Kroměříž)
- Holetín (Chrudim)
- Holice (town; Pardubice)
- Holín (Jičín)
- Holohlavy (Hradec Králové)
- Holotín (Pardubice)
- Holoubkov (Rokycany)
- Holovousy (Jičín)
- Holovousy (Plzeň-North)
- Holštejn (Blansko)
- Holubice (Prague-West)
- Holubice (Vyškov)
- Holubov (Český Krumlov)
- Holýšov (town; Plzeň-South)
- Homole (České Budějovice)
- Homole u Panny (Ústí nad Labem)
- Honbice (Chrudim)
- Honětice (Kroměříž)
- Honezovice (Plzeň-South)
- Hora Svaté Kateřiny (town; Most)
- Hora Svatého Šebestiána (Chomutov)
- Hora Svatého Václava (Domažlice)
- Hořany (Nymburk)
- Hořátev (Nymburk)
- Horažďovice (town; Klatovy)
- Horčápsko (Příbram)
- Hořenice (Náchod)
- Hořepník (Pelhřimov)
- Hořesedly (Rakovník)
- Hořešovice (Kladno)
- Hořešovičky (Kladno)
- Hořice (town; Jičín)
- Hořice (Pelhřimov)
- Hořice na Šumavě (market town; Český Krumlov)
- Hořičky (Náchod)
- Hořín (Mělník)
- Hořiněves (Hradec Králové)
- Horka I (Kutná Hora)
- Horka II (Kutná Hora)
- Horka nad Moravou (Olomouc)
- Horka u Staré Paky (Semily)
- Horka (Chrudim)
- Horky (Kutná Hora)
- Horky (Svitavy)
- Horky nad Jizerou (Mladá Boleslav)
- Horní Bečva (Vsetín)
- Horní Bělá (Plzeň-North)
- Horní Benešov (town; Bruntál)
- Horní Beřkovice (Litoměřice)
- Horní Bezděkov (Kladno)
- Horní Blatná (town; Karlovy Vary)
- Horní Bludovice (Frýdek-Místek)
- Horní Bojanovice (Břeclav)
- Horní Bradlo (Chrudim)
- Horní Branná (Semily)
- Horní Břečkov (Znojmo)
- Horní Bříza (town; Plzeň-North)
- Horní Brusnice (Trutnov)
- Horní Bukovina (Mladá Boleslav)
- Horní Cerekev (town; Pelhřimov)
- Horní Čermná (Ústí nad Orlicí)
- Horní Domaslavice (Frýdek-Místek)
- Horní Dubenky (Jihlava)
- Horní Dubňany (Znojmo)
- Horní Dunajovice (market town; Znojmo)
- Horní Dvořiště (Český Krumlov)
- Horní Habartice (Děčín)
- Horní Heřmanice (Třebíč)
- Horní Heřmanice (Ústí nad Orlicí)
- Horní Jelení (town; Pardubice)
- Horní Jiřetín (town; Most)
- Horní Kalná (Trutnov)
- Horní Kamenice (Plzeň-South)
- Horní Kněžeklady (České Budějovice)
- Horní Kounice (Znojmo)
- Horní Kozolupy (Tachov)
- Horní Krupá (Havlíčkův Brod)
- Horní Kruty (Kolín)
- Horní Lapač (Kroměříž)
- Horní Lhota (Ostrava-City)
- Horní Lhota (Zlín)
- Horní Libchava (Česká Lípa)
- Horní Libochová (Žďár nad Sázavou)
- Horní Lideč (Vsetín)
- Horní Loděnice (Olomouc)
- Horní Lomná (Frýdek-Místek)
- Horní Loučky (Brno-Country)
- Horní Lukavice (Plzeň-South)
- Horní Maršov (Trutnov)
- Horní Město (Bruntál)
- Horní Meziříčko (Jindřichův Hradec)
- Horní Moštěnice (Přerov)
- Horní Myslová (Jihlava)
- Horní Němčí (Uherské Hradiště)
- Horní Němčice (Jindřichův Hradec)
- Horní Nětčice (Přerov)
- Horní Olešnice (Trutnov)
- Horní Paseka (Havlíčkův Brod)
- Horní Pěna (Jindřichův Hradec)
- Horní Planá (town; Český Krumlov)
- Horní Počaply (Mělník)
- Horní Podluží (Děčín)
- Horní Police (Česká Lípa)
- Horní Poříčí (Blansko)
- Horní Poříčí (Strakonice)
- Horní Radechová (Náchod)
- Horní Radouň (Jindřichův Hradec)
- Horní Radslavice (Žďár nad Sázavou)
- Horní Rápotice (Pelhřimov)
- Horní Řasnice (Liberec)
- Horní Ředice (Pardubice)
- Horní Řepčice (Litoměřice)
- Horní Rožínka (Žďár nad Sázavou)
- Horní Skrýchov (Jindřichův Hradec)
- Horní Slatina (Jindřichův Hradec)
- Horní Slavkov (town; Sokolov)
- Horní Slivno (Mladá Boleslav)
- Horní Smrčné (Třebíč)
- Horní Smržov (Blansko)
- Horní Stropnice (České Budějovice)
- Horní Studénky (Šumperk)
- Horní Suchá (Karviná)
- Horní Štěpánov (Prostějov)
- Horní Těšice (Přerov)
- Horní Tošanovice (Frýdek-Místek)
- Horní Třešňovec (Ústí nad Orlicí)
- Horní Újezd (Přerov)
- Horní Újezd (Svitavy)
- Horní Újezd (Třebíč)
- Horní Ves (Pelhřimov)
- Horní Věstonice (Břeclav)
- Horní Vilémovice (Třebíč)
- Horní Vltavice (Prachatice)
- Horní Životice (Bruntál)
- Hornice (Třebíč)
- Hornosín (Strakonice)
- Horoměřice (Prague-West)
- Horosedly (Písek)
- Horoušany (Prague-East)
- Hořovice (town; Beroun)
- Hořovičky (Rakovník)
- Horská Kvilda (Klatovy)
- Horšice (Plzeň-South)
- Horšovský Týn (town; Domažlice)
- Horušice (Kutná Hora)
- Hory (Karlovy Vary)
- Hosín (České Budějovice)
- Hoslovice (Strakonice)
- Hospozín (Kladno)
- Hospříz (Jindřichův Hradec)
- Hošťálková (Vsetín)
- Hošťálkovy (Bruntál)
- Hošťalovice (Chrudim)
- Hostašovice (Nový Jičín)
- Hoštejn (Šumperk)
- Hostějov (Uherské Hradiště)
- Hostěnice (Brno-Country)
- Hostěradice (Znojmo)
- Hostěrádky-Rešov (Vyškov)
- Hostětice (Jihlava)
- Hostětín (Uherské Hradiště)
- Hoštice (Kroměříž)
- Hoštice (Strakonice)
- Hoštice-Heroltice (Vyškov)
- Hostim (Znojmo)
- Hostín u Vojkovic (Mělník)
- Hostín (Mělník)
- Hostinné (town; Trutnov)
- Hostišová (Zlín)
- Hostivice (town; Prague-West)
- Hoštka (town; Litoměřice)
- Hošťka (Tachov)
- Hostomice (town; Beroun)
- Hostomice (market town; Teplice)
- Hostouň (town; Domažlice)
- Hostouň (Kladno)
- Hostovlice (Kutná Hora)
- Hosty (České Budějovice)
- Hovězí (Vsetín)
- Hovorany (Hodonín)
- Hovorčovice (Prague-East)
- Hraběšice (Šumperk)
- Hraběšín (Kutná Hora)
- Hrabětice (Znojmo)
- Hrabišín (Šumperk)
- Hrabová (Šumperk)
- Hrabůvka (Přerov)
- Hrabyně (Opava)
- Hracholusky (Prachatice)
- Hracholusky (Rakovník)
- Hrachoviště (Jindřichův Hradec)
- Hradce (České Budějovice)
- Hradčany-Kobeřice (Prostějov)
- Hradčany (Brno-Country)
- Hradčany (Nymburk)
- Hradčany (Přerov)
- Hradčovice (Uherské Hradiště)
- Hradec (Havlíčkův Brod)
- Hradec (Plzeň-South)
- Hradec Králové (city; Hradec Králové)
- Hradec nad Moravicí (town; Opava)
- Hradec nad Svitavou (Svitavy)
- Hradec-Nová Ves (Jeseník)
- Hradečno (Kladno)
- Hrádek (Frýdek-Místek)
- Hrádek (Hradec Králové)
- Hrádek (Klatovy)
- Hrádek (town; Rokycany)
- Hrádek (Ústí nad Orlicí)
- Hrádek (Znojmo)
- Hrádek nad Nisou (town; Liberec)
- Hradešice (Klatovy)
- Hradešín (Kolín)
- Hradiště (Benešov)
- Hradiště (Domažlice)
- Hradiště (Plzeň-South)
- Hradiště (Rokycany)
- Hradištko (Nymburk)
- Hradištko (Prague-West)
- Hranice (České Budějovice)
- Hranice (town; Cheb)
- Hranice (town; Přerov)
- Hraničné Petrovice (Olomouc)
- Hrazany (Písek)
- Hrčava (Frýdek-Místek)
- Hrdějovice (České Budějovice)
- Hrdibořice (Prostějov)
- Hrdlív (Kladno)
- Hrdlořezy (Mladá Boleslav)
- Hřebeč (Kladno)
- Hřebečníky (Rakovník)
- Hředle (Beroun)
- Hředle (Rakovník)
- Hrejkovice (Písek)
- Hřensko (Děčín)
- Hřibiny-Ledská (Rychnov nad Kněžnou)
- Hřibojedy (Trutnov)
- Hřiměždice (Příbram)
- Hříšice (Jindřichův Hradec)
- Hříškov (Louny)
- Hřivice (Louny)
- Hřivínův Újezd (Zlín)
- Hrob (town; Teplice)
- Hrobce (Litoměřice)
- Hrobčice (Teplice)
- Hrobice (Pardubice)
- Hrobice (Zlín)
- Hrochův Týnec (town; Chrudim)
- Hromnice (Plzeň-North)
- Hronov (town; Náchod)
- Hrotovice (town; Třebíč)
- Hroubovice (Chrudim)
- Hroznatín (Třebíč)
- Hroznětín (town; Karlovy Vary)
- Hroznová Lhota (Hodonín)
- Hrubá Skála (Semily)
- Hrubá Vrbka (Hodonín)
- Hrubčice (Prostějov)
- Hrubý Jeseník (Nymburk)
- Hrusice (Prague-East)
- Hruška (Prostějov)
- Hrušky (Břeclav)
- Hrušky (Vyškov)
- Hrušov (Mladá Boleslav)
- Hrušová (Ústí nad Orlicí)
- Hrušovany nad Jevišovkou (town; Znojmo)
- Hrušovany u Brna (Brno-Country)
- Hrušovany (Chomutov)
- Hrutov (Třebíč)
- Hubenov (Jihlava)
- Hudčice (Příbram)
- Hudlice (Beroun)
- Hukvaldy (Frýdek-Místek)
- Hulice (Benešov)
- Hulín (town; Kroměříž)
- Humburky (Hradec Králové)
- Humpolec (town; Pelhřimov)
- Huntířov (Děčín)
- Hůrky (Rokycany)
- Hurtova Lhota (Havlíčkův Brod)
- Hůry (České Budějovice)
- Husí Lhota (Mladá Boleslav)
- Husinec (town; Prachatice)
- Husinec (Prague-East)
- Huslenky (Vsetín)
- Hustopeče nad Bečvou (market town; Přerov)
- Hustopeče (town; Břeclav)
- Huštěnovice (Uherské Hradiště)
- Hutisko-Solanec (Vsetín)
- Huzová (Olomouc)
- Hvězdlice (market town; Vyškov)
- Hvězdonice (Benešov)
- Hvězdoňovice (Třebíč)
- Hvozd (Plzeň-North)
- Hvozd (Prostějov)
- Hvozd (Rakovník)
- Hvozdec (Beroun)
- Hvozdec (Brno-Country)
- Hvozdec (České Budějovice)
- Hvozdná (Zlín)
- Hvozdnice (Hradec Králové)
- Hvozdnice (Prague-West)
- Hvožďany (Domažlice)
- Hvožďany (Příbram)
- Hybrálec (Jihlava)
- Hynčice (Náchod)
- Hynčina (Šumperk)
- Hýskov (Beroun)
- Hýsly (Hodonín)

== I ==
- Ivaň (Brno-Country)
- Ivaň (Prostějov)
- Ivančice (town; Brno-Country)
- Ivanovice na Hané (town; Vyškov)

== J ==
- Jabkenice (Mladá Boleslav)
- Jabloňany (Blansko)
- Jablonec nad Jizerou (town; Semily)
- Jablonec nad Nisou (city; Jablonec nad Nisou)
- Jablonná (Příbram)
- Jablonné nad Orlicí (town; Ústí nad Orlicí)
- Jablonné v Podještědí (town; Liberec)
- Jabloňov (Žďár nad Sázavou)
- Jablůnka (Vsetín)
- Jablunkov (town; Frýdek-Místek)
- Jáchymov (town; Karlovy Vary)
- Jahodov (Rychnov nad Kněžnou)
- Jakartovice (Opava)
- Jakubčovice nad Odrou (Nový Jičín)
- Jakubov u Moravských Budějovic (Třebíč)
- Jakubovice (Šumperk)
- Jalubí (Uherské Hradiště)
- Jamné nad Orlicí (Ústí nad Orlicí)
- Jamné (Jihlava)
- Jamolice (Znojmo)
- Jámy (Žďár nad Sázavou)
- Jankov (Benešov)
- Jankov (České Budějovice)
- Jankov (Pelhřimov)
- Jankovice (Kroměříž)
- Jankovice (Pardubice)
- Jankovice (Uherské Hradiště)
- Janoušov (Šumperk)
- Janov (town; Bruntál)
- Janov (Děčín)
- Janov (Rakovník)
- Janov (Rychnov nad Kněžnou)
- Janov (Svitavy)
- Janov nad Nisou (Jablonec nad Nisou)
- Janová (Vsetín)
- Janovice nad Úhlavou (town; Klatovy)
- Janovice v Podještědí (Liberec)
- Janovice (Frýdek-Místek)
- Janská (Děčín)
- Janské Lázně (town; Trutnov)
- Janův Důl (Liberec)
- Janůvky (Svitavy)
- Jarcová (Vsetín)
- Jarohněvice (Kroměříž)
- Jaroměř (town; Náchod)
- Jaroměřice nad Rokytnou (town; Třebíč)
- Jaroměřice (Svitavy)
- Jaroslav (Pardubice)
- Jaroslavice (Znojmo)
- Jarošov nad Nežárkou (Jindřichův Hradec)
- Jarošov (Svitavy)
- Jarov (Plzeň-South)
- Jarov (Plzeň-North)
- Jarpice (Kladno)
- Jasenice (Třebíč)
- Jasenná (Náchod)
- Jasenná (Zlín)
- Javor (Klatovy)
- Javorek (Žďár nad Sázavou)
- Javornice (Rychnov nad Kněžnou)
- Javorník (Benešov)
- Javorník (Hodonín)
- Javorník (town; Jeseník)
- Javorník (Svitavy)
- Javorník (Ústí nad Orlicí)
- Javůrek (Brno-Country)
- Jedlá (Havlíčkův Brod)
- Jedlany (Tábor)
- Jedlí (Šumperk)
- Jedlová (Svitavy)
- Jedomělice (Kladno)
- Jedousov (Pardubice)
- Jedovnice (market town; Blansko)
- Jehnědí (Ústí nad Orlicí)
- Jemnice (town; Třebíč)
- Jemníky (Kladno)
- Jenčice (Litoměřice)
- Jeneč (Prague-West)
- Jeníkov (Chrudim)
- Jeníkov (Teplice)
- Jeníkovice (Hradec Králové)
- Jeníkovice (Pardubice)
- Jenišov (Karlovy Vary)
- Jenišovice (Chrudim)
- Jenišovice (Jablonec nad Nisou)
- Jenštejn (Prague-East)
- Jeřice (Jičín)
- Jeřišno (Havlíčkův Brod)
- Jeřmanice (Liberec)
- Jersín (Jihlava)
- Jesenec (Prostějov)
- Jesenice (town; Prague-West)
- Jesenice (Příbram)
- Jesenice (town; Rakovník)
- Jeseník nad Odrou (Nový Jičín)
- Jeseník (town; Jeseník)
- Jesenný (Semily)
- Jestřabí Lhota (Kolín)
- Jestřabí v Krkonoších (Semily)
- Jestřabí (Zlín)
- Jestřebí (Česká Lípa)
- Jestřebí (Náchod)
- Jestřebí (Šumperk)
- Ješetice (Benešov)
- Jetětice (Písek)
- Jetřichov (Náchod)
- Jetřichovice (Děčín)
- Jevany (Kolín)
- Jevíčko (town; Svitavy)
- Jeviněves (Mělník)
- Jevišovice (town; Znojmo)
- Jevišovka (Břeclav)
- Jezbořice (Pardubice)
- Jezdkovice (Opava)
- Jezdovice (Jihlava)
- Jezernice (Přerov)
- Jezeřany-Maršovice (Znojmo)
- Ježená (Jihlava)
- Ježkovice (Vyškov)
- Ježov (Hodonín)
- Ježov (Pelhřimov)
- Ježovy (Klatovy)
- Jickovice (Písek)
- Jičín (town; Jičín)
- Jičíněves (Jičín)
- Jihlava (city; Jihlava)
- Jihlávka (Jihlava)
- Jíkev (Nymburk)
- Jilem (Havlíčkův Brod)
- Jilem (Jindřichův Hradec)
- Jilemnice (town; Semily)
- Jílové (town; Děčín)
- Jílové u Držkova (Jablonec nad Nisou)
- Jílové u Prahy (town; Prague-West)
- Jílovice (České Budějovice)
- Jílovice (Hradec Králové)
- Jíloviště (Prague-West)
- Jimlín (Louny)
- Jimramov (market town; Žďár nad Sázavou)
- Jinačovice (Brno-Country)
- Jince (market town; Příbram)
- Jindřichov (Bruntál)
- Jindřichov (Přerov)
- Jindřichov (Šumperk)
- Jindřichovice (Jihlava)
- Jindřichovice (Sokolov)
- Jindřichovice pod Smrkem (Liberec)
- Jindřichův Hradec (town; Jindřichův Hradec)
- Jinín (Strakonice)
- Jinočany (Prague-West)
- Jinolice (Jičín)
- Jinošov (Třebíč)
- Jiratice (Třebíč)
- Jiřetín pod Bukovou (Jablonec nad Nisou)
- Jiřetín pod Jedlovou (Děčín)
- Jiřice (Nymburk)
- Jiřice (Pelhřimov)
- Jiřice u Miroslavi (Znojmo)
- Jiřice u Moravských Budějovic (Znojmo)
- Jiříkov (Bruntál)
- Jiříkov (town; Děčín)
- Jiříkovice (Brno-Country)
- Jirkov (town; Chomutov)
- Jirny (Prague-East)
- Jistebnice (town; Tábor)
- Jistebník (Nový Jičín)
- Jitkov (Havlíčkův Brod)
- Jivina (Beroun)
- Jivina (Mladá Boleslav)
- Jívka (Trutnov)
- Jivno (České Budějovice)
- Jívová (Olomouc)
- Jívoví (Žďár nad Sázavou)
- Jizbice (Nymburk)
- Jizerní Vtelno (Mladá Boleslav)
- Josefov (Hodonín)
- Josefov (Sokolov)
- Josefův Důl (Jablonec nad Nisou)
- Josefův Důl (Mladá Boleslav)

== K ==
- Kacákova Lhota (Jičín)
- Kacanovy (Semily)
- Kaceřov (Plzeň-North)
- Kaceřov (Sokolov)
- Kačice (Kladno)
- Kačlehy (Jindřichův Hradec)
- Kácov (market town; Kutná Hora)
- Kadaň (town; Chomutov)
- Kadlín (Mělník)
- Kadolec (Žďár nad Sázavou)
- Kadov (Strakonice)
- Kadov (Znojmo)
- Kadov (Žďár nad Sázavou)
- Kájov (Český Krumlov)
- Kakejcov (Rokycany)
- Kalek (Chomutov)
- Kalenice (Strakonice)
- Kalhov (Jihlava)
- Kaliště (Jihlava)
- Kaliště (Pelhřimov)
- Kaliště (Prague-East)
- Kalivody (Rakovník)
- Kaly (Brno-Country)
- Kamberk (Benešov)
- Kámen (Děčín)
- Kámen (Havlíčkův Brod)
- Kámen (Pelhřimov)
- Kamenec u Poličky (Svitavy)
- Kamenec (Rokycany)
- Kamenice (market town; Jihlava)
- Kamenice (Prague-East)
- Kamenice nad Lipou (town; Pelhřimov)
- Kamenický Šenov (town; Česká Lípa)
- Kameničky (Chrudim)
- Kameničná (Ústí nad Orlicí)
- Kamenná (České Budějovice)
- Kamenná (Jihlava)
- Kamenná (Šumperk)
- Kamenná (Třebíč)
- Kamenná Horka (Svitavy)
- Kamenná Lhota (Havlíčkův Brod)
- Kamenné Zboží (Nymburk)
- Kamenné Žehrovice (Kladno)
- Kamenný Malíkov (Jindřichův Hradec)
- Kamenný Most (Kladno)
- Kamenný Přívoz (Prague-West)
- Kamenný Újezd (České Budějovice)
- Kamenný Újezd (Rokycany)
- Kamýk nad Vltavou (Příbram)
- Kamýk (Litoměřice)
- Kanice (Brno-Country)
- Kanice (Domažlice)
- Kaničky (Domažlice)
- Kanina (Mělník)
- Kaňovice (Frýdek-Místek)
- Kaňovice (Zlín)
- Kaplice (town; Český Krumlov)
- Káranice (Hradec Králové)
- Káraný (Prague-East)
- Kardašova Řečice (town; Jindřichův Hradec)
- Kařez (Rokycany)
- Kařízek (Rokycany)
- Karle (Svitavy)
- Karlík (Prague-West)
- Karlín (Hodonín)
- Karlov (Žďár nad Sázavou)
- Karlova Studánka (Bruntál)
- Karlova Ves (Rakovník)
- Karlovice (Bruntál)
- Karlovice (Semily)
- Karlovice (Zlín)
- Karlovy Vary (city; Karlovy Vary)
- Karlštejn (market town; Beroun)
- Karolín (Kroměříž)
- Karolinka (town; Vsetín)
- Karviná (city; Karviná)
- Kasalice (Pardubice)
- Kašava (Zlín)
- Kasejovice (town; Plzeň-South)
- Kašnice (Břeclav)
- Kašperské Hory (town; Klatovy)
- Kateřinice (Nový Jičín)
- Kateřinice (Vsetín)
- Katov (Brno-Country)
- Katov (Tábor)
- Katovice (market town; Strakonice)
- Katusice (Mladá Boleslav)
- Kaznějov (town; Plzeň-North)
- Kbel (Kolín)
- Kbel (Plzeň-South)
- Kbelany (Plzeň-North)
- Kbelnice (Jičín)
- Kdousov (Třebíč)
- Kdyně (town; Domažlice)
- Keblice (Litoměřice)
- Keblov (Benešov)
- Kejnice (Klatovy)
- Kejžlice (Pelhřimov)
- Kelč (town; Vsetín)
- Kelčany (Hodonín)
- Kelníky (Zlín)
- Kestřany (Písek)
- Ketkovice (Brno-Country)
- Klabava (Rokycany)
- Kladeruby nad Oslavou (Třebíč)
- Kladeruby (Vsetín)
- Kladky (Prostějov)
- Kladníky (Přerov)
- Kladno (Chrudim)
- Kladno (city; Kladno)
- Kladruby (Benešov)
- Kladruby (Rokycany)
- Kladruby (Strakonice)
- Kladruby (town; Tachov)
- Kladruby (Teplice)
- Kladruby nad Labem (Pardubice)
- Klamoš (Hradec Králové)
- Klapý (Litoměřice)
- Klášter Hradiště nad Jizerou (Mladá Boleslav)
- Klášter (Plzeň-South)
- Klášterec nad Ohří (town; Chomutov)
- Klášterec nad Orlicí (Ústí nad Orlicí)
- Klášterní Skalice (Kolín)
- Klášterská Lhota (Trutnov)
- Klatovec (Jihlava)
- Klatovy (town; Klatovy)
- Klec (Jindřichův Hradec)
- Klecany (town; Prague-East)
- Klenčí pod Čerchovem (market town; Domažlice)
- Kleneč (Litoměřice)
- Klenová (Klatovy)
- Klenovice (Tábor)
- Klenovice na Hané (Prostějov)
- Klentnice (Břeclav)
- Klešice (Chrudim)
- Klíčany (Prague-East)
- Klimkovice (town; Ostrava-City)
- Klínec (Prague-West)
- Klíny (Most)
- Klobouky u Brna (town; Břeclav)
- Klobuky (Kladno)
- Klokočí (Přerov)
- Klokočí (Semily)
- Klokočná (Prague-East)
- Klokočov (Havlíčkův Brod)
- Klopina (Šumperk)
- Klopotovice (Prostějov)
- Klučenice (Příbram)
- Klučov (Kolín)
- Klučov (Třebíč)
- Kluky (Kutná Hora)
- Kluky (Mladá Boleslav)
- Kluky (Písek)
- Kly (Mělník)
- Kmetiněves (Kladno)
- Kněždub (Hodonín)
- Kněževes (Blansko)
- Kněževes (Prague-West)
- Kněževes (market town; Rakovník)
- Kněževes (Žďár nad Sázavou)
- Kněžice (Chrudim)
- Kněžice (Jihlava)
- Kněžice (Nymburk)
- Kněžičky (Nymburk)
- Kněžmost (Mladá Boleslav)
- Kněžnice (Jičín)
- Kněžpole (Uherské Hradiště)
- Knínice (market town; Blansko)
- Knínice (Jihlava)
- Kňovice (Příbram)
- Knovíz (Kladno)
- Knyk (Havlíčkův Brod)
- Koberovice (Pelhřimov)
- Koberovy (Jablonec nad Nisou)
- Kobeřice u Brna (Vyškov)
- Kobeřice (Opava)
- Kobylá nad Vidnavkou (Jeseník)
- Kobylí (Břeclav)
- Kobylice (Hradec Králové)
- Kobylnice (Brno-Country)
- Kobylnice (Kutná Hora)
- Kobylnice (Mladá Boleslav)
- Kobyly (Liberec)
- Kocbeře (Trutnov)
- Kocelovice (Strakonice)
- Kochánky (Mladá Boleslav)
- Kochánov (Havlíčkův Brod)
- Koclířov (Svitavy)
- Kočí (Chrudim)
- Kočín (Plzeň-North)
- Kočov (Tachov)
- Kohoutov (Trutnov)
- Kojatice (Třebíč)
- Kojatín (Třebíč)
- Kojátky (Vyškov)
- Kojčice (Pelhřimov)
- Kojetice (Mělník)
- Kojetice (Třebíč)
- Kojetín (Havlíčkův Brod)
- Kojetín (town; Přerov)
- Kojice (Pardubice)
- Kokašice (Tachov)
- Kokory (Přerov)
- Kokořín (Mělník)
- Kolaje (Nymburk)
- Koldín (Ústí nad Orlicí)
- Koleč (Kladno)
- Kolešov (Rakovník)
- Kolešovice (Rakovník)
- Kolín (town; Kolín)
- Kolinec (market town; Klatovy)
- Kolomuty (Mladá Boleslav)
- Kolová (Karlovy Vary)
- Koloveč (market town; Domažlice)
- Kolšov (Šumperk)
- Komárno (Kroměříž)
- Komárov (market town; Beroun)
- Komárov (Olomouc)
- Komárov (Tábor)
- Komárov (Zlín)
- Komárovice (Třebíč)
- Komařice (České Budějovice)
- Komňa (Uherské Hradiště)
- Komorní Lhotka (Frýdek-Místek)
- Komorovice (Pelhřimov)
- Komořany (Vyškov)
- Konárovice (Kolín)
- Kondrac (Benešov)
- Konecchlumí (Jičín)
- Koněprusy (Beroun)
- Koněšín (Třebíč)
- Konětopy (Prague-East)
- Konice (town; Prostějov)
- Konojedy (Kolín)
- Konstantinovy Lázně (Tachov)
- Kopidlno (town; Jičín)
- Kopidlo (Plzeň-North)
- Kopřivná (Šumperk)
- Kopřivnice (town; Nový Jičín)
- Kořenec (Blansko)
- Kořenice (Kolín)
- Kořenov (Jablonec nad Nisou)
- Korkyně (Příbram)
- Kornatice (Rokycany)
- Korno (Beroun)
- Korolupy (Znojmo)
- Korouhev (Svitavy)
- Koroužné (Žďár nad Sázavou)
- Korozluky (Most)
- Koruna (Svitavy)
- Koryčany (town; Kroměříž)
- Koryta (Mladá Boleslav)
- Koryta (Plzeň-North)
- Korytná (Uherské Hradiště)
- Košařiska (Frýdek-Místek)
- Košátky (Mladá Boleslav)
- Košetice (Pelhřimov)
- Kosice (Hradec Králové)
- Košice (Kutná Hora)
- Košice (Tábor)
- Kosičky (Hradec Králové)
- Košík (Nymburk)
- Košíky (Uherské Hradiště)
- Košín (Tábor)
- Kosmonosy (town; Mladá Boleslav)
- Kosoř (Prague-West)
- Kosořice (Mladá Boleslav)
- Kosořín (Ústí nad Orlicí)
- Kosov (Šumperk)
- Kosova Hora (Příbram)
- Košťálov (Semily)
- Košťany (town; Teplice)
- Kostelany nad Moravou (Uherské Hradiště)
- Kostelany (Kroměříž)
- Kostelec (Hodonín)
- Kostelec (Jičín)
- Kostelec (Jihlava)
- Kostelec (Tachov)
- Kostelec na Hané (town; Prostějov)
- Kostelec nad Černými lesy (town; Kolín)
- Kostelec nad Labem (town; Mělník)
- Kostelec nad Orlicí (town; Rychnov nad Kněžnou)
- Kostelec nad Vltavou (Písek)
- Kostelec u Heřmanova Městce (Chrudim)
- Kostelec u Holešova (Kroměříž)
- Kostelec u Křížků (Prague-East)
- Kostelecké Horky (Rychnov nad Kněžnou)
- Kostelní Hlavno (Mladá Boleslav)
- Kostelní Lhota (Nymburk)
- Kostelní Myslová (Jihlava)
- Kostelní Radouň (Jindřichův Hradec)
- Kostelní Vydří (Jindřichův Hradec)
- Kostěnice (Pardubice)
- Kostice (Břeclav)
- Koštice (Louny)
- Kostníky (Třebíč)
- Kostomlátky (Nymburk)
- Kostomlaty nad Labem (Nymburk)
- Kostomlaty pod Milešovkou (Teplice)
- Kostomlaty pod Řípem (Litoměřice)
- Kotenčice (Příbram)
- Kotlasy (Žďár nad Sázavou)
- Kotopeky (Beroun)
- Kotovice (Plzeň-South)
- Kotvrdovice (Blansko)
- Kounice (market town; Nymburk)
- Kounov (Rakovník)
- Kounov (Rychnov nad Kněžnou)
- Koupě (Příbram)
- Kouřim (town; Kolín)
- Kout na Šumavě (Domažlice)
- Kouty (Havlíčkův Brod)
- Kouty (Nymburk)
- Kouty (Třebíč)
- Kovač (Jičín)
- Koválovice-Osíčany (Prostějov)
- Kovalovice (Brno-Country)
- Kováň (Mladá Boleslav)
- Kovanec (Mladá Boleslav)
- Kovanice (Nymburk)
- Kovářov (Písek)
- Kovářská (market town; Chomutov)
- Kovčín (Klatovy)
- Kozárov (Blansko)
- Kozárovice (Příbram)
- Kožichovice (Třebíč)
- Kožlany (town; Plzeň-North)
- Kozlany (Třebíč)
- Kozlany (Vyškov)
- Kožlí (Havlíčkův Brod)
- Kožlí (Písek)
- Kozlov (Havlíčkův Brod)
- Kozlov (Jihlava)
- Kozlov (Olomouc)
- Kozlov (Žďár nad Sázavou)
- Kozlovice (Frýdek-Místek)
- Kozlovice (Plzeň-South)
- Kozly (Česká Lípa)
- Kozly (Louny)
- Kozmice (Benešov)
- Kozmice (Opava)
- Kozojedy (Jičín)
- Kozojedy (Plzeň-North)
- Kozojedy (Prague-East)
- Kozojedy (Rakovník)
- Kozojídky (Hodonín)
- Kozolupy (Plzeň-North)
- Kozomín (Mělník)
- Kožušany-Tážaly (Olomouc)
- Kožušice (Vyškov)
- Krabčice (Litoměřice)
- Kraborovice (Havlíčkův Brod)
- Krahulčí (Jihlava)
- Krahulov (Třebíč)
- Krajková (Sokolov)
- Krajníčko (Strakonice)
- Krakov (Rakovník)
- Krakovany (Kolín)
- Krakovec (Rakovník)
- Kralice na Hané (market town; Prostějov)
- Kralice nad Oslavou (Třebíč)
- Králíky (Hradec Králové)
- Králíky (town; Ústí nad Orlicí)
- Králova Lhota (Písek)
- Králova Lhota (Rychnov nad Kněžnou)
- Královec (Trutnov)
- Kralovice (town; Plzeň-North)
- Královice (Kladno)
- Královské Poříčí (Sokolov)
- Kralupy nad Vltavou (town; Mělník)
- Králův Dvůr (town; Beroun)
- Kramolín (Plzeň-South)
- Kramolín (Třebíč)
- Kramolna (Náchod)
- Kraselov (Strakonice)
- Krásensko (Vyškov)
- Krasíkov (Ústí nad Orlicí)
- Krasíkovice (Pelhřimov)
- Kraslice (town; Sokolov)
- Krašlovice (Strakonice)
- Krásná (Cheb)
- Krásná (Frýdek-Místek)
- Krásná Hora (Havlíčkův Brod)
- Krásná Hora nad Vltavou (town; Příbram)
- Krásná Lípa (town; Děčín)
- Krásná Ves (Mladá Boleslav)
- Krásné (Chrudim)
- Krásné (Žďár nad Sázavou)
- Krásné Údolí (town; Karlovy Vary)
- Krásněves (Žďár nad Sázavou)
- Krásno (town; Sokolov)
- Krásný Dvůr (Louny)
- Krásný Les (Karlovy Vary)
- Krásný Les (Liberec)
- Krasonice (Jihlava)
- Krasov (Bruntál)
- Krasová (Blansko)
- Krašovice (Plzeň-North)
- Krátká Ves (Havlíčkův Brod)
- Kratochvilka (Brno-Country)
- Kratonohy (Hradec Králové)
- Krátošice (Tábor)
- Kratušín (Prachatice)
- Kravaře (Česká Lípa)
- Kravaře (town; Opava)
- Kravsko (Znojmo)
- Krchleby (Kutná Hora)
- Krchleby (Nymburk)
- Krchleby (Rychnov nad Kněžnou)
- Krchleby (Šumperk)
- Krčmaň (Olomouc)
- Křeč (Pelhřimov)
- Křečhoř (Kolín)
- Křečkov (Nymburk)
- Křečovice (Benešov)
- Krejnice (Strakonice)
- Křekov (Zlín)
- Křelov-Břuchotín (Olomouc)
- Křelovice (Pelhřimov)
- Křelovice (Plzeň-North)
- Křemže (market town; Český Krumlov)
- Křenek (Prague-East)
- Křenice (Klatovy)
- Křenice (Prague-East)
- Křenov (Svitavy)
- Křenovice (Písek)
- Křenovice (Přerov)
- Křenovice (Vyškov)
- Křenovy (Domažlice)
- Křepenice (Příbram)
- Křepice (Břeclav)
- Křepice (Znojmo)
- Křesetice (Kutná Hora)
- Křesín (Litoměřice)
- Křešice (Litoměřice)
- Křešín (Pelhřimov)
- Křešín (Příbram)
- Křetín (Blansko)
- Krhanice (Benešov)
- Krhov (Blansko)
- Krhov (Třebíč)
- Krhovice (Znojmo)
- Křičeň (Pardubice)
- Křídla (Žďár nad Sázavou)
- Křídlůvky (Znojmo)
- Křimov (Chomutov)
- Křinec (market town; Nymburk)
- Křinice (Náchod)
- Křišťanov (Prachatice)
- Křišťanovice (Bruntál)
- Křivoklát (market town; Rakovník)
- Křivsoudov (market town; Benešov)
- Křižánky (Žďár nad Sázavou)
- Křižanov (Písek)
- Křižanov (market town; Žďár nad Sázavou)
- Křižanovice (Chrudim)
- Křižanovice (Vyškov)
- Křižanovice u Vyškova (Vyškov)
- Křižany (Liberec)
- Křižínkov (Brno-Country)
- Křížkový Újezdec (Prague-East)
- Křižovatka (Cheb)
- Krmelín (Frýdek-Místek)
- Krňany (Benešov)
- Krnov (town; Bruntál)
- Krnsko (Mladá Boleslav)
- Krokočín (Třebíč)
- Kroměříž (town; Kroměříž)
- Krompach (Česká Lípa)
- Kropáčova Vrutice (Mladá Boleslav)
- Kroučová (Rakovník)
- Krouna (Chrudim)
- Křoví (Žďár nad Sázavou)
- Krsy (Plzeň-North)
- Křtěnov (Blansko)
- Křtiny (market town; Blansko)
- Křtomil (Přerov)
- Krtov (Tábor)
- Krty (Rakovník)
- Krty-Hradec (Strakonice)
- Krucemburk (market town; Havlíčkův Brod)
- Kruh (Semily)
- Krumsín (Prostějov)
- Krumvíř (Břeclav)
- Krupá (Kolín)
- Krupá (Rakovník)
- Krupka (town; Teplice)
- Krušovice (Rakovník)
- Kružberk (Opava)
- Krychnov (Kolín)
- Kryry (town; Louny)
- Kryštofovo Údolí (Liberec)
- Kryštofovy Hamry (Chomutov)
- Kšely (Kolín)
- Kšice (Tachov)
- Ktiš (Prachatice)
- Ktová (Semily)
- Kublov (Beroun)
- Kubova Huť (Prachatice)
- Kubšice (Znojmo)
- Kučerov (Vyškov)
- Kučeř (Písek)
- Kudlovice (Uherské Hradiště)
- Kuchařovice (Znojmo)
- Kujavy (Nový Jičín)
- Kukle (Svitavy)
- Kuklík (Žďár nad Sázavou)
- Kuks (Trutnov)
- Kulířov (Blansko)
- Kunčice nad Labem (Trutnov)
- Kunčice pod Ondřejníkem (Frýdek-Místek)
- Kunčice (Hradec Králové)
- Kunčina Ves (Blansko)
- Kunčina (Svitavy)
- Kundratice (Žďár nad Sázavou)
- Kunějovice (Plzeň-North)
- Kunemil (Havlíčkův Brod)
- Kunětice (Pardubice)
- Kunice (Blansko)
- Kunice (Prague-East)
- Kuničky (Blansko)
- Kunín (Nový Jičín)
- Kunkovice (Kroměříž)
- Kuňovice (Benešov)
- Kunovice (town; Uherské Hradiště)
- Kunovice (Vsetín)
- Kunratice (Děčín)
- Kunratice (Liberec)
- Kunratice u Cvikova (Česká Lípa)
- Kunštát (town; Blansko)
- Kunvald (market town; Ústí nad Orlicí)
- Kunžak (Jindřichův Hradec)
- Kupařovice (Brno-Country)
- Kurdějov (Břeclav)
- Kuřim (town; Brno-Country)
- Kuřimany (Strakonice)
- Kuřimská Nová Ves (Brno-Country)
- Kuřimské Jestřabí (Brno-Country)
- Kuroslepy (Třebíč)
- Kurovice (Kroměříž)
- Kutná Hora (town; Kutná Hora)
- Kutrovice (Kladno)
- Kuželov (Hodonín)
- Kvasice (Kroměříž)
- Kvasiny (Rychnov nad Kněžnou)
- Kváskovice (Strakonice)
- Kvášňovice (Klatovy)
- Květinov (Havlíčkův Brod)
- Květná (Svitavy)
- Květnice (Prague-East)
- Květov (Písek)
- Kvíčovice (Plzeň-South)
- Kvilda (Prachatice)
- Kvílice (Kladno)
- Kvítkov (Česká Lípa)
- Kvítkovice (České Budějovice)
- Kyje (Jičín)
- Kyjov (Havlíčkův Brod)
- Kyjov (town; Hodonín)
- Kyjov (Žďár nad Sázavou)
- Kyjovice (Opava)
- Kyjovice (Znojmo)
- Kynice (Havlíčkův Brod)
- Kynšperk nad Ohří (town; Sokolov)
- Kyselka (Karlovy Vary)
- Kyselovice (Kroměříž)
- Kyšice (Kladno)
- Kyšice (Plzeň-City)
- Kyškovice (Litoměřice)
- Kytín (Prague-West)
- Kytlice (Děčín)

== L ==
- Labská Stráň (Děčín)
- Labské Chrčice (Pardubice)
- Labuty (Hodonín)
- Lačnov (Vsetín)
- Ladná (Břeclav)
- Lahošt (Teplice)
- Lampertice (Trutnov)
- Lančov (Znojmo)
- Lánov (Trutnov)
- Lanškroun (town; Ústí nad Orlicí)
- Lány (Chrudim)
- Lány (Havlíčkův Brod)
- Lány (Kladno)
- Lány u Dašic (Pardubice)
- Lanžhot (town; Břeclav)
- Lanžov (Trutnov)
- Lásenice (Jindřichův Hradec)
- Laškov (Prostějov)
- Lašovice (Rakovník)
- Lavičky (Žďár nad Sázavou)
- Lavičné (Svitavy)
- Láz (Příbram)
- Láz (Třebíč)
- Lazinov (Blansko)
- Lázně Bělohrad (town; Jičín)
- Lázně Bohdaneč (town; Pardubice)
- Lázně Kynžvart (town; Cheb)
- Lázně Libverda (Liberec)
- Lázně Toušeň (market town; Prague-East)
- Lazníčky (Přerov)
- Lazníky (Přerov)
- Lazsko (Příbram)
- Lažánky (Brno-Country)
- Lažánky (Strakonice)
- Lažany (Blansko)
- Lažany (Liberec)
- Lažany (Strakonice)
- Lažiště (Prachatice)
- Lážovice (Beroun)
- Lčovice (Prachatice)
- Ledce (Brno-Country)
- Ledce (Hradec Králové)
- Ledce (Kladno)
- Ledce (Mladá Boleslav)
- Ledce (Plzeň-North)
- Ledčice (Mělník)
- Ledeč nad Sázavou (town; Havlíčkův Brod)
- Ledečko (Kutná Hora)
- Ledenice (market town; České Budějovice)
- Lednice (Břeclav)
- Ledvice (town; Teplice)
- Lechotice (Kroměříž)
- Lechovice (Znojmo)
- Lejšovka (Hradec Králové)
- Lelekovice (Brno-Country)
- Lenešice (Louny)
- Lenora (Prachatice)
- Lešany (Benešov)
- Lešany (Prostějov)
- Lešetice (Příbram)
- Leskovec (Vsetín)
- Leskovec nad Moravicí (Bruntál)
- Leškovice (Havlíčkův Brod)
- Leskovice (Pelhřimov)
- Lesná (Pelhřimov)
- Lesná (Tachov)
- Lesná (Třebíč)
- Lešná (Vsetín)
- Lesná (Znojmo)
- Lesní Hluboké (Brno-Country)
- Lesní Jakubov (Třebíč)
- Lesnice (Šumperk)
- Lesonice (Třebíč)
- Lesonice (Znojmo)
- Leština (Chrudim)
- Leština (Šumperk)
- Leština u Světlé (Havlíčkův Brod)
- Leštinka (Chrudim)
- Lestkov (Tachov)
- Lesůňky (Třebíč)
- Letiny (Plzeň-South)
- Letkov (Plzeň-City)
- Letohrad (town; Ústí nad Orlicí)
- Letonice (Vyškov)
- Letovice (town; Blansko)
- Lety (Písek)
- Lety (Prague-West)
- Levín (market town; Litoměřice)
- Levínská Olešnice (Semily)
- Lhánice (Třebíč)
- Lhenice (market town; Prachatice)
- Lhota-Vlasenice (Pelhřimov)
- Lhota (Kladno)
- Lhota (Prague-East)
- Lhota (Přerov)
- Lhota (Zlín)
- Lhota pod Hořičkami (Náchod)
- Lhota pod Libčany (Hradec Králové)
- Lhota pod Radčem (Rokycany)
- Lhota Rapotina (Blansko)
- Lhota u Lysic (Blansko)
- Lhota u Olešnice (Blansko)
- Lhota u Příbramě (Příbram)
- Lhota u Vsetína (Vsetín)
- Lhotice (Třebíč)
- Lhotka (Beroun)
- Lhotka (Frýdek-Místek)
- Lhotka (Jihlava)
- Lhotka (Mělník)
- Lhotka (Přerov)
- Lhotka (Žďár nad Sázavou)
- Lhotka nad Labem (Litoměřice)
- Lhotka u Litultovic (Opava)
- Lhotka u Radnic (Rokycany)
- Lhotky (Mladá Boleslav)
- Lhotsko (Zlín)
- Lhoty u Potštejna (Rychnov nad Kněžnou)
- Lhůta (Plzeň-City)
- Libá (Cheb)
- Libáň (town; Jičín)
- Libavské Údolí (Sokolov)
- Libčany (Hradec Králové)
- Libčeves (Louny)
- Libčice nad Vltavou (town; Prague-West)
- Libecina (Ústí nad Orlicí)
- Libědice (Chomutov)
- Liběchov (town; Mělník)
- Libějice (Tábor)
- Libějovice (Strakonice)
- Libel (Rychnov nad Kněžnou)
- Libenice (Kolín)
- Liberec (city; Liberec)
- Liberk (Rychnov nad Kněžnou)
- Libeř (Prague-West)
- Liběšice (Litoměřice)
- Liběšice (Louny)
- Libětice (Strakonice)
- Líbeznice (Prague-East)
- Libež (Benešov)
- Libchavy (Ústí nad Orlicí)
- Libchyně (Náchod)
- Libice nad Cidlinou (Nymburk)
- Libice nad Doubravou (market town; Havlíčkův Brod)
- Libín (České Budějovice)
- Libina (Šumperk)
- Libiš (Mělník)
- Libišany (Pardubice)
- Libkov (Domažlice)
- Libkov (Chrudim)
- Libkova Voda (Pelhřimov)
- Libkovice pod Řípem (Litoměřice)
- Liblice (Mělník)
- Liblín (market town; Rokycany)
- Libňatov (Trutnov)
- Libníč (České Budějovice)
- Libníkovice (Hradec Králové)
- Libočany (Louny)
- Libodřice (Kolín)
- Libochovany (Litoměřice)
- Libochovice (town; Litoměřice)
- Libochovičky (Kladno)
- Liboměřice (Chrudim)
- Libomyšl (Beroun)
- Libořice (Louny)
- Liboš (Olomouc)
- Libošovice (Jičín)
- Libotenice (Litoměřice)
- Libotov (Trutnov)
- Libouchec (Ústí nad Labem)
- Libovice (Kladno)
- Librantice (Hradec Králové)
- Libřice (Hradec Králové)
- Libštát (market town; Semily)
- Libuň (Jičín)
- Libušín (town; Kladno)
- Lichkov (Ústí nad Orlicí)
- Lichnov (Bruntál)
- Lichnov (Nový Jičín)
- Lichoceves (Prague-West)
- Licibořice (Chrudim)
- Lično (Rychnov nad Kněžnou)
- Lidečko (Vsetín)
- Lidice (Kladno)
- Lidmaň (Pelhřimov)
- Líně (Plzeň-North)
- Linhartice (Svitavy)
- Lípa (Havlíčkův Brod)
- Lípa (Zlín)
- Lípa nad Orlicí (Rychnov nad Kněžnou)
- Lipec (Kolín)
- Lipí (České Budějovice)
- Lipina (Olomouc)
- Lipinka (Šumperk)
- Lipnice nad Sázavou (town; Havlíčkův Brod)
- Lipník (Mladá Boleslav)
- Lipník (Třebíč)
- Lipník nad Bečvou (town; Přerov)
- Lipno (Louny)
- Lipno nad Vltavou (Český Krumlov)
- Lipoltice (Pardubice)
- Lipov (Hodonín)
- Lipová (Cheb)
- Lipová (Děčín)
- Lipová (Prostějov)
- Lipová (Přerov)
- Lipová (Zlín)
- Lipová-lázně (Jeseník)
- Lipovec (Blansko)
- Lipovec (Chrudim)
- Lipovice (Prachatice)
- Liptál (Vsetín)
- Liptaň (Bruntál)
- Lipůvka (Blansko)
- Lišany (Louny)
- Lišany (Rakovník)
- Lísek (Žďár nad Sázavou)
- Lišice (Hradec Králové)
- Líšina (Plzeň-South)
- Lískovice (Jičín)
- Líský (Kladno)
- Líšná (Přerov)
- Líšná (Rokycany)
- Líšná (Žďár nad Sázavou)
- Líšnice (Prague-West)
- Líšnice (Šumperk)
- Líšnice (Ústí nad Orlicí)
- Lišnice (Most)
- Líšný (Jablonec nad Nisou)
- Lišov (town; České Budějovice)
- Lisov (Plzeň-South)
- Líšťany (Louny)
- Líšťany (Plzeň-North)
- Líté (Plzeň-North)
- Liteň (market town; Beroun)
- Litenčice (market town; Kroměříž)
- Litíč (Trutnov)
- Litichovice (Benešov)
- Litoboř (Náchod)
- Litobratřice (Znojmo)
- Litohlavy (Rokycany)
- Litohoř (Třebíč)
- Litohošť (Pelhřimov)
- Litochovice (Strakonice)
- Litoměřice (town; Litoměřice)
- Litomyšl (town; Svitavy)
- Litostrov (Brno-Country)
- Litošice (Pardubice)
- Litovany (Třebíč)
- Litovel (town; Olomouc)
- Litultovice (market town; Opava)
- Litvínov (town; Most)
- Litvínovice (České Budějovice)
- Lkáň (Litoměřice)
- Lnáře (Strakonice)
- Lobeč (Mělník)
- Lobendava (Děčín)
- Lobodice (Přerov)
- Ločenice (České Budějovice)
- Loděnice (Beroun)
- Loděnice (Brno-Country)
- Lodhéřov (Jindřichův Hradec)
- Lodín (Hradec Králové)
- Lochenice (Hradec Králové)
- Lochousice (Plzeň-North)
- Lochovice (Beroun)
- Loket (Benešov)
- Loket (town; Sokolov)
- Lom (town; Most)
- Lom (Strakonice)
- Lom (Tábor)
- Lom u Tachova (Tachov)
- Lomec (Klatovy)
- Lomnice (market town; Brno-Country)
- Lomnice (Bruntál)
- Lomnice (Sokolov)
- Lomnice nad Lužnicí (town; Jindřichův Hradec)
- Lomnice nad Popelkou (town; Semily)
- Lomnička (Brno-Country)
- Lomy (Třebíč)
- Lopeník (Uherské Hradiště)
- Losiná (Plzeň-City)
- Lošany (Kolín)
- Loštice (town; Šumperk)
- Loučany (Olomouc)
- Loučeň (market town; Nymburk)
- Loučim (Domažlice)
- Loucká (Kladno)
- Loučka (Olomouc)
- Loučka (Vsetín)
- Loučka (Zlín)
- Loučky (Semily)
- Loučná nad Desnou (Šumperk)
- Loučná pod Klínovcem (town; Chomutov)
- Loučovice (Český Krumlov)
- Louka (Blansko)
- Louka (Hodonín)
- Louka u Litvínova (Most)
- Loukov (Kroměříž)
- Loukov (Mladá Boleslav)
- Loukovec (Mladá Boleslav)
- Loukovice (Třebíč)
- Louňová (Plzeň-South)
- Louňovice pod Blaníkem (market town; Benešov)
- Louňovice (Prague-East)
- Louny (town; Louny)
- Loužnice (Jablonec nad Nisou)
- Lovčice (Hodonín)
- Lovčice (Hradec Králové)
- Lovčičky (Vyškov)
- Lovčovice (Třebíč)
- Lovečkovice (Litoměřice)
- Lovosice (town; Litoměřice)
- Loza (Plzeň-North)
- Lozice (Chrudim)
- Lštění (Benešov)
- Lubě (Blansko)
- Lubenec (Louny)
- Luběnice (Olomouc)
- Lubná (Kroměříž)
- Lubná (Rakovník)
- Lubná (Svitavy)
- Lubné (Brno-Country)
- Lubnice (Znojmo)
- Lubník (Ústí nad Orlicí)
- Luboměř (Nový Jičín)
- Luboměř pod Strážnou (Olomouc)
- Luby (town; Cheb)
- Lučany nad Nisou (town; Jablonec nad Nisou)
- Lučice (Havlíčkův Brod)
- Lučina (Frýdek-Místek)
- Ludgeřovice (Opava)
- Ludíkov (Blansko)
- Ludkovice (Zlín)
- Ludmírov (Prostějov)
- Ludslavice (Kroměříž)
- Ludvíkov (Bruntál)
- Ludvíkovice (Děčín)
- Luhačovice (town; Zlín)
- Luka (Česká Lípa)
- Luká (Olomouc)
- Luka nad Jihlavou (market town; Jihlava)
- Lukavec (Litoměřice)
- Lukavec (market town; Pelhřimov)
- Lukavec u Hořic (Jičín)
- Lukavice (Chrudim)
- Lukavice (Rychnov nad Kněžnou)
- Lukavice (Šumperk)
- Lukavice (Ústí nad Orlicí)
- Lukov (Teplice)
- Lukov (Třebíč)
- Lukov (Zlín)
- Lukov (market town; Znojmo)
- Luková (Ústí nad Orlicí)
- Lukovany (Brno-Country)
- Lukoveček (Zlín)
- Luleč (Vyškov)
- Lupenice (Rychnov nad Kněžnou)
- Luštěnice (Mladá Boleslav)
- Lutín (Olomouc)
- Lutonina (Zlín)
- Lutopecny (Kroměříž)
- Lužany (Hradec Králové)
- Lužany (Jičín)
- Lužany (Plzeň-South)
- Lužce (Beroun)
- Luže (town; Chrudim)
- Lužec nad Cidlinou (Hradec Králové)
- Lužec nad Vltavou (Mělník)
- Luženičky (Domažlice)
- Lužice (Hodonín)
- Lužice (Most)
- Lužice (Olomouc)
- Lužice (Prachatice)
- Lužná (Rakovník)
- Lužná (Vsetín)
- Lužnice (Jindřichův Hradec)
- Lysá nad Labem (town; Nymburk)
- Lysice (market town; Blansko)
- Lysovice (Vyškov)

== M ==
- Machov (market town; Náchod)
- Machová (Zlín)
- Mackovice (Znojmo)
- Mačkov (Strakonice)
- Mahouš (Prachatice)
- Majdalena (Jindřichův Hradec)
- Majetín (Olomouc)
- Makotřasy (Kladno)
- Makov (Blansko)
- Makov (Svitavy)
- Malá Bystřice (Vsetín)
- Malá Hraštice (Příbram)
- Malá Lhota (Blansko)
- Malá Losenice (Žďár nad Sázavou)
- Malá Morava (Šumperk)
- Malá Morávka (Bruntál)
- Malá Roudka (Blansko)
- Malá Skála (Jablonec nad Nisou)
- Malá Štáhle (Bruntál)
- Malá Úpa (Trutnov)
- Malá Veleň (Děčín)
- Malá Víska (Beroun)
- Malá Vrbka (Hodonín)
- Malčín (Havlíčkův Brod)
- Malé Březno (Most)
- Malé Březno (Ústí nad Labem)
- Malé Hradisko (Prostějov)
- Malé Kyšice (Kladno)
- Malé Přítočno (Kladno)
- Malé Svatoňovice (Trutnov)
- Malé Výkleky (Pardubice)
- Malé Žernoseky (Litoměřice)
- Maleč (Havlíčkův Brod)
- Malečov (Ústí nad Labem)
- Malenice (Strakonice)
- Malenovice (Frýdek-Místek)
- Malešov (market town; Kutná Hora)
- Malešovice (Brno-Country)
- Maletín (Šumperk)
- Malhostovice (Brno-Country)
- Malhotice (Přerov)
- Malíč (Litoměřice)
- Malíkov (Svitavy)
- Malíkovice (Kladno)
- Malínky (Vyškov)
- Malinová (Rakovník)
- Málkov (Beroun)
- Málkov (Chomutov)
- Malonty (Český Krumlov)
- Malotice (Kolín)
- Malovice (Prachatice)
- Malšice (market town; Tábor)
- Malšín (Český Krumlov)
- Malšovice (Děčín)
- Malý Beranov (Jihlava)
- Malý Bor (Klatovy)
- Malý Újezd (Mělník)
- Manětín (town; Plzeň-North)
- Mankovice (Nový Jičín)
- Maňovice (Klatovy)
- Mariánské Lázně (town; Cheb)
- Mariánské Radčice (Most)
- Markvartice (Děčín)
- Markvartice (Jičín)
- Markvartice (Jihlava)
- Markvartice (Třebíč)
- Markvartovice (Opava)
- Maršov u Úpice (Trutnov)
- Maršov (Brno-Country)
- Maršovice (market town; Benešov)
- Maršovice (Jablonec nad Nisou)
- Martiněves (Litoměřice)
- Martinice (Kroměříž)
- Martinice (Žďár nad Sázavou)
- Martinice u Onšova (Pelhřimov)
- Martinice v Krkonoších (Semily)
- Martínkov (Třebíč)
- Martínkovice (Náchod)
- Mařenice (Česká Lípa)
- Máslojedy (Hradec Králové)
- Máslovice (Prague-East)
- Masojedy (Kolín)
- Mastník (Třebíč)
- Mašovice (Znojmo)
- Mašťov (town; Chomutov)
- Matějov (Žďár nad Sázavou)
- Mazelov (České Budějovice)
- Mažice (Tábor)
- Mcely (Nymburk)
- Meclov (Domažlice)
- Mečeříž (Mladá Boleslav)
- Měchenice (Prague-West)
- Měcholupy (market town; Louny)
- Měcholupy (Plzeň-South)
- Mečichov (Strakonice)
- Měčín (town; Klatovy)
- Měděnec (Chomutov)
- Medlice (Znojmo)
- Medlov (market town; Brno-Country)
- Medlov (Olomouc)
- Medlovice (Uherské Hradiště)
- Medlovice (Vyškov)
- Medonosy (Mělník)
- Medový Újezd (Rokycany)
- Měkynec (Strakonice)
- Melč (Opava)
- Mělčany (Brno-Country)
- Mělnické Vtelno (Mělník)
- Mělník (town; Mělník)
- Měňany (Beroun)
- Menhartice (Třebíč)
- Měník (Hradec Králové)
- Měnín (Brno-Country)
- Merboltice (Děčín)
- Měřín (market town; Žďár nad Sázavou)
- Merklín (Karlovy Vary)
- Merklín (Plzeň-South)
- Měrotín (Olomouc)
- Měrovice nad Hanou (Přerov)
- Měrunice (Teplice)
- Měšice (Prague-East)
- Měšín (Jihlava)
- Mešno (Rokycany)
- Městec Králové (town; Nymburk)
- Městečko (Rakovník)
- Městečko Trnávka (Svitavy)
- Město Albrechtice (town; Bruntál)
- Město Libavá (Olomouc)
- Město Touškov (town; Plzeň-North)
- Metylovice (Frýdek-Místek)
- Mezholezy (former Domažlice District) (Domažlice)
- Mezholezy (former Horšovský Týn District) (Domažlice)
- Meziboří (town; Most)
- Mezihoří (Klatovy)
- Mezilečí (Náchod)
- Mezilesí (Náchod)
- Mezilesí (Pelhřimov)
- Meziměstí (town; Náchod)
- Mezina (Bruntál)
- Meziříčí (Tábor)
- Meziříčko (Třebíč)
- Meziříčko (Žďár nad Sázavou)
- Mezná (Pelhřimov)
- Mezná (Tábor)
- Mezno (Benešov)
- Mezouň (Beroun)
- Míčov-Sušice (Chrudim)
- Mičovice (Prachatice)
- Michalovice (Havlíčkův Brod)
- Michalovice (Litoměřice)
- Míchov (Blansko)
- Mikolajice (Opava)
- Mikulášovice (town; Děčín)
- Mikulčice (Hodonín)
- Mikuleč (Svitavy)
- Mikulov (town; Břeclav)
- Mikulov (Teplice)
- Mikulovice (Jeseník)
- Mikulovice (Pardubice)
- Mikulovice (Třebíč)
- Mikulovice (market town; Znojmo)
- Mikulůvka (Vsetín)
- Milasín (Žďár nad Sázavou)
- Milavče (Domažlice)
- Milčice (Nymburk)
- Mileč (Plzeň-South)
- Milejovice (Strakonice)
- Milenov (Přerov)
- Milešín (Žďár nad Sázavou)
- Milešov (Příbram)
- Milešovice (Vyškov)
- Miletín (town; Jičín)
- Milevsko (town; Písek)
- Milhostov (Cheb)
- Miličín (town; Benešov)
- Milíčov (Jihlava)
- Milíčovice (Znojmo)
- Milíkov (Cheb)
- Milíkov (Frýdek-Místek)
- Milín (Příbram)
- Milínov (Plzeň-South)
- Milíře (Tachov)
- Milonice (Blansko)
- Milonice (Vyškov)
- Miloňovice (Strakonice)
- Milostín (Rakovník)
- Milotice nad Bečvou (Přerov)
- Milotice nad Opavou (Bruntál)
- Milotice (Hodonín)
- Milovice (Břeclav)
- Milovice (town; Nymburk)
- Milovice u Hořic (Jičín)
- Milý (Rakovník)
- Mimoň (town; Česká Lípa)
- Minice (Písek)
- Mirkovice (Český Krumlov)
- Miroslav (town; Znojmo)
- Miroslavské Knínice (Znojmo)
- Mirošov (Jihlava)
- Mirošov (town; Rokycany)
- Mirošov (Žďár nad Sázavou)
- Mirošovice (Prague-East)
- Mirotice (town; Písek)
- Mírov (Šumperk)
- Mírová pod Kozákovem (Semily)
- Mírová (Karlovy Vary)
- Mirovice (town; Písek)
- Miřejovice (Litoměřice)
- Miřetice (Benešov)
- Miřetice (Chrudim)
- Mířkov (Domažlice)
- Miskovice (Kutná Hora)
- Místo (Chomutov)
- Mistrovice (Ústí nad Orlicí)
- Mistřice (Uherské Hradiště)
- Míškovice (Kroměříž)
- Míšov (Plzeň-South)
- Mišovice (Písek)
- Mladá Boleslav (city; Mladá Boleslav)
- Mladá Vožice (town; Tábor)
- Mladé Bříště (Pelhřimov)
- Mladé Buky (market town; Trutnov)
- Mladecko (Opava)
- Mladeč (Olomouc)
- Mladějov na Moravě (Svitavy)
- Mladějov (Jičín)
- Mladějovice (Olomouc)
- Mladkov (market town; Ústí nad Orlicí)
- Mladoňovice (Chrudim)
- Mladoňovice (Třebíč)
- Mladošovice (České Budějovice)
- Mladotice (Plzeň-North)
- Mladý Smolivec (Plzeň-South)
- Mlázovice (market town; Jičín)
- Mlečice (Rokycany)
- Mlékojedy (Litoměřice)
- Mlékosrby (Hradec Králové)
- Mlýnské Struhadlo (Klatovy)
- Mlýny (Tábor)
- Mnetěš (Litoměřice)
- Mnich (Pelhřimov)
- Mnichov (Domažlice)
- Mnichov (Cheb)
- Mnichov (Strakonice)
- Mnichovice (Benešov)
- Mnichovice (town; Prague-East)
- Mnichovo Hradiště (town; Mladá Boleslav)
- Mníšek pod Brdy (town; Prague-West)
- Mníšek (Liberec)
- Močerady (Domažlice)
- Mochov (Prague-East)
- Mochtín (Klatovy)
- Močovice (Kutná Hora)
- Modlany (Teplice)
- Modletice (Prague-East)
- Modlíkov (Havlíčkův Brod)
- Modrá Hůrka (České Budějovice)
- Modrá (Uherské Hradiště)
- Modrava (Klatovy)
- Modřice (town; Brno-Country)
- Modřišice (Semily)
- Modřovice (Příbram)
- Mohelnice (Plzeň-South)
- Mohelnice (town; Šumperk)
- Mohelnice nad Jizerou (Mladá Boleslav)
- Mohelno (market town; Třebíč)
- Mojné (Český Krumlov)
- Mokošín (Pardubice)
- Mokrá-Horákov (Brno-Country)
- Mokré Lazce (Opava)
- Mokré (Rychnov nad Kněžnou)
- Mokrosuky (Klatovy)
- Mokrouše (Plzeň-City)
- Mokrovousy (Hradec Králové)
- Mokrovraty (Příbram)
- Mokrý Lom (České Budějovice)
- Moldava (Teplice)
- Morašice (Chrudim)
- Morašice (Pardubice)
- Morašice (Svitavy)
- Morašice (Znojmo)
- Moravany (Brno-Country)
- Moravany (Hodonín)
- Moravany (Pardubice)
- Moravec (Žďár nad Sázavou)
- Moravecké Pavlovice (Žďár nad Sázavou)
- Moraveč (Pelhřimov)
- Moravice (Opava)
- Moravičany (Šumperk)
- Morávka (Frýdek-Místek)
- Moravská Nová Ves (market town; Břeclav)
- Moravská Třebová (town; Svitavy)
- Moravské Bránice (Brno-Country)
- Moravské Budějovice (town; Třebíč)
- Moravské Knínice (Brno-Country)
- Moravské Málkovice (Vyškov)
- Moravskoslezský Kočov (Bruntál)
- Moravský Beroun (town; Olomouc)
- Moravský Krumlov (town; Znojmo)
- Moravský Písek (Hodonín)
- Moravský Žižkov (Břeclav)
- Morkovice-Slížany (town; Kroměříž)
- Morkůvky (Břeclav)
- Mořice (Prostějov)
- Mořina (Beroun)
- Mořinka (Beroun)
- Mořkov (Nový Jičín)
- Most (city; Most)
- Mostek (Trutnov)
- Mostek (Ústí nad Orlicí)
- Mostkovice (Prostějov)
- Mosty u Jablunkova (Frýdek-Místek)
- Mošnov (Nový Jičín)
- Mouchnice (Hodonín)
- Mouřínov (Vyškov)
- Moutnice (Brno-Country)
- Mrač (Benešov)
- Mrákotín (Chrudim)
- Mrákotín (market town; Jihlava)
- Mrákov (Domažlice)
- Mratín (Prague-East)
- Mrlínek (Kroměříž)
- Mrsklesy (Olomouc)
- Mrtník (Plzeň-North)
- Mrzky (Kolín)
- Mříčná (Semily)
- Mšec (market town; Rakovník)
- Mšecké Žehrovice (Rakovník)
- Mšené-lázně (Litoměřice)
- Mšeno (town; Mělník)
- Mukařov (Mladá Boleslav)
- Mukařov (Prague-East)
- Mutějovice (Rakovník)
- Mutěnice (Hodonín)
- Mutěnice (Strakonice)
- Mutěnín (Domažlice)
- Mutkov (Olomouc)
- Mydlovary (České Budějovice)
- Myslejovice (Prostějov)
- Mysletice (Jihlava)
- Mysletín (Pelhřimov)
- Mysliboř (Jihlava)
- Myslibořice (Třebíč)
- Myslín (Písek)
- Myslinka (Plzeň-North)
- Myslív (Klatovy)
- Myslkovice (Tábor)
- Mysločovice (Zlín)
- Myslovice (Klatovy)
- Myštěves (Hradec Králové)
- Myštice (Strakonice)
- Mýto (town; Rokycany)
- Mžany (Hradec Králové)

== N ==
- Nabočany (Chrudim)
- Načeradec (market town; Benešov)
- Načešice (Chrudim)
- Náchod (town; Náchod)
- Nadějkov (Tábor)
- Nadějov (Jihlava)
- Nadryby (Plzeň-North)
- Nahořany (Náchod)
- Nahošovice (Přerov)
- Náklo (Olomouc)
- Nákří (České Budějovice)
- Naloučany (Třebíč)
- Nalžovice (Příbram)
- Nalžovské Hory (town; Klatovy)
- Náměšť na Hané (market town; Olomouc)
- Náměšť nad Oslavou (town; Třebíč)
- Napajedla (town; Zlín)
- Nárameč (Třebíč)
- Narysov (Příbram)
- Nasavrky (town; Chrudim)
- Nasavrky (Tábor)
- Nasavrky (Ústí nad Orlicí)
- Násedlovice (Hodonín)
- Našiměřice (Znojmo)
- Návojná (Zlín)
- Návsí (Frýdek-Místek)
- Nebahovy (Prachatice)
- Nebanice (Cheb)
- Nebílovy (Plzeň-South)
- Nebovidy (Brno-Country)
- Nebovidy (Kolín)
- Nebřehovice (Strakonice)
- Nebužely (Mělník)
- Nechanice (town; Hradec Králové)
- Nechvalice (Příbram)
- Nechvalín (Hodonín)
- Nečín (Příbram)
- Nečtiny (Plzeň-North)
- Nedabyle (České Budějovice)
- Nedachlebice (Uherské Hradiště)
- Nedakonice (Uherské Hradiště)
- Nedašov (Zlín)
- Nedašova Lhota (Zlín)
- Neděliště (Hradec Králové)
- Nedomice (Mělník)
- Nedrahovice (Příbram)
- Nedvědice (market town; Brno-Country)
- Nedvězí (Svitavy)
- Nehodiv (Klatovy)
- Nehvizdy (market town; Prague-East)
- Nejdek (town; Karlovy Vary)
- Nejepín (Havlíčkův Brod)
- Nekmíř (Plzeň-North)
- Nekoř (Ústí nad Orlicí)
- Nekvasovy (Plzeň-South)
- Nelahozeves (Mělník)
- Nelepeč-Žernůvka (Brno-Country)
- Nelešovice (Přerov)
- Nemanice (Domažlice)
- Němčany (Vyškov)
- Němčice (Blansko)
- Němčice (Domažlice)
- Němčice (Kolín)
- Němčice (Kroměříž)
- Němčice (Mladá Boleslav)
- Němčice (Pardubice)
- Němčice (Prachatice)
- Němčice (Strakonice)
- Němčice (Svitavy)
- Němčice nad Hanou (town; Prostějov)
- Němčičky (Brno-Country)
- Němčičky (Břeclav)
- Němčičky (Znojmo)
- Němčovice (Rokycany)
- Němětice (Strakonice)
- Nemile (Šumperk)
- Nemíž (Benešov)
- Nemochovice (Vyškov)
- Nemojany (Vyškov)
- Nemojov (Trutnov)
- Nemotice (Vyškov)
- Nemyčeves (Jičín)
- Nemyslovice (Mladá Boleslav)
- Nemyšl (Tábor)
- Nenačovice (Beroun)
- Nenkovice (Hodonín)
- Neplachov (České Budějovice)
- Neplachovice (Opava)
- Nepolisy (Hradec Králové)
- Nepoměřice (Kutná Hora)
- Nepomuk (town; Plzeň-South)
- Nepomuk (Příbram)
- Nepomyšl (market town; Louny)
- Neprobylice (Kladno)
- Nepřevázka (Mladá Boleslav)
- Neratov (Pardubice)
- Neratovice (town; Mělník)
- Nerestce (Písek)
- Neslovice (Brno-Country)
- Nesovice (Vyškov)
- Nespeky (Benešov)
- Nestrašovice (Příbram)
- Nesuchyně (Rakovník)
- Nesvačilka (Brno-Country)
- Nesvačily (Beroun)
- Netín (Žďár nad Sázavou)
- Netolice (town; Prachatice)
- Netřebice (Český Krumlov)
- Netřebice (Nymburk)
- Netunice (Plzeň-South)
- Netvořice (market town; Benešov)
- Neubuz (Zlín)
- Neuměř (Plzeň-South)
- Neuměřice (Kladno)
- Neumětely (Beroun)
- Neurazy (Plzeň-South)
- Neustupov (market town; Benešov)
- Nevcehle (Jihlava)
- Neveklov (town; Benešov)
- Neveklovice (Mladá Boleslav)
- Nevězice (Písek)
- Nevid (Rokycany)
- Nevojice (Vyškov)
- Nevolice (Domažlice)
- Nevratice (Jičín)
- Nevřeň (Plzeň-North)
- Nezabudice (Rakovník)
- Nezabylice (Chomutov)
- Nezamyslice (Klatovy)
- Nezamyslice (market town; Prostějov)
- Nezbavětice (Plzeň-City)
- Nezdenice (Uherské Hradiště)
- Nezdice na Šumavě (Klatovy)
- Nezdice (Klatovy)
- Nezdřev (Plzeň-South)
- Nezvěstice (Plzeň-City)
- Nicov (Prachatice)
- Nihošovice (Strakonice)
- Níhov (Brno-Country)
- Nikolčice (Břeclav)
- Niměřice (Mladá Boleslav)
- Nimpšov (Třebíč)
- Nišovice (Strakonice)
- Nítkovice (Kroměříž)
- Niva (Prostějov)
- Nivnice (Uherské Hradiště)
- Nižbor (Beroun)
- Nížkov (Žďár nad Sázavou)
- Nížkovice (Vyškov)
- Nižní Lhoty (Frýdek-Místek)
- Norberčany (Olomouc)
- Nosálov (Mělník)
- Nosislav (market town; Brno-Country)
- Nošovice (Frýdek-Místek)
- Nová Buková (Pelhřimov)
- Nová Bystřice (town; Jindřichův Hradec)
- Nová Cerekev (market town; Pelhřimov)
- Nová Dědina (Kroměříž)
- Nová Hradečná (Olomouc)
- Nová Lhota (Hodonín)
- Nová Olešná (Jindřichův Hradec)
- Nová Paka (town; Jičín)
- Nová Pec (Prachatice)
- Nová Pláň (Bruntál)
- Nová Říše (market town; Jihlava)
- Nová Role (town; Karlovy Vary)
- Nová Sídla (Svitavy)
- Nová Telib (Mladá Boleslav)
- Nová Včelnice (town; Jindřichův Hradec)
- Nová Ves (Brno-Country)
- Nová Ves (České Budějovice)
- Nová Ves (Český Krumlov)
- Nová Ves (Domažlice)
- Nová Ves (Liberec)
- Nová Ves (Louny)
- Nová Ves (Mělník)
- Nová Ves (Plzeň-South)
- Nová Ves (Prague-East)
- Nová Ves (Rychnov nad Kněžnou)
- Nová Ves (Sokolov)
- Nová Ves (Strakonice)
- Nová Ves (Třebíč)
- Nová Ves (Žďár nad Sázavou)
- Nová Ves I (Kolín)
- Nová Ves nad Lužnicí (Jindřichův Hradec)
- Nová Ves nad Nisou (Jablonec nad Nisou)
- Nová Ves nad Popelkou (Semily)
- Nová Ves pod Pleší (Příbram)
- Nová Ves u Bakova (Mladá Boleslav)
- Nová Ves u Chotěboře (Havlíčkův Brod)
- Nová Ves u Chýnova (Tábor)
- Nová Ves u Jarošova (Svitavy)
- Nová Ves u Leštiny (Havlíčkův Brod)
- Nová Ves u Mladé Vožice (Tábor)
- Nová Ves u Nového Města na Moravě (Žďár nad Sázavou)
- Nová Ves u Světlé (Havlíčkův Brod)
- Nová Ves v Horách (Most)
- Nové Bránice (Brno-Country)
- Nové Dvory (market town; Kutná Hora)
- Nové Dvory (Litoměřice)
- Nové Dvory (Příbram)
- Nové Dvory (Žďár nad Sázavou)
- Nové Hamry (Karlovy Vary)
- Nové Heřminovy (Bruntál)
- Nové Hrady (town; České Budějovice)
- Nové Hrady (Chrudim)
- Nové Hutě (Prachatice)
- Nové Lublice (Opava)
- Nové Město na Moravě (town; Žďár nad Sázavou)
- Nové Město nad Metují (town; Náchod)
- Nové Město pod Smrkem (town; Liberec)
- Nové Město (Hradec Králové)
- Nové Mitrovice (Plzeň-South)
- Nové Sady (Vyškov)
- Nové Sady (Žďár nad Sázavou)
- Nové Sedlice (Opava)
- Nové Sedlo (Louny)
- Nové Sedlo (town; Sokolov)
- Nové Strašecí (town; Rakovník)
- Nové Syrovice (Třebíč)
- Nové Veselí (market town; Žďár nad Sázavou)
- Noviny pod Ralskem (Česká Lípa)
- Novosedlice (Teplice)
- Novosedly (Břeclav)
- Novosedly (Strakonice)
- Novosedly nad Nežárkou (Jindřichův Hradec)
- Nový Bor (town; Česká Lípa)
- Nový Bydžov (town; Hradec Králové)
- Nový Dům (Rakovník)
- Nový Dvůr (Nymburk)
- Nový Hrádek (market town; Náchod)
- Nový Hrozenkov (market town; Vsetín)
- Nový Jáchymov (Beroun)
- Nový Jičín (town; Nový Jičín)
- Nový Jimramov (Žďár nad Sázavou)
- Nový Knín (town; Příbram)
- Nový Kostel (Cheb)
- Nový Kramolín (Domažlice)
- Nový Malín (Šumperk)
- Nový Oldřichov (Česká Lípa)
- Nový Ples (Náchod)
- Nový Poddvorov (Hodonín)
- Nový Přerov (Břeclav)
- Nový Rychnov (market town; Pelhřimov)
- Nový Šaldorf-Sedlešovice (Znojmo)
- Nový Telečkov (Třebíč)
- Nový Vestec (Prague-East)
- Nučice (Prague-East)
- Nučice (Prague-West)
- Nupaky (Prague-East)
- Nýdek (Frýdek-Místek)
- Nyklovice (Žďár nad Sázavou)
- Nymburk (town; Nymburk)
- Nýřany (town; Plzeň-North)
- Nýrov (Blansko)
- Nýrsko (town; Klatovy)

== O ==
- Občov (Příbram)
- Obecnice (Příbram)
- Obědkovice (Prostějov)
- Obědovice (Hradec Králové)
- Obora (Blansko)
- Obora (Louny)
- Obora (Plzeň-North)
- Obora (Tachov)
- Oborná (Bruntál)
- Obory (Příbram)
- Obořiště (Příbram)
- Obrataň (Pelhřimov)
- Obříství (Mělník)
- Obrnice (Most)
- Obrubce (Mladá Boleslav)
- Obruby (Mladá Boleslav)
- Obyčtov (Žďár nad Sázavou)
- Obytce (Klatovy)
- Očelice (Rychnov nad Kněžnou)
- Ochoz u Brna (Brno-Country)
- Ochoz u Tišnova (Brno-Country)
- Ochoz (Prostějov)
- Očihov (Louny)
- Ocmanice (Třebíč)
- Odolena Voda (town; Prague-East)
- Odrava (Cheb)
- Odrovice (Brno-Country)
- Odry (town; Nový Jičín)
- Odřepsy (Nymburk)
- Odunec (Třebíč)
- Ohaře (Kolín)
- Ohařice (Jičín)
- Ohaveč (Jičín)
- Ohníč (Teplice)
- Ohnišov (Rychnov nad Kněžnou)
- Ohnišťany (Hradec Králové)
- Ohrazenice (Příbram)
- Ohrazenice (Semily)
- Ohrobec (Prague-West)
- Ohrozim (Prostějov)
- Okarec (Třebíč)
- Okna (Česká Lípa)
- Okoř (Prague-West)
- Okounov (Chomutov)
- Okrouhlá (Blansko)
- Okrouhlá (Česká Lípa)
- Okrouhlá (Cheb)
- Okrouhlá (Písek)
- Okrouhlá Radouň (Jindřichův Hradec)
- Okrouhlice (Havlíčkův Brod)
- Okrouhlička (Havlíčkův Brod)
- Okrouhlo (Prague-West)
- Okřesaneč (Kutná Hora)
- Okřešice (Třebíč)
- Okřínek (Nymburk)
- Okříšky (market town; Třebíč)
- Olbramice (Olomouc)
- Olbramice (Ostrava-City)
- Olbramkostel (market town; Znojmo)
- Olbramov (Tachov)
- Olbramovice (Benešov)
- Olbramovice (market town; Znojmo)
- Oldřichov (Přerov)
- Oldřichov (Tábor)
- Oldřichov v Hájích (Liberec)
- Oldřichovice (Zlín)
- Oldřiš (Svitavy)
- Oldřišov (Opava)
- Oleksovice (market town; Znojmo)
- Olešenka (Havlíčkův Brod)
- Oleška (Kolín)
- Oleško (Litoměřice)
- Olešná (Beroun)
- Olešná (Havlíčkův Brod)
- Olešná (Pelhřimov)
- Olešná (Písek)
- Olešná (Rakovník)
- Olešnice (town; Blansko)
- Olešnice (České Budějovice)
- Olešnice (Hradec Králové)
- Olešnice (Rychnov nad Kněžnou)
- Olešnice (Semily)
- Olešnice v Orlických horách (Rychnov nad Kněžnou)
- Olešník (České Budějovice)
- Olomouc (city; Olomouc)
- Olomučany (Blansko)
- Oloví (town; Sokolov)
- Olovnice (Kladno)
- Olšany (Jihlava)
- Olšany (Klatovy)
- Olšany (Šumperk)
- Olšany (Vyškov)
- Olšany u Prostějova (Prostějov)
- Olší (Brno-Country)
- Olší (Jihlava)
- Olšovec (Přerov)
- Olšovice (Prachatice)
- Omice (Brno-Country)
- Omlenice (Český Krumlov)
- Ondratice (Prostějov)
- Ondřejov (Pelhřimov)
- Ondřejov (Prague-East)
- Onomyšl (Kutná Hora)
- Onšov (Pelhřimov)
- Onšov (Znojmo)
- Opařany (Tábor)
- Opatov (Jihlava)
- Opatov (Svitavy)
- Opatov (market town; Třebíč)
- Opatovec (Svitavy)
- Opatovice (Brno-Country)
- Opatovice (Přerov)
- Opatovice I (Kutná Hora)
- Opatovice nad Labem (Pardubice)
- Opava (city; Opava)
- Oplany (Kolín)
- Oplocany (Přerov)
- Oplot (Plzeň-South)
- Opočnice (Nymburk)
- Opočno (Louny)
- Opočno (town; Rychnov nad Kněžnou)
- Opolany (Nymburk)
- Oponešice (Třebíč)
- Oprostovice (Přerov)
- Oráčov (Rakovník)
- Orel (Chrudim)
- Orlické Podhůří (Ústí nad Orlicí)
- Orlické Záhoří (Rychnov nad Kněžnou)
- Orličky (Ústí nad Orlicí)
- Orlík nad Vltavou (Písek)
- Orlová (town; Karviná)
- Orlovice (Vyškov)
- Ořech (Prague-West)
- Ořechov (Brno-Country)
- Ořechov (Jihlava)
- Ořechov (Uherské Hradiště)
- Ořechov (Žďár nad Sázavou)
- Osečany (Příbram)
- Oseček (Nymburk)
- Osečná (town; Liberec)
- Osečnice (Rychnov nad Kněžnou)
- Osek (Beroun)
- Osek (Jičín)
- Osek (Písek)
- Osek (Rokycany)
- Osek (Strakonice)
- Osek (town; Teplice)
- Osek nad Bečvou (Přerov)
- Oselce (Plzeň-South)
- Osice (Hradec Králové)
- Osíčko (Kroměříž)
- Osičky (Hradec Králové)
- Osík (Svitavy)
- Osiky (Brno-Country)
- Oskava (Šumperk)
- Oskořínek (Nymburk)
- Oslavany (town; Brno-Country)
- Oslavice (Žďár nad Sázavou)
- Oslavička (Třebíč)
- Oslnovice (Znojmo)
- Oslov (Písek)
- Osoblaha (Bruntál)
- Osov (Beroun)
- Osová Bítýška (Žďár nad Sázavou)
- Osové (Žďár nad Sázavou)
- Ostašov (Třebíč)
- Ostopovice (Brno-Country)
- Ostrá (Nymburk)
- Ostrata (Zlín)
- Ostrava (city; Ostrava-City)
- Ostravice (Frýdek-Místek)
- Ostrolovský Újezd (České Budějovice)
- Ostroměř (Jičín)
- Ostrov (Benešov)
- Ostrov (Havlíčkův Brod)
- Ostrov (Chrudim)
- Ostrov (town; Karlovy Vary)
- Ostrov (Příbram)
- Ostrov (Ústí nad Orlicí)
- Ostrov nad Oslavou (market town; Žďár nad Sázavou)
- Ostrov u Bezdružic (Plzeň-North)
- Ostrov u Macochy (market town; Blansko)
- Ostrovačice (market town; Brno-Country)
- Ostrovánky (Hodonín)
- Ostrovec-Lhotka (Rokycany)
- Ostrovec (Písek)
- Ostrožská Lhota (Uherské Hradiště)
- Ostrožská Nová Ves (Uherské Hradiště)
- Ostružná (Jeseník)
- Ostružno (Jičín)
- Ostředek (Benešov)
- Ostřešany (Pardubice)
- Ostřetice (Klatovy)
- Ostřetín (Pardubice)
- Osvětimany (market town; Uherské Hradiště)
- Osvračín (Domažlice)
- Ošelín (Tachov)
- Otaslavice (Prostějov)
- Otěšice (Plzeň-South)
- Otice (Opava)
- Otín (Jihlava)
- Otín (Žďár nad Sázavou)
- Otinoves (Prostějov)
- Otmarov (Brno-Country)
- Otmíče (Beroun)
- Otnice (Vyškov)
- Otov (Domažlice)
- Otovice (Karlovy Vary)
- Otovice (Náchod)
- Otradov (Chrudim)
- Otročín (Karlovy Vary)
- Otročiněves (Beroun)
- Otrokovice (town; Zlín)
- Otvice (Chomutov)
- Otvovice (Kladno)
- Ouběnice (Příbram)
- Oucmanice (Ústí nad Orlicí)
- Oudoleň (Havlíčkův Brod)
- Ovčáry (Kolín)
- Ovčáry (Mělník)
- Ovesná Lhota (Havlíčkův Brod)
- Ovesné Kladruby (Cheb)
- Oznice (Vsetín)

== P ==
- Paběnice (Kutná Hora)
- Pačejov (Klatovy)
- Paceřice (Liberec)
- Pacetluky (Kroměříž)
- Pačlavice (Kroměříž)
- Pacov (town; Pelhřimov)
- Páleč (Kladno)
- Palkovice (Frýdek-Místek)
- Palonín (Šumperk)
- Pálovice (Třebíč)
- Pamětice (Blansko)
- Panenská Rozsíčka (Jihlava)
- Panenské Břežany (Prague-East)
- Panenský Týnec (market town; Louny)
- Panoší Újezd (Rakovník)
- Panské Dubenky (Jihlava)
- Paračov (Strakonice)
- Pardubice (city; Pardubice)
- Paršovice (Přerov)
- Partutovice (Přerov)
- Pařezov (Domažlice)
- Pasečnice (Domažlice)
- Paseka (Olomouc)
- Paseky (Písek)
- Paseky nad Jizerou (Semily)
- Pašinka (Kolín)
- Paskov (town; Frýdek-Místek)
- Pasohlávky (Brno-Country)
- Pašovice (Uherské Hradiště)
- Pastuchovice (Plzeň-North)
- Pastviny (Ústí nad Orlicí)
- Pátek (Nymburk)
- Patokryje (Most)
- Pavlice (Znojmo)
- Pavlíkov (market town; Rakovník)
- Pavlínov (Žďár nad Sázavou)
- Pavlov (Břeclav)
- Pavlov (Havlíčkův Brod)
- Pavlov (Jihlava)
- Pavlov (Kladno)
- Pavlov (Pelhřimov)
- Pavlov (Šumperk)
- Pavlov (Žďár nad Sázavou)
- Pavlovice (Benešov)
- Pavlovice u Kojetína (Prostějov)
- Pavlovice u Přerova (Přerov)
- Pazderna (Frýdek-Místek)
- Pchery (Kladno)
- Pec (Domažlice)
- Peč (Jindřichův Hradec)
- Pec pod Sněžkou (town; Trutnov)
- Pěčice (Mladá Boleslav)
- Pečice (Příbram)
- Pěčín (Rychnov nad Kněžnou)
- Pecka (market town; Jičín)
- Pečky (town; Kolín)
- Pěčnov (Prachatice)
- Pelechy (Domažlice)
- Pelhřimov (town; Pelhřimov)
- Pěnčín (Jablonec nad Nisou)
- Pěnčín (Liberec)
- Pěnčín (Prostějov)
- Perálec (Chrudim)
- Peřimov (Semily)
- Perná (Břeclav)
- Pernarec (Plzeň-North)
- Pernink (Karlovy Vary)
- Pernštejnské Jestřabí (Brno-Country)
- Perštejn (Chomutov)
- Pertoltice (Kutná Hora)
- Pertoltice (Liberec)
- Pertoltice pod Ralskem (Česká Lípa)
- Peruc (market town; Louny)
- Pesvice (Chomutov)
- Pětihosty (Prague-East)
- Pětikozly (Mladá Boleslav)
- Pětipsy (Chomutov)
- Petkovy (Mladá Boleslav)
- Petráveč (Žďár nad Sázavou)
- Petříkov (České Budějovice)
- Petříkov (Prague-East)
- Petrohrad (Louny)
- Petroupim (Benešov)
- Petrov (Blansko)
- Petrov (Hodonín)
- Petrov (Prague-West)
- Petrovice (Blansko)
- Petrovice (Bruntál)
- Petrovice (Hradec Králové)
- Petrovice (Příbram)
- Petrovice (Rakovník)
- Petrovice (Třebíč)
- Petrovice (Ústí nad Labem)
- Petrovice (Ústí nad Orlicí)
- Petrovice (Znojmo)
- Petrovice I (Kutná Hora)
- Petrovice II (Kutná Hora)
- Petrovice u Karviné (Karviná)
- Petrovice u Sušice (Klatovy)
- Petrovičky (Jičín)
- Petrůvka (Zlín)
- Petrůvky (Třebíč)
- Petřvald (town; Karviná)
- Petřvald (Nový Jičín)
- Pičín (Příbram)
- Pikárec (Žďár nad Sázavou)
- Pila (Karlovy Vary)
- Pilníkov (town; Trutnov)
- Písařov (Šumperk)
- Písečná (Frýdek-Místek)
- Písečná (Jeseník)
- Písečná (Ústí nad Orlicí)
- Písečné (Jindřichův Hradec)
- Písečné (Žďár nad Sázavou)
- Písek (Frýdek-Místek)
- Písek (Hradec Králové)
- Písek (town; Písek)
- Písková Lhota (Mladá Boleslav)
- Písková Lhota (Nymburk)
- Píšť (Opava)
- Píšť (Pelhřimov)
- Píšťany (Litoměřice)
- Pištín (České Budějovice)
- Pístina (Jindřichův Hradec)
- Písty (Nymburk)
- Pitín (Uherské Hradiště)
- Pivín (Prostějov)
- Pivkovice (Strakonice)
- Planá (České Budějovice)
- Planá (town; Tachov)
- Planá nad Lužnicí (town; Tábor)
- Plaňany (market town; Kolín)
- Plandry (Jihlava)
- Pláně (Plzeň-North)
- Plánice (town; Klatovy)
- Plasy (town; Plzeň-North)
- Plav (České Budějovice)
- Plaveč (Znojmo)
- Plavsko (Jindřichův Hradec)
- Plavy (Jablonec nad Nisou)
- Plazy (Mladá Boleslav)
- Plenkovice (Znojmo)
- Plesná (town; Cheb)
- Pleše (Jindřichův Hradec)
- Plešnice (Plzeň-North)
- Pletený Újezd (Kladno)
- Plch (Pardubice)
- Plchov (Kladno)
- Plchovice (Ústí nad Orlicí)
- Plískov (Rokycany)
- Ploskovice (Litoměřice)
- Pluhův Žďár (Jindřichův Hradec)
- Plumlov (town; Prostějov)
- Plužná (Mladá Boleslav)
- Plzeň (city; Plzeň-City)
- Pnětluky (Louny)
- Pňov-Předhradí (Nymburk)
- Pňovany (Plzeň-North)
- Pňovice (Olomouc)
- Poběžovice (town; Domažlice)
- Poběžovice u Holic (Pardubice)
- Poběžovice u Přelouče (Pardubice)
- Počaply (Příbram)
- Počátky (town; Pelhřimov)
- Počedělice (Louny)
- Počenice-Tetětice (Kroměříž)
- Počepice (Příbram)
- Pocinovice (Domažlice)
- Počítky (Žďár nad Sázavou)
- Podbořanský Rohozec (Louny)
- Podbořany (town; Louny)
- Podbrdy (Beroun)
- Podbřezí (Rychnov nad Kněžnou)
- Podbřežice (Vyškov)
- Poděbrady (town; Nymburk)
- Poděšín (Žďár nad Sázavou)
- Poděvousy (Domažlice)
- Podhořany u Ronova (Chrudim)
- Podhorní Újezd a Vojice (Jičín)
- Podhradí (Cheb)
- Podhradí (market town; Jičín)
- Podhradí (Zlín)
- Podhradí nad Dyjí (Znojmo)
- Podhradní Lhota (Kroměříž)
- Podivice (Vyškov)
- Podivín (town; Břeclav)
- Podkopná Lhota (Zlín)
- Podlesí (Příbram)
- Podlesí (Ústí nad Orlicí)
- Podlešín (Kladno)
- Podluhy (Beroun)
- Podmoklany (Havlíčkův Brod)
- Podmokly (Klatovy)
- Podmokly (Rokycany)
- Podmoky (Havlíčkův Brod)
- Podmoky (Nymburk)
- Podmolí (Znojmo)
- Podmyče (Znojmo)
- Podolanka (Prague-East)
- Podolí (Brno-Country)
- Podolí (Přerov)
- Podolí (Uherské Hradiště)
- Podolí (Vsetín)
- Podolí (Žďár nad Sázavou)
- Podolí I (Písek)
- Podomí (Vyškov)
- Podsedice (Litoměřice)
- Podůlšany (Pardubice)
- Podůlší (Jičín)
- Podveky (Kutná Hora)
- Pohled (Havlíčkův Brod)
- Pohleď (Havlíčkův Brod)
- Pohledy (Svitavy)
- Pohnánec (Tábor)
- Pohnání (Tábor)
- Pohořelice (town; Brno-Country)
- Pohořelice (Zlín)
- Pohorovice (Strakonice)
- Pohorská Ves (Český Krumlov)
- Pohoří (Prague-West)
- Pohoří (Rychnov nad Kněžnou)
- Pochvalov (Rakovník)
- Pojbuky (Tábor)
- Pokojov (Žďár nad Sázavou)
- Pokojovice (Třebíč)
- Pokřikov (Chrudim)
- Polánka (Plzeň-South)
- Poleň (Klatovy)
- Polepy (Kolín)
- Polepy (Litoměřice)
- Polerady (Most)
- Polerady (Prague-East)
- Polesí (Pelhřimov)
- Polešovice (market town; Uherské Hradiště)
- Polevsko (Česká Lípa)
- Police (Šumperk)
- Police (Třebíč)
- Police (Vsetín)
- Police nad Metují (town; Náchod)
- Polička (town; Svitavy)
- Polkovice (Přerov)
- Polná (town; Jihlava)
- Polní Chrčice (Kolín)
- Polní Voděrady (Kolín)
- Polnička (Žďár nad Sázavou)
- Polom (Přerov)
- Polom (Rychnov nad Kněžnou)
- Polomí (Prostějov)
- Polště (Jindřichův Hradec)
- Pomezí nad Ohří (Cheb)
- Pomezí (Svitavy)
- Ponědraž (Jindřichův Hradec)
- Ponědrážka (Jindřichův Hradec)
- Ponětovice (Brno-Country)
- Poniklá (Semily)
- Popelín (Jindřichův Hradec)
- Popice (Břeclav)
- Popovice (Benešov)
- Popovice (Brno-Country)
- Popovice (Uherské Hradiště)
- Popovičky (Prague-East)
- Popůvky (Brno-Country)
- Popůvky (Třebíč)
- Poříčany (Kolín)
- Poříčí nad Sázavou (Benešov)
- Poříčí u Litomyšle (Svitavy)
- Pošná (Pelhřimov)
- Postoloprty (town; Louny)
- Poštovice (Kladno)
- Postřekov (Domažlice)
- Postřelmov (Šumperk)
- Postřelmůvek (Šumperk)
- Postřižín (Prague-East)
- Postupice (Benešov)
- Poteč (Zlín)
- Potěhy (Kutná Hora)
- Potštát (town; Přerov)
- Potštejn (Rychnov nad Kněžnou)
- Potůčky (Karlovy Vary)
- Potvorov (Plzeň-North)
- Poustka (Cheb)
- Pouzdřany (Břeclav)
- Povrly (Ústí nad Labem)
- Pozďatín (Třebíč)
- Pozděchov (Vsetín)
- Pozdeň (Kladno)
- Pozlovice (market town; Zlín)
- Pozořice (market town; Brno-Country)
- Prace (Brno-Country)
- Práče (Znojmo)
- Pracejovice (Strakonice)
- Prachatice (town; Prachatice)
- Prachovice (Chrudim)
- Prackovice nad Labem (Litoměřice)
- Prádlo (Plzeň-South)
- Praha (capital city; special status)
- Prakšice (Uherské Hradiště)
- Prameny (Cheb)
- Prasek (Hradec Králové)
- Praskačka (Hradec Králové)
- Prasklice (Kroměříž)
- Praskolesy (Beroun)
- Prášily (Klatovy)
- Přáslavice (Olomouc)
- Pravčice (Kroměříž)
- Pravice (Znojmo)
- Pravlov (Brno-Country)
- Pravonín (Benešov)
- Pravy (Pardubice)
- Pražmo (Frýdek-Místek)
- Přeborov (Písek)
- Přebuz (town; Sokolov)
- Přechovice (Strakonice)
- Přeckov (Třebíč)
- Předboj (Prague-East)
- Předenice (Plzeň-South)
- Předhradí (Chrudim)
- Předín (Třebíč)
- Předklášteří (Brno-Country)
- Předměřice nad Jizerou (Mladá Boleslav)
- Předměřice nad Labem (Hradec Králové)
- Předmíř (Strakonice)
- Přední Výtoň (Český Krumlov)
- Přední Zborovice (Strakonice)
- Předotice (Písek)
- Předslav (Klatovy)
- Předslavice (Strakonice)
- Přehořov (Tábor)
- Přehvozdí (Kolín)
- Přehýšov (Plzeň-North)
- Přelíc (Kladno)
- Přelouč (town; Pardubice)
- Přelovice (Pardubice)
- Přemyslovice (Prostějov)
- Přepeře (Mladá Boleslav)
- Přepeře (Semily)
- Přepychy (Pardubice)
- Přepychy (Rychnov nad Kněžnou)
- Přerov nad Labem (Nymburk)
- Přerov (city; Přerov)
- Přerubenice (Rakovník)
- Přeskače (Znojmo)
- Přestanov (Ústí nad Labem)
- Přestavlky (Chrudim)
- Přestavlky (Litoměřice)
- Přestavlky (Plzeň-South)
- Přestavlky (Přerov)
- Přestavlky u Čerčan (Benešov)
- Přešovice (Třebíč)
- Přeštěnice (Písek)
- Přeštice (town; Plzeň-South)
- Přešťovice (Strakonice)
- Převýšov (Hradec Králové)
- Přezletice (Prague-East)
- Přibice (Brno-Country)
- Příbor (town; Nový Jičín)
- Příbram (town; Příbram)
- Příbram na Moravě (Brno-Country)
- Příbraz (Jindřichův Hradec)
- Přibyslav (town; Havlíčkův Brod)
- Přibyslav (Náchod)
- Přibyslavice (Brno-Country)
- Přibyslavice (Třebíč)
- Příchovice (Plzeň-South)
- Příčina (Rakovník)
- Příčovy (Příbram)
- Přídolí (market town; Český Krumlov)
- Příkazy (Olomouc)
- Příkosice (Rokycany)
- Příkrý (Semily)
- Přílepy (Kroměříž)
- Přílepy (Rakovník)
- Příluka (Svitavy)
- Přimda (town; Tachov)
- Přísečná (Český Krumlov)
- Příseka (Havlíčkův Brod)
- Přísnotice (Brno-Country)
- Přistoupim (Kolín)
- Přišimasy (Kolín)
- Příšov (Plzeň-North)
- Příšovice (Liberec)
- Příštpo (Třebíč)
- Přítluky (Břeclav)
- Přívětice (Rokycany)
- Přívrat (Ústí nad Orlicí)
- Prlov (Vsetín)
- Proboštov (Teplice)
- Probulov (Písek)
- Prodašice (Mladá Boleslav)
- Prokopov (Znojmo)
- Proruby (Rychnov nad Kněžnou)
- Proseč (town; Chrudim)
- Proseč (Pelhřimov)
- Proseč pod Ještědem (Liberec)
- Proseč pod Křemešníkem (Pelhřimov)
- Prosečné (Trutnov)
- Prosenice (Přerov)
- Prosenická Lhota (Příbram)
- Prosetín (Chrudim)
- Prosetín (Žďár nad Sázavou)
- Prosíčka (Havlíčkův Brod)
- Prosiměřice (market town; Znojmo)
- Prostějov (city; Prostějov)
- Prostějovičky (Prostějov)
- Prostiboř (Tachov)
- Prostřední Bečva (Vsetín)
- Prostřední Poříčí (Blansko)
- Protivanov (market town; Prostějov)
- Protivín (town; Písek)
- Provodín (Česká Lípa)
- Provodov-Šonov (Náchod)
- Provodov (Zlín)
- Provodovice (Přerov)
- Prštice (Brno-Country)
- Průhonice (Prague-West)
- Prušánky (Hodonín)
- Prusice (Kolín)
- Prusinovice (Kroměříž)
- Prusy-Boškůvky (Vyškov)
- Prysk (Česká Lípa)
- Pržno (Frýdek-Místek)
- Pržno (Vsetín)
- Pšánky (Hradec Králové)
- Psárov (Tábor)
- Psáry (Prague-West)
- Psáře (Benešov)
- Pšov (Karlovy Vary)
- Pšovlky (Rakovník)
- Pstruží (Frýdek-Místek)
- Ptení (Prostějov)
- Ptenín (Plzeň-South)
- Ptice (Prague-West)
- Ptýrov (Mladá Boleslav)
- Puclice (Domažlice)
- Pucov (Třebíč)
- Puchlovice (Hradec Králové)
- Puklice (Jihlava)
- Pulečný (Jablonec nad Nisou)
- Pustá Kamenice (Svitavy)
- Pustá Polom (Opava)
- Pustá Rybná (Svitavy)
- Pustějov (Nový Jičín)
- Pustiměř (Vyškov)
- Pustina (Ústí nad Orlicí)
- Pustověty (Rakovník)
- Putim (Písek)
- Putimov (Pelhřimov)
- Pyšel (Třebíč)
- Pyšely (town; Benešov)

== R ==
- Rabakov (Mladá Boleslav)
- Rabí (town; Klatovy)
- Rabštejnská Lhota (Chrudim)
- Ráby (Pardubice)
- Rabyně (Benešov)
- Racková (Zlín)
- Rácovice (Třebíč)
- Račetice (Chomutov)
- Račice (Litoměřice)
- Račice (Rakovník)
- Račice (Třebíč)
- Račice (Žďár nad Sázavou)
- Račice-Pístovice (Vyškov)
- Račice nad Trotinou (Hradec Králové)
- Račín (Žďár nad Sázavou)
- Račiněves (Litoměřice)
- Radčice (Jablonec nad Nisou)
- Radějov (Hodonín)
- Radějovice (Prague-East)
- Radějovice (Strakonice)
- Radenice (Žďár nad Sázavou)
- Radenín (Tábor)
- Radešín (Žďár nad Sázavou)
- Radešínská Svratka (Žďár nad Sázavou)
- Radětice (Příbram)
- Radětice (Tábor)
- Radhostice (Prachatice)
- Radhošť (Ústí nad Orlicí)
- Radíč (Příbram)
- Radíkov (Přerov)
- Radíkovice (Hradec Králové)
- Radim (Jičín)
- Radim (Kolín)
- Radiměř (market town; Svitavy)
- Radimovice (Liberec)
- Radimovice u Tábora (Tábor)
- Radimovice u Želče (Tábor)
- Radkov (Jihlava)
- Radkov (Opava)
- Radkov (Svitavy)
- Radkov (Tábor)
- Radkov (Žďár nad Sázavou)
- Radkova Lhota (Přerov)
- Radkovice (Plzeň-South)
- Radkovice u Budče (Třebíč)
- Radkovice u Hrotovic (Třebíč)
- Radkovy (Přerov)
- Rádlo (Jablonec nad Nisou)
- Radnice (town; Rokycany)
- Radňoves (Žďár nad Sázavou)
- Radňovice (Žďár nad Sázavou)
- Radomyšl (market town; Strakonice)
- Radonice (Chomutov)
- Radonice (Prague-East)
- Radonín (Třebíč)
- Radostice (Brno-Country)
- Radostín (Havlíčkův Brod)
- Radostín (Žďár nad Sázavou)
- Radostín nad Oslavou (market town; Žďár nad Sázavou)
- Radostná pod Kozákovem (Semily)
- Radostov (Hradec Králové)
- Radošov (Třebíč)
- Radošovice (Benešov)
- Radošovice (České Budějovice)
- Radošovice (Strakonice)
- Radotice (Třebíč)
- Radotín (Přerov)
- Radovesice (Litoměřice)
- Radovesnice I (Kolín)
- Radovesnice II (Kolín)
- Radslavice (Přerov)
- Radslavice (Vyškov)
- Raduň (Opava)
- Radvanec (Česká Lípa)
- Radvanice (Přerov)
- Radvanice (Trutnov)
- Rájec (Šumperk)
- Rájec-Jestřebí (town; Blansko)
- Ráječko (Blansko)
- Rajhrad (town; Brno-Country)
- Rajhradice (Brno-Country)
- Rajnochovice (Kroměříž)
- Rakousy (Semily)
- Rakov (Přerov)
- Raková u Konice (Prostějov)
- Raková (Rokycany)
- Rakovice (Písek)
- Rakovník (town; Rakovník)
- Rakůvka (Prostějov)
- Rakvice (Břeclav)
- Ralsko (town; Česká Lípa)
- Raná (Chrudim)
- Raná (Louny)
- Rančířov (Jihlava)
- Rantířov (Jihlava)
- Rapotice (Třebíč)
- Rapotín (Šumperk)
- Rapšach (Jindřichův Hradec)
- Rašín (Jičín)
- Raškovice (Frýdek-Místek)
- Řásná (Jihlava)
- Rasošky (Náchod)
- Rašov (Brno-Country)
- Rašovice (Kutná Hora)
- Rašovice (Vyškov)
- Raspenava (town; Liberec)
- Rataje (Benešov)
- Rataje (Kroměříž)
- Rataje (Tábor)
- Rataje nad Sázavou (market town; Kutná Hora)
- Ratboř (Kolín)
- Ratenice (Kolín)
- Ratiboř (Jindřichův Hradec)
- Ratiboř (Vsetín)
- Ratibořské Hory (Tábor)
- Ratíškovice (Hodonín)
- Ratměřice (Benešov)
- Razová (Bruntál)
- Ražice (Písek)
- Rebešovice (Brno-Country)
- Řečany nad Labem (Pardubice)
- Řečice (Pelhřimov)
- Řečice (Žďár nad Sázavou)
- Řehenice (Prague-East)
- Řehlovice (Ústí nad Labem)
- Rejchartice (Šumperk)
- Rejštejn (town; Klatovy)
- Řeka (Frýdek-Místek)
- Řemíčov (Tábor)
- Řenče (Plzeň-South)
- Řendějov (Kutná Hora)
- Řepeč (Tábor)
- Řepice (Strakonice)
- Řepín (Mělník)
- Řepiště (Frýdek-Místek)
- Řepníky (Ústí nad Orlicí)
- Řepov (Mladá Boleslav)
- Řeřichy (Rakovník)
- Rešice (Znojmo)
- Řestoky (Chrudim)
- Řetová (Ústí nad Orlicí)
- Řetůvka (Ústí nad Orlicí)
- Řevnice (town; Prague-West)
- Řevničov (Rakovník)
- Řícmanice (Brno-Country)
- Říčany (Brno-Country)
- Říčany (town; Prague-East)
- Říčky (Brno-Country)
- Říčky v Orlických horách (Rychnov nad Kněžnou)
- Řídeč (Olomouc)
- Řídelov (Jihlava)
- Řídký (Svitavy)
- Řikonín (Brno-Country)
- Říkov (Náchod)
- Říkovice (Přerov)
- Římov (České Budějovice)
- Římov (Třebíč)
- Řimovice (Benešov)
- Řípec (Tábor)
- Řisuty (Kladno)
- Řitka (Prague-West)
- Řitonice (Mladá Boleslav)
- Roblín (Prague-West)
- Ročov (market town; Louny)
- Rodinov (Pelhřimov)
- Rodkov (Žďár nad Sázavou)
- Rodná (Tábor)
- Rodvínov (Jindřichův Hradec)
- Rohatec (Hodonín)
- Rohatsko (Mladá Boleslav)
- Rohenice (Rychnov nad Kněžnou)
- Rohle (Šumperk)
- Rohov (Opava)
- Rohovládova Bělá (Pardubice)
- Rohozec (Brno-Country)
- Rohozec (Kutná Hora)
- Rohozná (Jihlava)
- Rohozná (Svitavy)
- Rohoznice (Jičín)
- Rohoznice (Pardubice)
- Rohy (Třebíč)
- Rochlov (Plzeň-North)
- Rochov (Litoměřice)
- Rojetín (Brno-Country)
- Rokle (Chomutov)
- Rokycany (town; Rokycany)
- Rokytá (Mladá Boleslav)
- Rokytňany (Jičín)
- Rokytnice (Přerov)
- Rokytnice (Zlín)
- Rokytnice nad Jizerou (town; Semily)
- Rokytnice nad Rokytnou (market town; Třebíč)
- Rokytnice v Orlických horách (town; Rychnov nad Kněžnou)
- Rokytno (Pardubice)
- Rokytovec (Mladá Boleslav)
- Ronov nad Doubravou (town; Chrudim)
- Ropice (Frýdek-Místek)
- Roprachtice (Semily)
- Roseč (Jindřichův Hradec)
- Rosice (town; Brno-Country)
- Rosice (Chrudim)
- Rosička (Jindřichův Hradec)
- Rosička (Žďár nad Sázavou)
- Rosovice (Příbram)
- Rostěnice-Zvonovice (Vyškov)
- Rostoklaty (Kolín)
- Roštění (Kroměříž)
- Roštín (Kroměříž)
- Rotava (town; Sokolov)
- Roubanina (Blansko)
- Roudná (Tábor)
- Roudné (České Budějovice)
- Roudnice nad Labem (town; Litoměřice)
- Roudnice (Hradec Králové)
- Roudno (Bruntál)
- Rouchovany (Třebíč)
- Roupov (Plzeň-South)
- Rousínov (town; Vyškov)
- Rouské (Přerov)
- Rousměrov (Žďár nad Sázavou)
- Rovečné (Žďár nad Sázavou)
- Rovensko (Šumperk)
- Rovensko pod Troskami (town; Semily)
- Rovná (Pelhřimov)
- Rovná (Sokolov)
- Rovná (Strakonice)
- Rožďalovice (town; Nymburk)
- Rozdrojovice (Brno-Country)
- Rozhovice (Chrudim)
- Rozhraní (Svitavy)
- Rozkoš (Znojmo)
- Rožmberk nad Vltavou (town; Český Krumlov)
- Rožmitál na Šumavě (Český Krumlov)
- Rožmitál pod Třemšínem (town; Příbram)
- Rožná (Žďár nad Sázavou)
- Rožnov pod Radhoštěm (town; Vsetín)
- Rožnov (Náchod)
- Rozseč (Jihlava)
- Rozseč (Žďár nad Sázavou)
- Rozseč nad Kunštátem (Blansko)
- Rozsíčka (Blansko)
- Rozsochatec (Havlíčkův Brod)
- Rozsochy (Žďár nad Sázavou)
- Rozstání (Prostějov)
- Rozstání (Svitavy)
- Roztoky (town; Prague-West)
- Roztoky (Rakovník)
- Roztoky u Jilemnice (Semily)
- Roztoky u Semil (Semily)
- Rozvadov (Tachov)
- Rpety (Beroun)
- Rtyně nad Bílinou (Teplice)
- Rtyně v Podkrkonoší (town; Trutnov)
- Ruda (Rakovník)
- Ruda (Žďár nad Sázavou)
- Ruda nad Moravou (Šumperk)
- Rudice (Blansko)
- Rudice (Uherské Hradiště)
- Rudíkov (Třebíč)
- Rudimov (Zlín)
- Rudka (Brno-Country)
- Rudlice (Znojmo)
- Rudná (town; Prague-West)
- Rudná (Svitavy)
- Rudná pod Pradědem (Bruntál)
- Rudník (Trutnov)
- Rudolec (Žďár nad Sázavou)
- Rudolfov (town; České Budějovice)
- Rudoltice (Ústí nad Orlicí)
- Rumburk (town; Děčín)
- Ruprechtov (Vyškov)
- Rusava (Kroměříž)
- Rusín (Bruntál)
- Rušinov (Havlíčkův Brod)
- Růžďka (Vsetín)
- Růžená (Jihlava)
- Růžová (Děčín)
- Rybí (Nový Jičín)
- Rybitví (Pardubice)
- Rybná nad Zdobnicí (Rychnov nad Kněžnou)
- Rybné (Jihlava)
- Rybnice (Plzeň-North)
- Rybníček (Havlíčkův Brod)
- Rybníček (Vyškov)
- Rybník (Domažlice)
- Rybník (Ústí nad Orlicí)
- Rybníky (Příbram)
- Rybníky (Znojmo)
- Rybniště (Děčín)
- Rychnov na Moravě (Svitavy)
- Rychnov nad Kněžnou (town; Rychnov nad Kněžnou)
- Rychnov u Jablonce nad Nisou (town; Jablonec nad Nisou)
- Rychnovek (Náchod)
- Rychvald (town; Karviná)
- Ryjice (Ústí nad Labem)
- Rýmařov (town; Bruntál)
- Rymice (Kroměříž)
- Rynárec (Pelhřimov)
- Rynholec (Rakovník)
- Rynoltice (Liberec)
- Ryžoviště (Bruntál)

== S ==
- Šabina (Sokolov)
- Sádek (Příbram)
- Sádek (Svitavy)
- Sadov (Karlovy Vary)
- Sadová (Hradec Králové)
- Sadská (town; Nymburk)
- Šafov (Znojmo)
- Šakvice (Břeclav)
- Salačova Lhota (Pelhřimov)
- Salaš (Uherské Hradiště)
- Samopše (Kutná Hora)
- Samotišky (Olomouc)
- Samšín (Pelhřimov)
- Samšina (Jičín)
- Šanov (Rakovník)
- Šanov (Zlín)
- Šanov (Znojmo)
- Sány (Nymburk)
- Šaplava (Hradec Králové)
- Šaratice (Vyškov)
- Šardice (Hodonín)
- Šárovcova Lhota (Jičín)
- Šarovy (Zlín)
- Šatov (market town; Znojmo)
- Sázava (town; Benešov)
- Sázava (Ústí nad Orlicí)
- Sázava (Žďár nad Sázavou)
- Sázavka (Havlíčkův Brod)
- Sazená (Kladno)
- Sazomín (Žďár nad Sázavou)
- Sazovice (Zlín)
- Sběř (Jičín)
- Schořov (Kutná Hora)
- Sebečice (Rokycany)
- Šebestěnice (Kutná Hora)
- Šebetov (Blansko)
- Šebířov (Tábor)
- Šebkovice (Třebíč)
- Sebranice (Blansko)
- Sebranice (Svitavy)
- Šebrov-Kateřina (Blansko)
- Seč (town; Chrudim)
- Seč (Plzeň-South)
- Seč (Ústí nad Orlicí)
- Šedivec (Ústí nad Orlicí)
- Sedlatice (Jihlava)
- Sedlčany (town; Příbram)
- Sedlec-Prčice (town; Benešov)
- Sedlec (Břeclav)
- Sedlec (České Budějovice)
- Sedlec (Litoměřice)
- Sedlec (Mladá Boleslav)
- Sedlec (Plzeň-North)
- Sedlec (Prague-East)
- Sedlec (Třebíč)
- Sedlečko u Soběslavě (Tábor)
- Sedlejov (Jihlava)
- Sedletín (Havlíčkův Brod)
- Sedlice (Pelhřimov)
- Sedlice (Příbram)
- Sedlice (town; Strakonice)
- Sedliště (Frýdek-Místek)
- Sedliště (Jičín)
- Sedliště (Plzeň-South)
- Sedliště (Svitavy)
- Sedlnice (Nový Jičín)
- Sedloňov (Rychnov nad Kněžnou)
- Sehradice (Zlín)
- Sejřek (Žďár nad Sázavou)
- Sekeřice (Jičín)
- Šelešovice (Kroměříž)
- Seletice (Nymburk)
- Selmice (Pardubice)
- Seloutky (Prostějov)
- Semanín (Ústí nad Orlicí)
- Semčice (Mladá Boleslav)
- Semechnice (Rychnov nad Kněžnou)
- Semice (Nymburk)
- Semily (town; Semily)
- Semín (Pardubice)
- Semněvice (Domažlice)
- Šemnice (Karlovy Vary)
- Semtěš (Kutná Hora)
- Sendraž (Náchod)
- Sendražice (Hradec Králové)
- Senec (Rakovník)
- Senetářov (Blansko)
- Senice na Hané (Olomouc)
- Senice (Nymburk)
- Senička (Olomouc)
- Seninka (Vsetín)
- Senohraby (Prague-East)
- Senomaty (market town; Rakovník)
- Senorady (Brno-Country)
- Šenov (town; Ostrava-City)
- Šenov u Nového Jičína (Nový Jičín)
- Senožaty (Pelhřimov)
- Sentice (Brno-Country)
- Sepekov (market town; Písek)
- Šerkovice (Brno-Country)
- Šestajovice (Náchod)
- Šestajovice (Prague-East)
- Šetějovice (Benešov)
- Ševětín (market town; České Budějovice)
- Sezemice (Mladá Boleslav)
- Sezemice (town; Pardubice)
- Sezimovo Ústí (town; Tábor)
- Sibřina (Prague-East)
- Šilheřovice (Opava)
- Silůvky (Brno-Country)
- Šimanov (Jihlava)
- Šimonovice (Liberec)
- Šindelová (Sokolov)
- Šípy (Rakovník)
- Sirá (Rokycany)
- Sirákov (Žďár nad Sázavou)
- Siřejovice (Litoměřice)
- Široká Niva (Bruntál)
- Široký Důl (Svitavy)
- Šišma (Přerov)
- Šitbořice (Břeclav)
- Sivice (Brno-Country)
- Skalice (Hradec Králové)
- Skalice (Tábor)
- Skalice (Znojmo)
- Skalice nad Svitavou (Blansko)
- Skalice u České Lípy (Česká Lípa)
- Skalička (Brno-Country)
- Skalička (Přerov)
- Skalka (Hodonín)
- Skalka (Prostějov)
- Skalka u Doks (Česká Lípa)
- Skalná (town; Cheb)
- Skalsko (Mladá Boleslav)
- Skály (Písek)
- Skály (Strakonice)
- Skapce (Tachov)
- Skašov (Plzeň-South)
- Skaštice (Kroměříž)
- Sklené (Svitavy)
- Sklené (Žďár nad Sázavou)
- Sklené nad Oslavou (Žďár nad Sázavou)
- Skočice (Strakonice)
- Skomelno (Rokycany)
- Skopytce (Tábor)
- Skorkov (Havlíčkův Brod)
- Skorkov (Mladá Boleslav)
- Skoronice (Hodonín)
- Skorošice (Jeseník)
- Skorotice (Žďár nad Sázavou)
- Skořenice (Ústí nad Orlicí)
- Skořice (Rokycany)
- Skotnice (Nový Jičín)
- Skrbeň (Olomouc)
- Skrchov (Blansko)
- Škrdlovice (Žďár nad Sázavou)
- Skršín (Most)
- Skrýchov u Malšic (Tábor)
- Skryje (Brno-Country)
- Skryje (Havlíčkův Brod)
- Skryje (Rakovník)
- Skřinářov (Žďár nad Sázavou)
- Skřipel (Beroun)
- Skřipov (Opava)
- Skřípov (Prostějov)
- Skřivany (Hradec Králové)
- Skuhrov (Beroun)
- Skuhrov (Havlíčkův Brod)
- Skuhrov (Jablonec nad Nisou)
- Skuhrov nad Bělou (Rychnov nad Kněžnou)
- Skuteč (town; Chrudim)
- Škvorec (market town; Prague-East)
- Škvořetice (Strakonice)
- Skvrňov (Kolín)
- Slabce (market town; Rakovník)
- Slabčice (Písek)
- Slaná (Semily)
- Slaník (Strakonice)
- Slaný (town; Kladno)
- Šlapanice (town; Brno-Country)
- Šlapanice (Kladno)
- Šlapanov (Havlíčkův Brod)
- Slapsko (Tábor)
- Slapy (Prague-West)
- Slapy (Tábor)
- Slatina (Kladno)
- Slatina (Klatovy)
- Slatina (Litoměřice)
- Slatina (Nový Jičín)
- Slatina (Plzeň-North)
- Slatina (Svitavy)
- Slatina (Ústí nad Orlicí)
- Slatina (Znojmo)
- Slatina nad Úpou (Náchod)
- Slatina nad Zdobnicí (Rychnov nad Kněžnou)
- Slatiňany (town; Chrudim)
- Slatinice (Olomouc)
- Slatinky (Prostějov)
- Slatiny (Jičín)
- Slavče (České Budějovice)
- Slavětice (Třebíč)
- Slavětín (Havlíčkův Brod)
- Slavětín (market town; Louny)
- Slavětín (Olomouc)
- Slavětín nad Metují (Náchod)
- Slavhostice (Jičín)
- Slavičín (town; Zlín)
- Slavičky (Třebíč)
- Slavíkov (Havlíčkův Brod)
- Slavíkovice (Třebíč)
- Slavkov (Opava)
- Slavkov (Uherské Hradiště)
- Slavkov pod Hostýnem (Kroměříž)
- Slavkov u Brna (town; Vyškov)
- Slavníč (Havlíčkův Brod)
- Slavonice (town; Jindřichův Hradec)
- Slavoňov (Náchod)
- Slavošov (Kutná Hora)
- Šléglov (Šumperk)
- Slepotice (Pardubice)
- Slezské Pavlovice (Bruntál)
- Slezské Rudoltice (Bruntál)
- Slopné (Zlín)
- Sloup v Čechách (Česká Lípa)
- Sloup (market town; Blansko)
- Sloupnice (Ústí nad Orlicí)
- Sloupno (Havlíčkův Brod)
- Sloupno (Hradec Králové)
- Sloveč (Nymburk)
- Slověnice (Benešov)
- Sluhy (Prague-East)
- Šluknov (town; Děčín)
- Slunečná (Česká Lípa)
- Slup (Znojmo)
- Slušovice (town; Zlín)
- Sluštice (Prague-East)
- Služátky (Havlíčkův Brod)
- Služovice (Opava)
- Smečno (town; Kladno)
- Smědčice (Rokycany)
- Smetanova Lhota (Písek)
- Smidary (Hradec Králové)
- Smilkov (Benešov)
- Smilovice (Frýdek-Místek)
- Smilovice (Mladá Boleslav)
- Smilovice (Rakovník)
- Smilovy Hory (Tábor)
- Smiřice (town; Hradec Králové)
- Smolné Pece (Karlovy Vary)
- Smolnice (Louny)
- Smolotely (Příbram)
- Smrček (Chrudim)
- Smrčná (Jihlava)
- Smrk (Třebíč)
- Smržice (Prostějov)
- Smržov (Hradec Králové)
- Smržov (Jindřichův Hradec)
- Smržovka (town; Jablonec nad Nisou)
- Snědovice (Litoměřice)
- Snět (Benešov)
- Sněžné (Rychnov nad Kněžnou)
- Sněžné (market town; Žďár nad Sázavou)
- Snovídky (Vyškov)
- Sobčice (Jičín)
- Soběchleby (Přerov)
- Soběhrdy (Benešov)
- Soběkury (Plzeň-South)
- Soběnov (Český Krumlov)
- Soběraz (Jičín)
- Soběslav (town; Tábor)
- Soběslavice (Liberec)
- Soběsuky (Kroměříž)
- Soběšice (Klatovy)
- Soběšín (Kutná Hora)
- Soběšovice (Frýdek-Místek)
- Sobětuchy (Chrudim)
- Sobíňov (Havlíčkův Brod)
- Sobíšky (Přerov)
- Sobkovice (Ústí nad Orlicí)
- Sobotín (Šumperk)
- Sobotka (town; Jičín)
- Sobotovice (Brno-Country)
- Sobůlky (Hodonín)
- Sojovice (Mladá Boleslav)
- Sokoleč (Nymburk)
- Sokolnice (Brno-Country)
- Sokolov (town; Sokolov)
- Solenice (Příbram)
- Solnice (town; Rychnov nad Kněžnou)
- Šonov (Náchod)
- Sopotnice (Ústí nad Orlicí)
- Sopřeč (Pardubice)
- Sosnová (Česká Lípa)
- Sosnová (Opava)
- Šošůvka (Blansko)
- Souňov (Kutná Hora)
- Sousedovice (Strakonice)
- Soutice (Benešov)
- Sovětice (Hradec Králové)
- Sovínky (market town; Mladá Boleslav)
- Sovolusky (Pardubice)
- Spálené Poříčí (town; Plzeň-South)
- Spálov (market town; Nový Jičín)
- Spáňov (Domažlice)
- Spělkov (Žďár nad Sázavou)
- Spešov (Blansko)
- Špičky (Přerov)
- Špindlerův Mlýn (town; Trutnov)
- Spojil (Pardubice)
- Spomyšl (Mělník)
- Spořice (Chomutov)
- Spytihněv (Zlín)
- Srbce (Prostějov)
- Srbeč (Rakovník)
- Srbice (Domažlice)
- Srbice (Teplice)
- Srbská Kamenice (Děčín)
- Srbsko (Beroun)
- Srby (Domažlice)
- Srby (Plzeň-South)
- Srch (Pardubice)
- Srní (Klatovy)
- Srnín (Český Krumlov)
- Srnojedy (Pardubice)
- Srubec (České Budějovice)
- Sruby (Ústí nad Orlicí)
- Štáblovice (Opava)
- Stachy (Prachatice)
- Stádlec (market town; Tábor)
- Šťáhlavy (Plzeň-City)
- Stáj (Jihlava)
- Stálky (Znojmo)
- Staňkov (town; Domažlice)
- Staňkov (Jindřichův Hradec)
- Staňkovice (Kutná Hora)
- Staňkovice (Litoměřice)
- Staňkovice (Louny)
- Stanovice (Karlovy Vary)
- Stanovice (Trutnov)
- Stanoviště (Brno-Country)
- Stará Červená Voda (Jeseník)
- Stará Huť (Příbram)
- Stará Lysá (Nymburk)
- Stará Paka (Jičín)
- Stará Říše (market town; Jihlava)
- Stará Ves (Bruntál)
- Stará Ves (Přerov)
- Stará Ves nad Ondřejnicí (Ostrava-City)
- Stará Voda (Cheb)
- Stará Voda (Hradec Králové)
- Staré Bříště (Pelhřimov)
- Staré Buky (Trutnov)
- Staré Hamry (Frýdek-Místek)
- Staré Heřminovy (Bruntál)
- Staré Hobzí (Jindřichův Hradec)
- Staré Hodějovice (České Budějovice)
- Staré Hradiště (Pardubice)
- Staré Hrady (Jičín)
- Staré Hutě (Uherské Hradiště)
- Staré Jesenčany (Pardubice)
- Staré Křečany (Děčín)
- Staré Město (Bruntál)
- Staré Město (Frýdek-Místek)
- Staré Město (Svitavy)
- Staré Město (town; Šumperk)
- Staré Město (town; Uherské Hradiště)
- Staré Město pod Landštejnem (market town; Jindřichův Hradec)
- Staré Místo (Jičín)
- Staré Sedliště (Tachov)
- Staré Sedlo (Sokolov)
- Staré Sedlo (Tachov)
- Staré Smrkovice (Jičín)
- Staré Těchanovice (Opava)
- Staré Ždánice (Pardubice)
- Stařeč (market town; Třebíč)
- Stařechovice (Prostějov)
- Staříč (Frýdek-Místek)
- Starkoč (Kutná Hora)
- Stárkov (town; Náchod)
- Štarnov (Olomouc)
- Starosedlský Hrádek (Příbram)
- Starovice (Břeclav)
- Starovičky (Břeclav)
- Starý Bydžov (Hradec Králové)
- Starý Hrozenkov (Uherské Hradiště)
- Starý Jičín (Nový Jičín)
- Starý Kolín (Kolín)
- Starý Mateřov (Pardubice)
- Starý Petřín (Znojmo)
- Starý Plzenec (town; Plzeň-City)
- Starý Poddvorov (Hodonín)
- Starý Šachov (Děčín)
- Starý Vestec (Nymburk)
- Stašov (Beroun)
- Stašov (Svitavy)
- Statenice (Prague-West)
- Stavenice (Šumperk)
- Stavěšice (Hodonín)
- Stéblová (Pardubice)
- Stebno (Ústí nad Labem)
- Stěbořice (Opava)
- Štěchov (Blansko)
- Štěchovice (market town; Prague-West)
- Štěchovice (Strakonice)
- Štědrá (Karlovy Vary)
- Stehelčeves (Kladno)
- Stehlovice (Písek)
- Štěkeň (market town; Strakonice)
- Štěměchy (Třebíč)
- Štěnovice (Plzeň-South)
- Štěnovický Borek (Plzeň-City)
- Štěpánkovice (Opava)
- Štěpánov (town; Olomouc)
- Štěpánov nad Svratkou (market town; Žďár nad Sázavou)
- Štěpánovice (Brno-Country)
- Štěpánovice (České Budějovice)
- Štěpkov (Třebíč)
- Šternberk (town; Olomouc)
- Štětí (town; Litoměřice)
- Štětkovice (Příbram)
- Stěžery (Hradec Králové)
- Štichov (Plzeň-North)
- Štichovice (Plzeň-North)
- Štíhlice (Kolín)
- Stínava (Prostějov)
- Štipoklasy (Kutná Hora)
- Štítary (market town; Znojmo)
- Štítina (Opava)
- Štítná nad Vláří-Popov (Zlín)
- Štítov (Rokycany)
- Štíty (town; Šumperk)
- Stochov (town; Kladno)
- Stod (town; Plzeň-South)
- Stojčín (Pelhřimov)
- Stojice (Pardubice)
- Štoky (market town; Havlíčkův Brod)
- Stolany (Chrudim)
- Stonařov (market town; Jihlava)
- Stonava (Karviná)
- Stošíkovice na Louce (Znojmo)
- Stožec (Prachatice)
- Stožice (Strakonice)
- Stračov (Hradec Králové)
- Stradonice (Kladno)
- Stradouň (Ústí nad Orlicí)
- Strahovice (Opava)
- Strachoňovice (Jihlava)
- Strachotice (Znojmo)
- Strachotín (Břeclav)
- Strachujov (Žďár nad Sázavou)
- Strakonice (town; Strakonice)
- Strakov (Svitavy)
- Straky (Nymburk)
- Štramberk (town; Nový Jičín)
- Strančice (Prague-East)
- Stránecká Zhoř (Žďár nad Sázavou)
- Strání (Uherské Hradiště)
- Stránka (Mělník)
- Stranný (Benešov)
- Strašice (Rokycany)
- Strašice (Strakonice)
- Strašín (Klatovy)
- Straškov-Vodochody (Litoměřice)
- Strašnov (Mladá Boleslav)
- Strašov (Pardubice)
- Stratov (Nymburk)
- Stráž (Domažlice)
- Stráž (market town; Tachov)
- Stráž nad Nežárkou (town; Jindřichův Hradec)
- Stráž nad Nisou (Liberec)
- Stráž nad Ohří (Karlovy Vary)
- Stráž pod Ralskem (town; Česká Lípa)
- Strážek (market town; Žďár nad Sázavou)
- Stražisko (Prostějov)
- Strážiště (Mladá Boleslav)
- Strážkovice (České Budějovice)
- Strážná (Ústí nad Orlicí)
- Strážné (Trutnov)
- Strážnice (town; Hodonín)
- Strážný (market town; Prachatice)
- Strážov (town; Klatovy)
- Strážovice (Hodonín)
- Středokluky (Prague-West)
- Střelice (Brno-Country)
- Střelice (Plzeň-South)
- Střelice (Znojmo)
- Střelná (Vsetín)
- Střelské Hoštice (Strakonice)
- Střemošice (Chrudim)
- Střemy (Mělník)
- Střeň (Olomouc)
- Strenice (Mladá Boleslav)
- Střevač (Jičín)
- Střezetice (Hradec Králové)
- Střezimíř (Benešov)
- Strhaře (Brno-Country)
- Stříbrná Skalice (Kolín)
- Stříbrná (Sokolov)
- Stříbrné Hory (Havlíčkův Brod)
- Stříbrnice (Přerov)
- Stříbrnice (Uherské Hradiště)
- Stříbro (town; Tachov)
- Stříbřec (Jindřichův Hradec)
- Střílky (Kroměříž)
- Střítež (Český Krumlov)
- Střítež (Frýdek-Místek)
- Střítež (Jihlava)
- Střítež (Pelhřimov)
- Střítež (Třebíč)
- Střítež (Žďár nad Sázavou)
- Střítež nad Bečvou (Vsetín)
- Střítež nad Ludinou (Přerov)
- Střítež pod Křemešníkem (Pelhřimov)
- Střížov (České Budějovice)
- Střížovice (Jindřichův Hradec)
- Střížovice (Kroměříž)
- Střížovice (Plzeň-South)
- Strmilov (town; Jindřichův Hradec)
- Strojetice (Benešov)
- Stropešín (Třebíč)
- Struhařov (Benešov)
- Struhařov (Prague-East)
- Strukov (Olomouc)
- Strunkovice nad Blanicí (market town; Prachatice)
- Strunkovice nad Volyňkou (Strakonice)
- Strupčice (Chomutov)
- Stružinec (Semily)
- Stružná (Karlovy Vary)
- Stružnice (Česká Lípa)
- Strýčice (České Budějovice)
- Studánka (Tachov)
- Studená (Jindřichův Hradec)
- Studená (Plzeň-North)
- Studené (Ústí nad Orlicí)
- Studenec (Semily)
- Studenec (Třebíč)
- Studeněves (Kladno)
- Studénka (town; Nový Jičín)
- Studený (Benešov)
- Študlov (Svitavy)
- Študlov (Zlín)
- Studnice (Chrudim)
- Studnice (Náchod)
- Studnice (Třebíč)
- Studnice (Vyškov)
- Stupava (Uherské Hradiště)
- Stvolínky (Česká Lípa)
- Stvolová (Blansko)
- Šubířov (Prostějov)
- Suchá (Jihlava)
- Suchá Lhota (Svitavy)
- Suchá Loz (Uherské Hradiště)
- Suchdol (market town; Kutná Hora)
- Suchdol (Prostějov)
- Suchdol nad Lužnicí (town; Jindřichův Hradec)
- Suchdol nad Odrou (market town; Nový Jičín)
- Suchodol (Příbram)
- Suchohrdly u Miroslavi (Znojmo)
- Suchohrdly (Znojmo)
- Suchomasty (Beroun)
- Suchonice (Olomouc)
- Suchov (Hodonín)
- Suchovršice (Trutnov)
- Suchý Důl (Náchod)
- Suchý (Blansko)
- Sudějov (Kutná Hora)
- Sudice (Blansko)
- Sudice (Opava)
- Sudice (Třebíč)
- Sudislav nad Orlicí (Ústí nad Orlicí)
- Sudkov (Šumperk)
- Sudoměř (Mladá Boleslav)
- Sudoměřice u Bechyně (Tábor)
- Sudoměřice u Tábora (Tábor)
- Sudoměřice (Hodonín)
- Sudovo Hlavno (Mladá Boleslav)
- Sudslava (Ústí nad Orlicí)
- Sukorady (Jičín)
- Sukorady (Mladá Boleslav)
- Sulejovice (Litoměřice)
- Sulice (Prague-East)
- Sulíkov (Blansko)
- Sulimov (Kroměříž)
- Sulislav (Tachov)
- Sulkovec (Žďár nad Sázavou)
- Šumavské Hoštice (Prachatice)
- Šumice (Brno-Country)
- Šumice (Uherské Hradiště)
- Šumná (Znojmo)
- Šumperk (town; Šumperk)
- Šumvald (Olomouc)
- Supíkovice (Jeseník)
- Sušice (town; Klatovy)
- Sušice (Přerov)
- Sušice (Uherské Hradiště)
- Švábenice (market town; Vyškov)
- Švábov (Jihlava)
- Svárov (Kladno)
- Svárov (Uherské Hradiště)
- Svatá Maří (Prachatice)
- Svatá (Beroun)
- Svatava (market town; Sokolov)
- Svaté Pole (Příbram)
- Svatobořice-Mistřín (Hodonín)
- Svatojanský Újezd (Jičín)
- Svatoňovice (Opava)
- Svatoslav (Brno-Country)
- Svatoslav (Třebíč)
- Svatý Jan nad Malší (České Budějovice)
- Svatý Jan pod Skalou (Beroun)
- Svatý Jan (Příbram)
- Svatý Jiří (Ústí nad Orlicí)
- Svatý Mikuláš (Kutná Hora)
- Svébohov (Šumperk)
- Svémyslice (Prague-East)
- Svépravice (Pelhřimov)
- Svéradice (Klatovy)
- Svésedlice (Olomouc)
- Světce (Jindřichův Hradec)
- Světec (Teplice)
- Světí (Hradec Králové)
- Světice (Prague-East)
- Světlá (Blansko)
- Světlá Hora (Bruntál)
- Světlá nad Sázavou (town; Havlíčkův Brod)
- Světlá pod Ještědem (Liberec)
- Světlík (Český Krumlov)
- Světnov (Žďár nad Sázavou)
- Sviadnov (Frýdek-Místek)
- Svídnice (Chrudim)
- Svídnice (Rychnov nad Kněžnou)
- Švihov (town; Klatovy)
- Švihov (Rakovník)
- Svijanský Újezd (Liberec)
- Svijany (Liberec)
- Svinaře (Beroun)
- Svinařov (Kladno)
- Svinčany (Pardubice)
- Svinošice (Blansko)
- Sviny (Tábor)
- Sviny (Žďár nad Sázavou)
- Svitávka (market town; Blansko)
- Svitavy (town; Svitavy)
- Svoboda nad Úpou (town; Trutnov)
- Svobodné Heřmanice (Bruntál)
- Svojanov (market town; Svitavy)
- Svojek (Semily)
- Svojetice (Prague-East)
- Svojetín (Rakovník)
- Svojkov (Česká Lípa)
- Svojkovice (Jihlava)
- Svojkovice (Rokycany)
- Svojšice (Kolín)
- Svojšice (Pardubice)
- Svojšice (Příbram)
- Svojšín (Tachov)
- Svor (Česká Lípa)
- Svrabov (Tábor)
- Svratka (town; Žďár nad Sázavou)
- Svratouch (Chrudim)
- Svrkyně (Prague-West)
- Sychrov (Liberec)
- Sýkořice (Rakovník)
- Synalov (Brno-Country)
- Synkov-Slemeno (Rychnov nad Kněžnou)
- Syrov (Pelhřimov)
- Syrovátka (Hradec Králové)
- Syrovice (Brno-Country)
- Syrovín (Hodonín)
- Syřenov (Semily)
- Sytno (Tachov)

== T ==
- Tábor (town; Tábor)
- Tachlovice (Prague-West)
- Tachov (Česká Lípa)
- Tachov (town; Tachov)
- Tálín (Písek)
- Tanvald (town; Jablonec nad Nisou)
- Tasov (Hodonín)
- Tašov (Ústí nad Labem)
- Tasov (Žďár nad Sázavou)
- Tasovice (Blansko)
- Tasovice (Znojmo)
- Tatce (Nymburk)
- Tatenice (Ústí nad Orlicí)
- Tatiná (Plzeň-North)
- Tatobity (Semily)
- Tatrovice (Sokolov)
- Tavíkovice (Znojmo)
- Tečovice (Zlín)
- Tehov (Benešov)
- Tehov (Prague-East)
- Tehovec (Prague-East)
- Těchařovice (Příbram)
- Těchlovice (Děčín)
- Těchlovice (Hradec Králové)
- Těchobuz (Pelhřimov)
- Těchonín (Ústí nad Orlicí)
- Telč (town; Jihlava)
- Telecí (Svitavy)
- Telnice (Brno-Country)
- Telnice (Ústí nad Labem)
- Temelín (České Budějovice)
- Temešvár (Písek)
- Těmice (Hodonín)
- Těmice (Pelhřimov)
- Těně (Rokycany)
- Teplá (town; Karlovy Vary)
- Teplice nad Bečvou (Přerov)
- Teplice nad Metují (town; Náchod)
- Teplice (city; Teplice)
- Teplička (Karlovy Vary)
- Teplýšovice (Benešov)
- Terešov (Rokycany)
- Terezín (Hodonín)
- Terezín (town; Litoměřice)
- Těrlicko (Karviná)
- Těšany (Brno-Country)
- Těšetice (Olomouc)
- Těšetice (Znojmo)
- Těškov (Rokycany)
- Těškovice (Opava)
- Těšovice (Prachatice)
- Těšovice (Sokolov)
- Tetčice (Brno-Country)
- Tetín (Beroun)
- Tetín (Jičín)
- Tetov (Pardubice)
- Tchořovice (Strakonice)
- Tichá (Nový Jičín)
- Tichonice (Benešov)
- Tichov (Zlín)
- Tis u Blatna (Plzeň-North)
- Tis (Havlíčkův Brod)
- Tisá (Ústí nad Labem)
- Tísek (Nový Jičín)
- Tisem (Benešov)
- Tismice (Kolín)
- Tisová (Tachov)
- Tisová (Ústí nad Orlicí)
- Tisovec (Chrudim)
- Tišice (Mělník)
- Tišnov (town; Brno-Country)
- Tišnovská Nová Ves (Brno-Country)
- Tištín (market town; Prostějov)
- Tlučná (Plzeň-North)
- Tlumačov (Domažlice)
- Tlumačov (Zlín)
- Tlustice (Beroun)
- Tmaň (Beroun)
- Točník (Beroun)
- Tochovice (Příbram)
- Tojice (Plzeň-South)
- Tomice (Benešov)
- Topolany (Vyškov)
- Topolná (Uherské Hradiště)
- Toušice (Kolín)
- Toužetín (Louny)
- Toužim (town; Karlovy Vary)
- Tovačov (town; Přerov)
- Tovéř (Olomouc)
- Třanovice (Frýdek-Místek)
- Traplice (Uherské Hradiště)
- Travčice (Litoměřice)
- Trboušany (Brno-Country)
- Třebařov (Svitavy)
- Třebčice (Plzeň-South)
- Třebechovice pod Orebem (town; Hradec Králové)
- Třebějice (Tábor)
- Třebelovice (Třebíč)
- Třebeň (Cheb)
- Třebenice (town; Litoměřice)
- Třebenice (Třebíč)
- Třebestovice (Nymburk)
- Třebešice (Benešov)
- Třebešice (Kutná Hora)
- Třebešov (Rychnov nad Kněžnou)
- Třebětice (Jindřichův Hradec)
- Třebětice (Kroměříž)
- Třebětín (Kutná Hora)
- Třebíč (town; Třebíč)
- Třebihošť (Trutnov)
- Třebichovice (Kladno)
- Třebívlice (Litoměřice)
- Třebíz (Kladno)
- Třebnouševes (Jičín)
- Třeboc (Rakovník)
- Třebohostice (Strakonice)
- Třebom (Opava)
- Třeboň (town; Jindřichův Hradec)
- Třebonín (Kutná Hora)
- Třebosice (Pardubice)
- Třebotov (Prague-West)
- Třebovice (Ústí nad Orlicí)
- Třebovle (Kolín)
- Třebsko (Příbram)
- Třebusice (Kladno)
- Třebušín (Litoměřice)
- Třemešná (Bruntál)
- Třemešné (Tachov)
- Třemošná (town; Plzeň-North)
- Třemošnice (town; Chrudim)
- Třesov (Třebíč)
- Třesovice (Hradec Králové)
- Třešovice (Strakonice)
- Třešť (town; Jihlava)
- Třeštice (Jihlava)
- Třeština (Šumperk)
- Trhanov (Domažlice)
- Trhová Kamenice (market town; Chrudim)
- Trhové Dušníky (Příbram)
- Trhové Sviny (town; České Budějovice)
- Trhový Štěpánov (town; Benešov)
- Tři Dvory (Kolín)
- Tři Sekery (Cheb)
- Tři Studně (Žďár nad Sázavou)
- Třibřichy (Chrudim)
- Třinec (city; Frýdek-Místek)
- Trmice (town; Ústí nad Labem)
- Trnava (Třebíč)
- Trnava (Zlín)
- Trnávka (Nový Jičín)
- Trnávka (Pardubice)
- Trnov (Rychnov nad Kněžnou)
- Trnová (Plzeň-North)
- Trnová (Prague-West)
- Trnovany (Litoměřice)
- Trnové Pole (Znojmo)
- Trojanovice (Nový Jičín)
- Trojovice (Chrudim)
- Trokavec (Rokycany)
- Troskotovice (market town; Brno-Country)
- Troskovice (Semily)
- Trotina (Trutnov)
- Troubelice (Olomouc)
- Troubky-Zdislavice (Kroměříž)
- Troubky (Přerov)
- Troubsko (Brno-Country)
- Trpík (Ústí nad Orlicí)
- Trpín (Svitavy)
- Trpísty (Tachov)
- Trpišovice (Havlíčkův Brod)
- Tršice (Olomouc)
- Trstěnice (Cheb)
- Trstěnice (Svitavy)
- Trstěnice (Znojmo)
- Třtěnice (Jičín)
- Třtice (Rakovník)
- Trubín (Beroun)
- Trubská (Beroun)
- Truskovice (Strakonice)
- Trusnov (Pardubice)
- Trutnov (town; Trutnov)
- Tržek (Svitavy)
- Tučapy (Tábor)
- Tučapy (Uherské Hradiště)
- Tučapy (Vyškov)
- Tuchlovice (Kladno)
- Tuchoměřice (Prague-West)
- Tuchoraz (Kolín)
- Tuchořice (Louny)
- Tučín (Přerov)
- Tuhaň (Česká Lípa)
- Tuhaň (Mělník)
- Tuklaty (Kolín)
- Tulešice (Znojmo)
- Tuněchody (Chrudim)
- Tupadly (Kutná Hora)
- Tupadly (Mělník)
- Tupesy (Uherské Hradiště)
- Tuř (Jičín)
- Tuřany (Cheb)
- Tuřany (Kladno)
- Tuřice (Mladá Boleslav)
- Turkovice (Pardubice)
- Turnov (town; Semily)
- Turovec (Tábor)
- Turovice (Přerov)
- Tursko (Prague-West)
- Tušovice (Příbram)
- Tutleky (Rychnov nad Kněžnou)
- Tužice (Klatovy)
- Tvarožná (Brno-Country)
- Tvarožná Lhota (Hodonín)
- Tvorovice (Prostějov)
- Tvořihráz (Znojmo)
- Tvrdkov (Bruntál)
- Tvrdonice (Břeclav)
- Tvrzice (Prachatice)
- Týček (Rokycany)
- Tymákov (Plzeň-City)
- Týn nad Bečvou (Přerov)
- Týn nad Vltavou (town; České Budějovice)
- Týnec (Břeclav)
- Týnec (Klatovy)
- Týnec nad Labem (town; Kolín)
- Týnec nad Sázavou (town; Benešov)
- Týniště nad Orlicí (town; Rychnov nad Kněžnou)
- Týniště (Plzeň-South)
- Týnišťko (Pardubice)

== U ==
- Úbislavice (Jičín)
- Ublo (Zlín)
- Úboč (Domažlice)
- Ubušínek (Žďár nad Sázavou)
- Údlice (Chomutov)
- Údrnice (Jičín)
- Uhelná (Jeseník)
- Uhelná Příbram (market town; Havlíčkův Brod)
- Úherce (Louny)
- Úherce (Plzeň-North)
- Uherčice (Břeclav)
- Úherčice (Chrudim)
- Uherčice (Znojmo)
- Uherské Hradiště (town; Uherské Hradiště)
- Uhersko (Pardubice)
- Uherský Brod (town; Uherské Hradiště)
- Uherský Ostroh (town; Uherské Hradiště)
- Úhlejov (Jičín)
- Uhlířov (Opava)
- Uhlířská Lhota (Kolín)
- Uhlířské Janovice (town; Kutná Hora)
- Úholičky (Prague-West)
- Úhonice (Prague-West)
- Úhořilka (Havlíčkův Brod)
- Úhřetice (Chrudim)
- Úhřetická Lhota (Pardubice)
- Uhřice (Blansko)
- Uhřice (Hodonín)
- Uhřice (Kroměříž)
- Uhřice (Vyškov)
- Uhřičice (Přerov)
- Uhřínov (Žďár nad Sázavou)
- Uhy (Kladno)
- Ujčov (Žďár nad Sázavou)
- Újezd (Beroun)
- Újezd (Domažlice)
- Újezd (Olomouc)
- Újezd (Žďár nad Sázavou)
- Újezd (Zlín)
- Újezd (Znojmo)
- Újezd nade Mží (Plzeň-North)
- Újezd pod Troskami (Jičín)
- Újezd u Boskovic (Blansko)
- Újezd u Brna (town; Brno-Country)
- Újezd u Černé Hory (Blansko)
- Újezd u Chocně (Ústí nad Orlicí)
- Újezd u Plánice (Klatovy)
- Újezd u Přelouče (Pardubice)
- Újezd u Rosic (Brno-Country)
- Újezd u Sezemic (Pardubice)
- Újezd u Svatého Kříže (Rokycany)
- Újezd u Tišnova (Brno-Country)
- Újezdec (Jindřichův Hradec)
- Újezdec (Mělník)
- Újezdec (Prachatice)
- Újezdec (Svitavy)
- Újezdec (Uherské Hradiště)
- Újezdeček (Teplice)
- Ujkovice (Mladá Boleslav)
- Úlehle (Strakonice)
- Úlibice (Jičín)
- Úlice (Plzeň-North)
- Úmonín (Kutná Hora)
- Úmyslovice (Nymburk)
- Únanov (Znojmo)
- Unčín (Žďár nad Sázavou)
- Únehle (Tachov)
- Únějovice (Domažlice)
- Úněšov (Plzeň-North)
- Únětice (Plzeň-South)
- Únětice (Prague-West)
- Unhošť (town; Kladno)
- Únice (Strakonice)
- Uničov (town; Olomouc)
- Unín (Brno-Country)
- Unkovice (Brno-Country)
- Úpice (town; Trutnov)
- Úpohlavy (Litoměřice)
- Urbanice (Hradec Králové)
- Urbanice (Pardubice)
- Urbanov (Jihlava)
- Určice (Prostějov)
- Úsilné (České Budějovice)
- Úsilov (Domažlice)
- Úsobí (market town; Havlíčkův Brod)
- Úsobrno (Blansko)
- Úsov (town; Šumperk)
- Úštěk (town; Litoměřice)
- Ústí (Jihlava)
- Ústí (Přerov)
- Ústí (Vsetín)
- Ústí nad Labem (city; Ústí nad Labem)
- Ústí nad Orlicí (town; Ústí nad Orlicí)
- Ústín (Olomouc)
- Ústrašice (Tábor)
- Ústrašín (Pelhřimov)
- Ústup (Blansko)
- Úsuší (Brno-Country)
- Útěchov (Svitavy)
- Útěchovice pod Stražištěm (Pelhřimov)
- Útěchovice (Pelhřimov)
- Útěchovičky (Pelhřimov)
- Úterý (town; Plzeň-North)
- Útušice (Plzeň-South)
- Útvina (Karlovy Vary)
- Úvalno (Bruntál)
- Úvaly (town; Prague-East)
- Uzenice (Strakonice)
- Uzeničky (Strakonice)
- Úžice (Kutná Hora)
- Úžice (Mělník)

== V ==
- Vacenovice (Hodonín)
- Václavice (Benešov)
- Václavov u Bruntálu (Bruntál)
- Václavovice (Ostrava-City)
- Václavy (Rakovník)
- Vacov (Prachatice)
- Vacovice (Strakonice)
- Val (Rychnov nad Kněžnou)
- Val (Tábor)
- Valašská Bystřice (Vsetín)
- Valašská Polanka (Vsetín)
- Valašská Senice (Vsetín)
- Valašské Klobouky (town; Zlín)
- Valašské Meziříčí (town; Vsetín)
- Valašské Příkazy (Zlín)
- Valdice (Jičín)
- Valdíkov (Třebíč)
- Valeč (Karlovy Vary)
- Valeč (Třebíč)
- Valchov (Blansko)
- Valkeřice (Děčín)
- Valšov (Bruntál)
- Valtice (town; Břeclav)
- Valtrovice (Znojmo)
- Valy (Cheb)
- Valy (Pardubice)
- Vamberk (town; Rychnov nad Kněžnou)
- Vanov (Jihlava)
- Vanovice (Blansko)
- Vanůvek (Jihlava)
- Vápenice (Uherské Hradiště)
- Vápenná (Jeseník)
- Vápenný Podol (Chrudim)
- Vápno (Pardubice)
- Vápovice (Jihlava)
- Varnsdorf (town; Děčín)
- Varvažov (Písek)
- Vatín (Žďár nad Sázavou)
- Vavřinec (Blansko)
- Vavřinec (Kutná Hora)
- Vážany (Blansko)
- Vážany (Uherské Hradiště)
- Vážany (Vyškov)
- Vážany nad Litavou (Vyškov)
- Včelákov (market town; Chrudim)
- Včelná (České Budějovice)
- Včelnička (Pelhřimov)
- Věcov (Žďár nad Sázavou)
- Vědomice (Litoměřice)
- Vedrovice (Znojmo)
- Věchnov (Žďár nad Sázavou)
- Vejprnice (Plzeň-North)
- Vejprty (town; Chomutov)
- Vejvanov (Rokycany)
- Vejvanovice (Chrudim)
- Velatice (Brno-Country)
- Velečín (Plzeň-North)
- Velehrad (Uherské Hradiště)
- Velemín (Litoměřice)
- Velemyšleves (Louny)
- Veleň (Prague-East)
- Velenice (Česká Lípa)
- Velenice (Nymburk)
- Velenka (Nymburk)
- Velenov (Blansko)
- Velešín (town; Český Krumlov)
- Velešovice (Vyškov)
- Veletiny (Uherské Hradiště)
- Veletov (Kolín)
- Velhartice (Klatovy)
- Velichov (Karlovy Vary)
- Velichovky (Náchod)
- Veliká Ves (Chomutov)
- Veliká Ves (Prague-East)
- Velim (Kolín)
- Veliny (Pardubice)
- Veliš (Benešov)
- Veliš (Jičín)
- Velká Bíteš (town; Žďár nad Sázavou)
- Velká Buková (Rakovník)
- Velká Bukovina (Děčín)
- Velká Bystřice (town; Olomouc)
- Velká Dobrá (Kladno)
- Velká Hleďsebe (Cheb)
- Velká Chmelištná (Rakovník)
- Velká Chyška (Pelhřimov)
- Velká Jesenice (Náchod)
- Velká Kraš (Jeseník)
- Velká Lečice (Příbram)
- Velká Lhota (Vsetín)
- Velká Losenice (Žďár nad Sázavou)
- Velká nad Veličkou (Hodonín)
- Velká Polom (Ostrava-City)
- Velká Skrovnice (Ústí nad Orlicí)
- Velká Štáhle (Bruntál)
- Velká Turná (Strakonice)
- Velké Albrechtice (Nový Jičín)
- Velké Bílovice (town; Břeclav)
- Velké Březno (Ústí nad Labem)
- Velké Hamry (town; Jablonec nad Nisou)
- Velké Heraltice (Opava)
- Velké Hostěrádky (Břeclav)
- Velké Hoštice (Opava)
- Velké Hydčice (Klatovy)
- Velké Chvojno (Ústí nad Labem)
- Velké Janovice (Žďár nad Sázavou)
- Velké Karlovice (Vsetín)
- Velké Kunětice (Jeseník)
- Velké Losiny (Šumperk)
- Velké Meziříčí (town; Žďár nad Sázavou)
- Velké Němčice (market town; Břeclav)
- Velké Opatovice (town; Blansko)
- Velké Pavlovice (town; Břeclav)
- Velké Petrovice (Náchod)
- Velké Popovice (Prague-East)
- Velké Poříčí (market town; Náchod)
- Velké Přílepy (Prague-West)
- Velké Přítočno (Kladno)
- Velké Svatoňovice (Trutnov)
- Velké Tresné (Žďár nad Sázavou)
- Velké Všelisy (Mladá Boleslav)
- Velké Žernoseky (Litoměřice)
- Velký Beranov (Jihlava)
- Velký Bor (Klatovy)
- Velký Borek (Mělník)
- Velký Chlumec (Beroun)
- Velký Karlov (Znojmo)
- Velký Luh (Cheb)
- Velký Malahov (Domažlice)
- Velký Ořechov (Zlín)
- Velký Osek (Kolín)
- Velký Ratmírov (Jindřichův Hradec)
- Velký Rybník (Pelhřimov)
- Velký Šenov (town; Děčín)
- Velký Třebešov (Náchod)
- Velký Týnec (Olomouc)
- Velký Újezd (market town; Olomouc)
- Velký Valtinov (Česká Lípa)
- Velký Vřešťov (market town; Trutnov)
- Vělopolí (Frýdek-Místek)
- Veltěže (Louny)
- Veltruby (Kolín)
- Veltrusy (town; Mělník)
- Velvary (town; Kladno)
- Vémyslice (market town; Znojmo)
- Vendolí (Svitavy)
- Vendryně (Frýdek-Místek)
- Vepříkov (Havlíčkův Brod)
- Vepřová (Žďár nad Sázavou)
- Verměřovice (Ústí nad Orlicí)
- Verneřice (town; Děčín)
- Vernéřovice (Náchod)
- Vernířovice (Šumperk)
- Věrovany (Olomouc)
- Verušičky (Karlovy Vary)
- Veřovice (Nový Jičín)
- Ves Touškov (Plzeň-South)
- Vesce (Tábor)
- Veselá (Pelhřimov)
- Veselá (Rokycany)
- Veselá (Semily)
- Veselá (Zlín)
- Veselé (Děčín)
- Veselí nad Lužnicí (town; Tábor)
- Veselí nad Moravou (town; Hodonín)
- Veselí (Pardubice)
- Veselice (Mladá Boleslav)
- Veselíčko (Písek)
- Veselíčko (Přerov)
- Veselý Žďár (Havlíčkův Brod)
- Vestec (Náchod)
- Vestec (Nymburk)
- Vestec (Prague-West)
- Věstín (Žďár nad Sázavou)
- Věšín (Příbram)
- Věteřov (Hodonín)
- Větrný Jeníkov (market town; Jihlava)
- Větrušice (Prague-East)
- Větřkovice (Opava)
- Větřní (town; Český Krumlov)
- Vevčice (Znojmo)
- Veverská Bítýška (town; Brno-Country)
- Veverské Knínice (Brno-Country)
- Věž (Havlíčkův Brod)
- Věžky (Kroměříž)
- Věžky (Přerov)
- Věžná (Pelhřimov)
- Věžná (Žďár nad Sázavou)
- Věžnice (Havlíčkův Brod)
- Věžnice (Jihlava)
- Věžnička (Jihlava)
- Věžovatá Pláně (Český Krumlov)
- Vchynice (Litoměřice)
- Víceměřice (Prostějov)
- Vícemil (Jindřichův Hradec)
- Vícenice u Náměště nad Oslavou (Třebíč)
- Vícenice (Třebíč)
- Víchová nad Jizerou (Semily)
- Vícov (Prostějov)
- Vidče (Vsetín)
- Vídeň (Žďár nad Sázavou)
- Vidice (Domažlice)
- Vidice (Kutná Hora)
- Vidim (Mělník)
- Vidlatá Seč (Svitavy)
- Vidnava (town; Jeseník)
- Vidochov (Jičín)
- Vidonín (Žďár nad Sázavou)
- Vidov (České Budějovice)
- Vigantice (Vsetín)
- Vikantice (Šumperk)
- Vikýřovice (Šumperk)
- Vílanec (Jihlava)
- Vilantice (Trutnov)
- Vilémov (Děčín)
- Vilémov (market town; Havlíčkův Brod)
- Vilémov (Chomutov)
- Vilémov (Olomouc)
- Vilémovice (Blansko)
- Vilémovice (Havlíčkův Brod)
- Vilice (Tábor)
- Vimperk (town; Prachatice)
- Vinary (Hradec Králové)
- Vinary (Chrudim)
- Vinaře (Kutná Hora)
- Vinařice (Beroun)
- Vinařice (Kladno)
- Vinařice (Louny)
- Vinařice (Mladá Boleslav)
- Vincencov (Prostějov)
- Vinec (Mladá Boleslav)
- Viničné Šumice (Brno-Country)
- Vintířov (Sokolov)
- Vír (Žďár nad Sázavou)
- Víska u Jevíčka (Svitavy)
- Víska (Havlíčkův Brod)
- Vísky (Blansko)
- Vísky (Rokycany)
- Višňová (Jindřichův Hradec)
- Višňová (Liberec)
- Višňová (Příbram)
- Višňové (market town; Znojmo)
- Vítanov (Chrudim)
- Vitčice (Prostějov)
- Vítějeves (Svitavy)
- Vitějovice (Prachatice)
- Vítězná (Trutnov)
- Vitice (Kolín)
- Vitín (České Budějovice)
- Vitiněves (Jičín)
- Vítkov (town; Opava)
- Vítkovice (Semily)
- Vítonice (Kroměříž)
- Vítonice (Znojmo)
- Vizovice (town; Zlín)
- Vižina (Beroun)
- Vlachova Lhota (Zlín)
- Vlachovice (Zlín)
- Vlachovice (Žďár nad Sázavou)
- Vlachovo Březí (town; Prachatice)
- Vlačice (Kutná Hora)
- Vladislav (market town; Třebíč)
- Vlasatice (Brno-Country)
- Vlastec (Písek)
- Vlastějovice (Kutná Hora)
- Vlastiboř (Jablonec nad Nisou)
- Vlastiboř (Tábor)
- Vlastibořice (Liberec)
- Vlastislav (Litoměřice)
- Vlašim (town; Benešov)
- Vlčatín (Třebíč)
- Vlčetínec (Jindřichův Hradec)
- Vlčeves (Tábor)
- Vlčí Habřina (Pardubice)
- Vlčí (Plzeň-South)
- Vlčice (Jeseník)
- Vlčice (Trutnov)
- Vlčkov (Ústí nad Orlicí)
- Vlčková (Zlín)
- Vlčkovice v Podkrkonoší (Trutnov)
- Vlčnov (Uherské Hradiště)
- Vlčtejn (Plzeň-South)
- Vlkančice (Kolín)
- Vlkaneč (Kutná Hora)
- Vlkanov (Domažlice)
- Vlkanov (Havlíčkův Brod)
- Vlkava (Mladá Boleslav)
- Vlkoš (Hodonín)
- Vlkoš (Přerov)
- Vlkov (České Budějovice)
- Vlkov (Náchod)
- Vlkov (Tábor)
- Vlkov (Žďár nad Sázavou)
- Vlkov pod Oškobrhem (Nymburk)
- Vlkovice (Cheb)
- Vlksice (Písek)
- Vnorovy (Hodonín)
- Vochov (Plzeň-North)
- Voděrady (Blansko)
- Voděrady (Rychnov nad Kněžnou)
- Voděrady (Ústí nad Orlicí)
- Vodice (Tábor)
- Vodňany (town; Strakonice)
- Vodochody (Prague-East)
- Vodranty (Kutná Hora)
- Vodslivy (Benešov)
- Vohančice (Brno-Country)
- Vojkov (Benešov)
- Vojkovice (Brno-Country)
- Vojkovice (Frýdek-Místek)
- Vojkovice (Karlovy Vary)
- Vojkovice (Mělník)
- Vojníkov (Písek)
- Vojnův Městec (market town; Žďár nad Sázavou)
- Vojslavice (Pelhřimov)
- Vojtanov (Cheb)
- Vojtěchov (Chrudim)
- Vokov (Pelhřimov)
- Volanice (Jičín)
- Volárna (Kolín)
- Volary (town; Prachatice)
- Volduchy (Rokycany)
- Voleč (Pardubice)
- Volenice (Příbram)
- Volenice (Strakonice)
- Volevčice (Jihlava)
- Volevčice (Most)
- Volfartice (Česká Lípa)
- Volfířov (Jindřichův Hradec)
- Volyně (town; Strakonice)
- Vonoklasy (Prague-West)
- Vortová (Chrudim)
- Votice (town; Benešov)
- Voznice (Příbram)
- Vrábče (České Budějovice)
- Vraclav (Ústí nad Orlicí)
- Vracov (town; Hodonín)
- Vracovice (Benešov)
- Vracovice (Znojmo)
- Vračovice-Orlov (Ústí nad Orlicí)
- Vraňany (Mělník)
- Vrančice (Příbram)
- Vrané nad Vltavou (Prague-West)
- Vranov (Benešov)
- Vranov (Brno-Country)
- Vranov (Tachov)
- Vranov nad Dyjí (market town; Znojmo)
- Vranová Lhota (Svitavy)
- Vranová (Blansko)
- Vranovice (Brno-Country)
- Vranovice (Příbram)
- Vranovice-Kelčice (Prostějov)
- Vranovská Ves (Znojmo)
- Vraný (market town; Kladno)
- Vratěnín (market town; Znojmo)
- Vratimov (town; Ostrava-City)
- Vratislávka (Brno-Country)
- Vrátkov (Kolín)
- Vrátno (Mladá Boleslav)
- Vráto (České Budějovice)
- Vráž (Beroun)
- Vráž (Písek)
- Vražkov (Litoměřice)
- Vražné (Nový Jičín)
- Vrážné (Svitavy)
- Vrbátky (Prostějov)
- Vrbatův Kostelec (Chrudim)
- Vrbčany (Kolín)
- Vrbice (Břeclav)
- Vrbice (Jičín)
- Vrbice (Karlovy Vary)
- Vrbice (Litoměřice)
- Vrbice (Nymburk)
- Vrbice (Prachatice)
- Vrbice (Rychnov nad Kněžnou)
- Vrbičany (Kladno)
- Vrbičany (Litoměřice)
- Vrbka (Kroměříž)
- Vrbno nad Lesy (Louny)
- Vrbno pod Pradědem (town; Bruntál)
- Vrbová Lhota (Kolín)
- Vrbovec (Znojmo)
- Vrchlabí (town; Trutnov)
- Vrchoslavice (Prostějov)
- Vrchotovy Janovice (market town; Benešov)
- Vrchovany (Česká Lípa)
- Vrchovnice (Hradec Králové)
- Vrchy (Nový Jičín)
- Vrcovice (Písek)
- Vrčeň (Plzeň-South)
- Vrdy (Kutná Hora)
- Vrhaveč (Klatovy)
- Vřesina (Opava)
- Vřesina (Ostrava-City)
- Vřeskovice (Klatovy)
- Vřesník (Jičín)
- Vřesová (Sokolov)
- Vřesovice (Hodonín)
- Vřesovice (Prostějov)
- Vroutek (town; Louny)
- Vrskmaň (Chomutov)
- Vršce (Jičín)
- Vršovice (Louny)
- Vršovice (Opava)
- Vršovka (Náchod)
- Vrutice (Litoměřice)
- Vsetín (town; Vsetín)
- Vstiš (Plzeň-South)
- Všechlapy (Benešov)
- Všechlapy (Nymburk)
- Všechovice (Brno-Country)
- Všechovice (Přerov)
- Všehrdy (Chomutov)
- Všehrdy (Plzeň-North)
- Všejany (Mladá Boleslav)
- Všekary (Plzeň-North)
- Všelibice (Liberec)
- Všemina (Zlín)
- Všemyslice (České Budějovice)
- Všeň (Semily)
- Všenice (Rokycany)
- Všenory (Prague-West)
- Všepadly (Domažlice)
- Všeradice (Beroun)
- Všeradov (Chrudim)
- Všeruby (market town; Domažlice)
- Všeruby (town; Plzeň-North)
- Všestary (Hradec Králové)
- Všestary (Prague-East)
- Všestudy (Chomutov)
- Všestudy (Mělník)
- Všesulov (Rakovník)
- Všetaty (market town; Mělník)
- Všetaty (Rakovník)
- Vševily (Příbram)
- Výčapy (Třebíč)
- Vydří (Jindřichův Hradec)
- Vykáň (Nymburk)
- Vyklantice (Pelhřimov)
- Výkleky (Přerov)
- Výprachtice (Ústí nad Orlicí)
- Výrava (Hradec Králové)
- Výrov (Plzeň-North)
- Výrovice (Znojmo)
- Vyšehněvice (Pardubice)
- Vyšehoří (Šumperk)
- Vyšehořovice (Prague-East)
- Vyskeř (Semily)
- Vyškov (town; Vyškov)
- Výškov (Louny)
- Vyškovec (Uherské Hradiště)
- Vyskytná nad Jihlavou (Jihlava)
- Vyskytná (Pelhřimov)
- Výsluní (town; Chomutov)
- Vyšní Lhoty (Frýdek-Místek)
- Vysočany (Blansko)
- Vysočany (Znojmo)
- Vysočina (Chrudim)
- Vysoká (Bruntál)
- Vysoká (Havlíčkův Brod)
- Vysoká (Mělník)
- Vysoká (Svitavy)
- Vysoká Lhota (Pelhřimov)
- Vysoká Libyně (Plzeň-North)
- Vysoká nad Labem (Hradec Králové)
- Vysoká Pec (Chomutov)
- Vysoká Pec (Karlovy Vary)
- Vysoká Srbská (Náchod)
- Vysoká u Příbramě (Příbram)
- Vysoké Chvojno (Pardubice)
- Vysoké Mýto (town; Ústí nad Orlicí)
- Vysoké nad Jizerou (town; Semily)
- Vysoké Pole (Zlín)
- Vysoké Popovice (Brno-Country)
- Vysoké Studnice (Jihlava)
- Vysoké Veselí (town; Jičín)
- Vysoké (Žďár nad Sázavou)
- Vysokov (Náchod)
- Vysoký Chlumec (market town; Příbram)
- Vysoký Újezd (Benešov)
- Vysoký Újezd (Beroun)
- Vysoký Újezd (Hradec Králové)
- Výšovice (Prostějov)
- Vyšší Brod (town; Český Krumlov)
- Vystrčenovice (Jihlava)
- Vystrkov (Pelhřimov)
- Výžerky (Kolín)
- Vyžice (Chrudim)
- Vyžlovka (Kolín)

== X ==
- Xaverov (Benešov)

== Z ==
- Žabčice (Brno-Country)
- Žabeň (Frýdek-Místek)
- Zábeštní Lhota (Přerov)
- Záblatí (Jindřichův Hradec)
- Záblatí (Prachatice)
- Záblatí (Žďár nad Sázavou)
- Žabonosy (Kolín)
- Žabovřesky nad Ohří (Litoměřice)
- Žabovřesky (České Budějovice)
- Záboří (České Budějovice)
- Záboří (Strakonice)
- Záboří nad Labem (Kutná Hora)
- Záborná (Jihlava)
- Zábrdí (Prachatice)
- Zábrodí (Náchod)
- Zabrušany (Teplice)
- Zábřeh (town; Šumperk)
- Zábřezí-Řečice (Trutnov)
- Žacléř (town; Trutnov)
- Zadní Chodov (Tachov)
- Zadní Střítež (Tábor)
- Zadní Třebaň (Beroun)
- Zadní Vydří (Jihlava)
- Zadní Zhořec (Žďár nad Sázavou)
- Zádolí (Ústí nad Orlicí)
- Žádovice (Hodonín)
- Zádub-Závišín (Cheb)
- Zádveřice-Raková (Zlín)
- Zahájí (České Budějovice)
- Zahnašovice (Kroměříž)
- Zahorčice (Strakonice)
- Záhornice (Nymburk)
- Záhorovice (Uherské Hradiště)
- Zahořany (Domažlice)
- Zahořany (Prague-West)
- Záhoří (Jindřichův Hradec)
- Záhoří (Písek)
- Záhoří (Semily)
- Záhoří (Tábor)
- Zahrádka (Plzeň-North)
- Zahrádka (Třebíč)
- Zahrádky (Česká Lípa)
- Zahrádky (Jindřichův Hradec)
- Záchlumí (Tachov)
- Záchlumí (Ústí nad Orlicí)
- Zachotín (Pelhřimov)
- Zachrašťany (Hradec Králové)
- Zaječí (Břeclav)
- Zaječice (Chrudim)
- Zaječov (Beroun)
- Zájezd (Kladno)
- Zájezdec (Chrudim)
- Zajíčkov (Pelhřimov)
- Žákava (Plzeň-South)
- Zákolany (Kladno)
- Žákovice (Přerov)
- Zakřany (Brno-Country)
- Zákupy (town; Česká Lípa)
- Žáky (Kutná Hora)
- Žalany (Teplice)
- Zálesí (Znojmo)
- Zálesná Zhoř (Brno-Country)
- Zalešany (Kolín)
- Zálezlice (Mělník)
- Zálezly (Prachatice)
- Žalhostice (Litoměřice)
- Žalkovice (Kroměříž)
- Zaloňov (Náchod)
- Zálší (Tábor)
- Zálší (Ústí nad Orlicí)
- Zalužany (Příbram)
- Záluží (Beroun)
- Záluží (Litoměřice)
- Zálužice (Louny)
- Žamberk (town; Ústí nad Orlicí)
- Záměl (Rychnov nad Kněžnou)
- Zámostí-Blata (Jičín)
- Žampach (Ústí nad Orlicí)
- Zámrsk (Ústí nad Orlicí)
- Zámrsky (Přerov)
- Žandov (town; Česká Lípa)
- Zápy (market town; Prague-East)
- Žár (České Budějovice)
- Žáravice (Pardubice)
- Zářecká Lhota (Ústí nad Orlicí)
- Záříčí (Kroměříž)
- Žarošice (Hodonín)
- Žárovná (Prachatice)
- Zárubice (Třebíč)
- Záryby (Mělník)
- Zásada (market town; Jablonec nad Nisou)
- Zásmuky (town; Kolín)
- Zastávka (Brno-Country)
- Zástřizly (Kroměříž)
- Zašová (Vsetín)
- Zašovice (Třebíč)
- Žatčany (Brno-Country)
- Žatec (Jihlava)
- Žatec (town; Louny)
- Zátor (Bruntál)
- Závada (Opava)
- Zavidov (Rakovník)
- Závist (Blansko)
- Závišice (Nový Jičín)
- Zavlekov (Klatovy)
- Závraty (České Budějovice)
- Zbečno (Rakovník)
- Zbelítov (Písek)
- Zbenice (Příbram)
- Zběšičky (Písek)
- Zbilidy (Jihlava)
- Zbinohy (Jihlava)
- Zbiroh (town; Rokycany)
- Zbizuby (Kutná Hora)
- Zblovice (Znojmo)
- Zborov (Šumperk)
- Zborovice (Kroměříž)
- Zborovy (Klatovy)
- Zbožíčko (Nymburk)
- Zbraslav (Brno-Country)
- Zbraslavec (Blansko)
- Zbraslavice (Kutná Hora)
- Zbrašín (Louny)
- Zbůch (Plzeň-North)
- Zbuzany (Prague-West)
- Zbyslavice (Ostrava-City)
- Zbýšov (town; Brno-Country)
- Zbýšov (Kutná Hora)
- Zbýšov (Vyškov)
- Zbytiny (Prachatice)
- Ždánice (town; Hodonín)
- Ždánice (Kolín)
- Ždánice (Žďár nad Sázavou)
- Ždánov (Domažlice)
- Žďár (Blansko)
- Žďár (Jindřichův Hradec)
- Žďár (Mladá Boleslav)
- Žďár (Písek)
- Žďár (Rakovník)
- Žďár nad Metují (Náchod)
- Žďár nad Orlicí (Rychnov nad Kněžnou)
- Žďár nad Sázavou (town; Žďár nad Sázavou)
- Žďárec (Brno-Country)
- Žďárek (Liberec)
- Žďárky (Náchod)
- Žďárná (Blansko)
- Zděchov (Vsetín)
- Zdechovice (Hradec Králové)
- Zdechovice (Pardubice)
- Zdelov (Rychnov nad Kněžnou)
- Zdemyslice (Plzeň-South)
- Zdeňkov (Jihlava)
- Zderaz (Chrudim)
- Zdětín (Mladá Boleslav)
- Zdětín (Prostějov)
- Zdiby (Prague-East)
- Zdice (town; Beroun)
- Zdíkov (Prachatice)
- Ždírec (Česká Lípa)
- Ždírec (Havlíčkův Brod)
- Ždírec (Jihlava)
- Ždírec (Plzeň-South)
- Ždírec nad Doubravou (town; Havlíčkův Brod)
- Zdislava (market town; Liberec)
- Zdislavice (market town; Benešov)
- Zdobín (Trutnov)
- Zdobnice (Rychnov nad Kněžnou)
- Zdounky (Kroměříž)
- Zduchovice (Příbram)
- Žebrák (town; Beroun)
- Žehuň (Nymburk)
- Žehušice (market town; Kutná Hora)
- Želatovice (Přerov)
- Želeč (Prostějov)
- Želeč (Tábor)
- Želechovice (Olomouc)
- Zelená Hora (Vyškov)
- Zeleneč (Prague-East)
- Zelenecká Lhota (Jičín)
- Želenice (Kladno)
- Želenice (Most)
- Želešice (Brno-Country)
- Želetava (market town; Třebíč)
- Želetice (Hodonín)
- Želetice (Znojmo)
- Železná (Beroun)
- Železná Ruda (town; Klatovy)
- Železné (Brno-Country)
- Železnice (town; Jičín)
- Železný Brod (town; Jablonec nad Nisou)
- Želiv (Pelhřimov)
- Želivsko (Svitavy)
- Želízy (Mělník)
- Želkovice (Louny)
- Želnava (Prachatice)
- Zemětice (Plzeň-South)
- Ženklava (Nový Jičín)
- Žeranovice (Kroměříž)
- Žeravice (Hodonín)
- Žeraviny (Hodonín)
- Žerčice (Mladá Boleslav)
- Žeretice (Jičín)
- Žermanice (Frýdek-Místek)
- Žernov (market town; Náchod)
- Žernov (Semily)
- Žernovice (Prachatice)
- Žernovník (Blansko)
- Žerotice (Znojmo)
- Žerotín (Louny)
- Žerotín (Olomouc)
- Žerůtky (Blansko)
- Žerůtky (Znojmo)
- Zhoř (Brno-Country)
- Zhoř (Jihlava)
- Zhoř (Písek)
- Zhoř (Tachov)
- Zhoř u Mladé Vožice (Tábor)
- Zhoř u Tábora (Tábor)
- Zhořec (Pelhřimov)
- Židlochovice (town; Brno-Country)
- Židněves (Mladá Boleslav)
- Židovice (Jičín)
- Židovice (Litoměřice)
- Žihle (Plzeň-North)
- Žihobce (Klatovy)
- Žichlínek (Ústí nad Orlicí)
- Zichovec (Kladno)
- Žichovice (Klatovy)
- Žilina (Kladno)
- Žilov (Plzeň-North)
- Žim (Teplice)
- Žimutice (České Budějovice)
- Žinkovy (market town; Plzeň-South)
- Žirov (Pelhřimov)
- Žirovnice (town; Pelhřimov)
- Žíšov (Tábor)
- Žitenice (Litoměřice)
- Žítková (Uherské Hradiště)
- Žitovlice (Nymburk)
- Živanice (Pardubice)
- Životice u Nového Jičína (Nový Jičín)
- Životice (Plzeň-South)
- Žiželice (Kolín)
- Žiželice (Louny)
- Žižice (Kladno)
- Žižkovo Pole (Havlíčkův Brod)
- Zlámanec (Uherské Hradiště)
- Zlatá Koruna (Český Krumlov)
- Zlatá Olešnice (Jablonec nad Nisou)
- Zlatá Olešnice (Trutnov)
- Zlatá (Prague-East)
- Zlaté Hory (town; Jeseník)
- Zlátenka (Pelhřimov)
- Zlatníky-Hodkovice (Prague-West)
- Žlebské Chvalovice (Chrudim)
- Žleby (Kutná Hora)
- Zlechov (Uherské Hradiště)
- Zlín (city; Zlín)
- Zliv (town; České Budějovice)
- Zlobice (Kroměříž)
- Zlončice (Mělník)
- Zlonice (market town; Kladno)
- Zlonín (Prague-East)
- Zlosyň (Mělník)
- Zlukov (Tábor)
- Žlunice (Jičín)
- Žlutava (Zlín)
- Žlutice (town; Karlovy Vary)
- Znětínek (Žďár nad Sázavou)
- Znojmo (town; Znojmo)
- Zruč-Senec (Plzeň-North)
- Zruč nad Sázavou (town; Kutná Hora)
- Zubčice (Český Krumlov)
- Zubří (town; Vsetín)
- Zubří (Žďár nad Sázavou)
- Zubrnice (Ústí nad Labem)
- Žulová (town; Jeseník)
- Žumberk (market town; Chrudim)
- Županovice (Jindřichův Hradec)
- Županovice (Příbram)
- Zvánovice (Prague-East)
- Zvěrkovice (Třebíč)
- Zvěrotice (Tábor)
- Zvěřínek (Nymburk)
- Zvěstov (Benešov)
- Zvěstovice (Havlíčkův Brod)
- Zvíkov (České Budějovice)
- Zvíkov (Český Krumlov)
- Zvíkovec (market town; Rokycany)
- Zvíkovské Podhradí (Písek)
- Zvole (Prague-West)
- Zvole (Šumperk)
- Zvole (Žďár nad Sázavou)
- Zvoleněves (Kladno)
- Zvolenovice (Jihlava)
- Zvotoky (Strakonice)

== See also ==
- List of cities and towns in the Czech Republic
