= Onishchenko =

Onishchenko, also transliterated as Onischenko or Onishenko, is a Ukrainian surname (Ukrainian: Оніщенко) and Russian surname of Ukrainian origin (Russian: Онищенко). There exists a Russified version of the surname, Anishchenko (Russian: Анищенко).

Notable people with the surname include:

- Alexandr Onishenko (born 1957), Ukrainian and Chekh artist
- Andriy Anishchenko (born 1975), Ukrainian footballer
- Boris Onishchenko (born 1937), Ukrainian Soviet modern pentathlete
- Gennadiy Onishchenko (born 1950), Russian politician

== See also ==
- Onyshchenko
