= Bušovice =

- Municipality
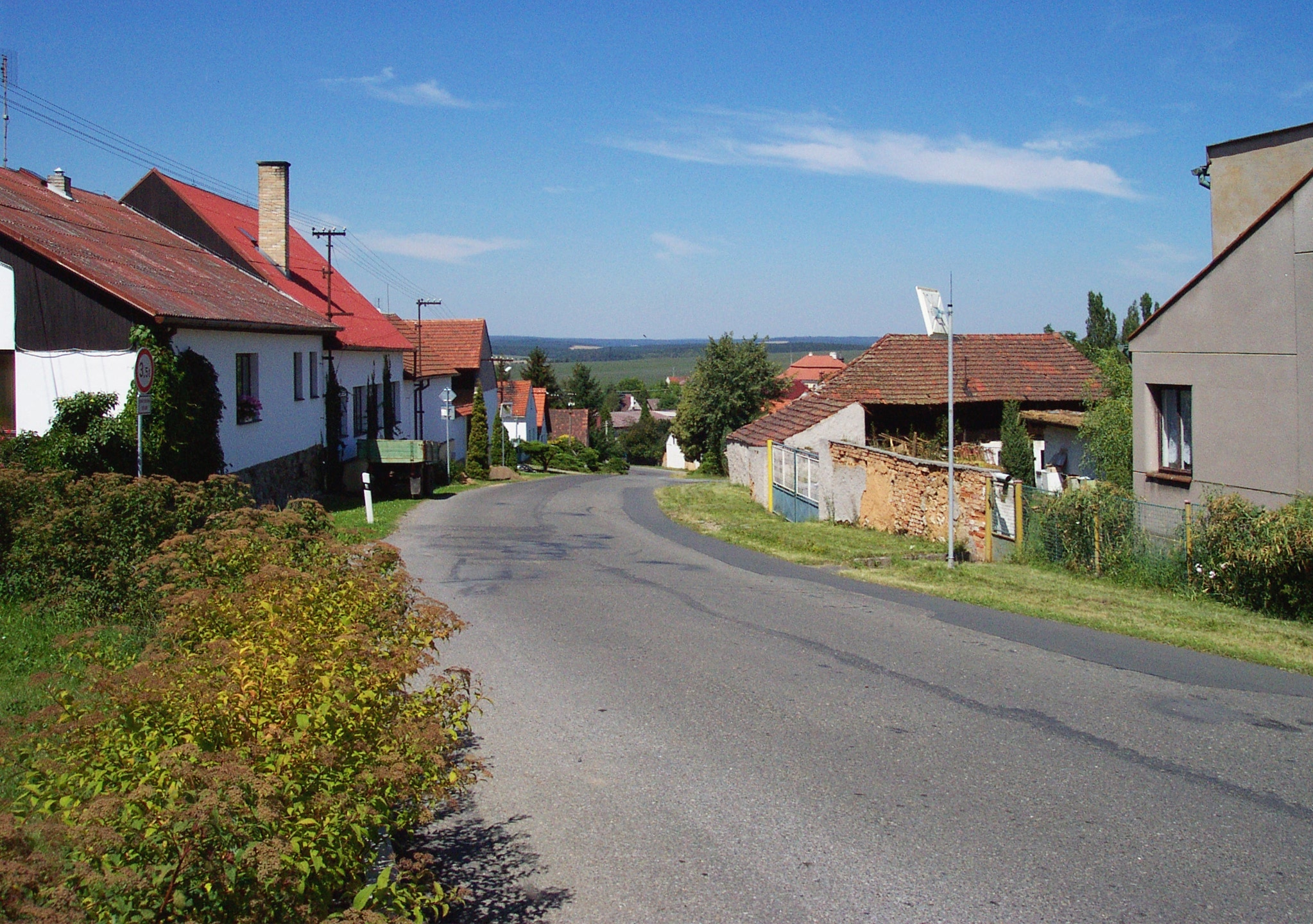
- Main road

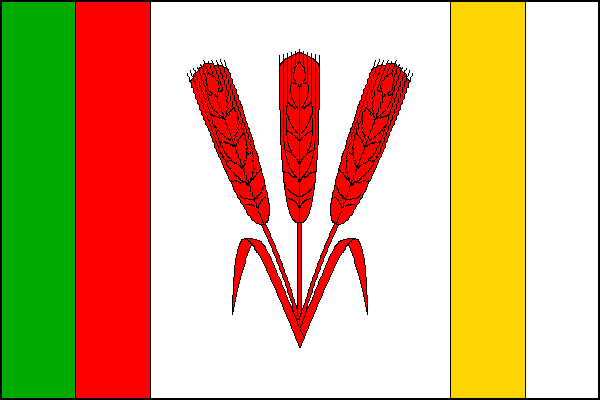
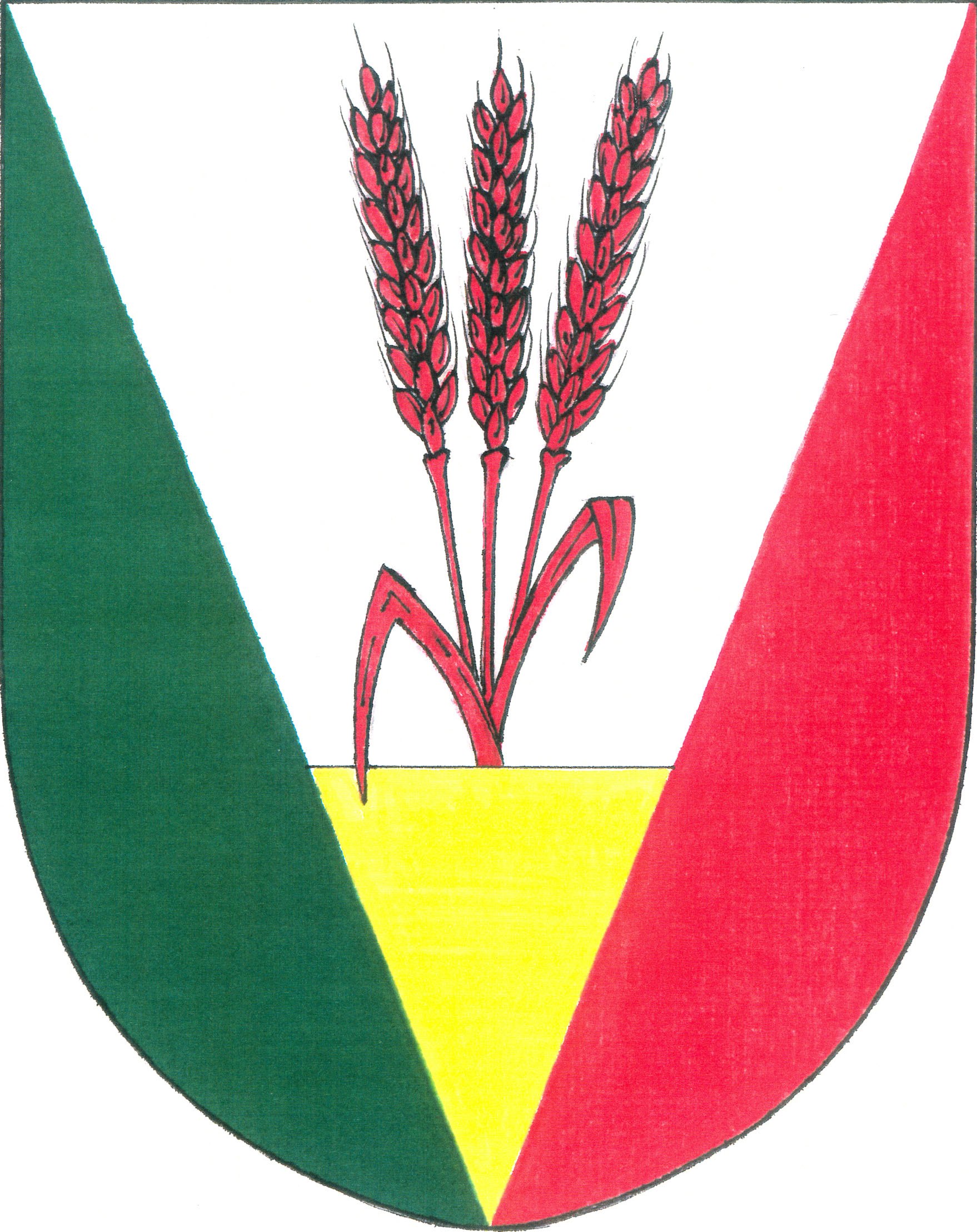
- Flag Coat of arms

- Location in the Czech Republic
- Coordinates: 49°47′44″N 13°32′5″E
- Country: Czech Republic
- Region: Plzeň
- District: Rokycany
- First mentioned: 1115

Area
  - Total: 11.23 km^{2} (4.34 sq mi)
- Elevation: 380 m (1,250 ft)

Population (2026-01-01)
  - Total: 660
  - Density: 59/km^{2} (150/sq mi)
- Time zone: UTC+1 (CET)
  - Summer (DST): UTC+2 (CEST)
- Postal code: 338 23
- Website: www.busovice.cz

Bušovice is a municipality and village in Rokycany District in the Plzeň Region of the Czech Republic. It has about 700 inhabitants.

== Administrative division ==
Bušovice consists of three municipal parts (in brackets population according to the 2021 census):

- Bušovice (353)
- Sedlecko (194)
- Střapole (96)

== Etymology ==
The name Bušovice is derived from the personal name Búš, meaning "the village of Búš's people".

== Geography ==
Bušovice is located about 7 kilometres (4 mi) northwest of Rokycany and 12 km (7 mi) northeast of Plzeň. It lies on the border between the Plasy Uplands and Švihov Highlands. The highest point is the hill Kokotsko at 501 m (1,644 ft) above sea level. The Berounka River briefly flows along the northern municipal border, just outside the municipality.

== History ==
The first written mention of Bušovice is from 1115, when the village was owned by the monastery in Kladruby. From the 14th century, Bušovice was owned by various lesser noblemen and often changed hands. In the mid-17th century, Bušovice was divided into two parts with different owners and one of the parts belonged to the city of Plzeň. From 1745 until the establishment of an independent municipality in 1849, the entire village was a property of the city of Plzeň.

Sedlecko was first mentioned in 1118. In 1581, the area belonged to the Smědčice estate, however, Sedlecko was described as an abandoned village. Sometime in the following decades, the village was purchased by the city of Plzeň.

The first written mention of Střapole is from 1283. The village belonged to the Bušovice estate until 1449, when it was bought by the city of Plzeň.

== Demographics ==
Historical population

Year	Pop.	±%
1869	697	—
1880	689	−1.1%
1890	712	+3.3%
1900	676	−5.1%
1910	778	+15.1%

Year	Pop.	±%
1921	779	+0.1%
1930	793	+1.8%
1950	786	−0.9%
1961	720	−8.4%
1970	673	−6.5%

Year	Pop.	±%
1980	589	−12.5%
1991	514	−12.7%
2001	521	+1.4%
2011	562	+7.9%
2021	643	+14.4%

Source: Censuses

== Transport ==
Sedlecko and Střapole are located on the railway line Radnice–Bezdružice via Plzeň.

== Sights ==
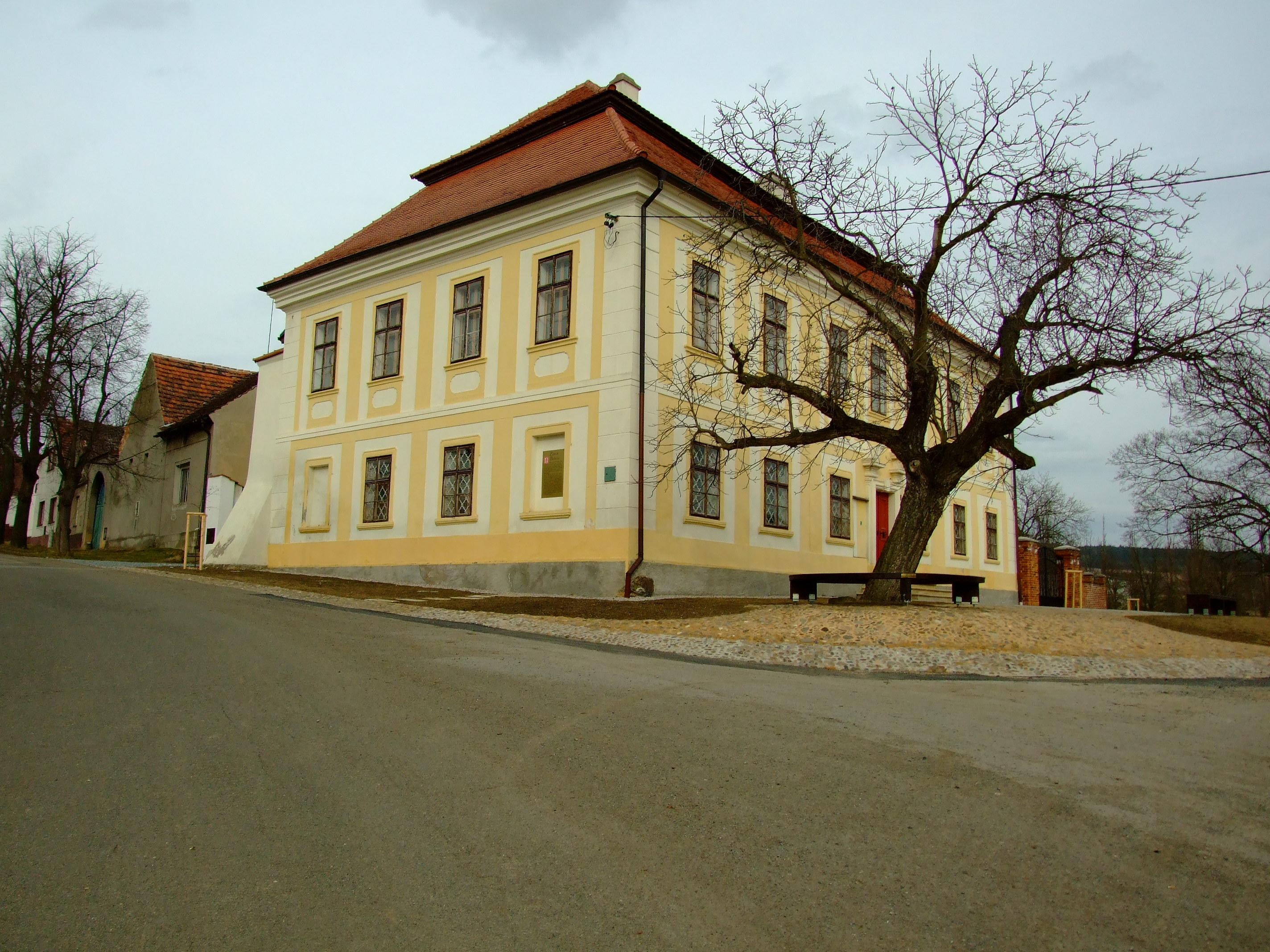
Bušovice Castle

The main landmark of Bušovice is the Bušovice Castle. It was built for the Videršperk noble family in the Baroque style around 1710. The castle was probably designed the architect Jakub Auguston.
