= Onyshchenko =

Onyshchenko (Ukrainian: Онищенко), also transliterated as Onyschenko, is a Ukrainian surname. There exists a Russified version of the surname, Anishchenko (Russian: Анищенко).

Notable people with the surname include:

- Boris Onishchenko (born 1937), Ukrainian modern pentathlete
- Denys Onyshchenko (born 1978), Ukrainian footballer
- Oleksandr Onyshchenko (born 1969), Ukrainian politician
- Volodymyr Onyshchenko (born 1949), Soviet footballer and Ukrainian manager

== See also ==
- Onishchenko
- Anishchenko
