= Smědčice =

- Municipality
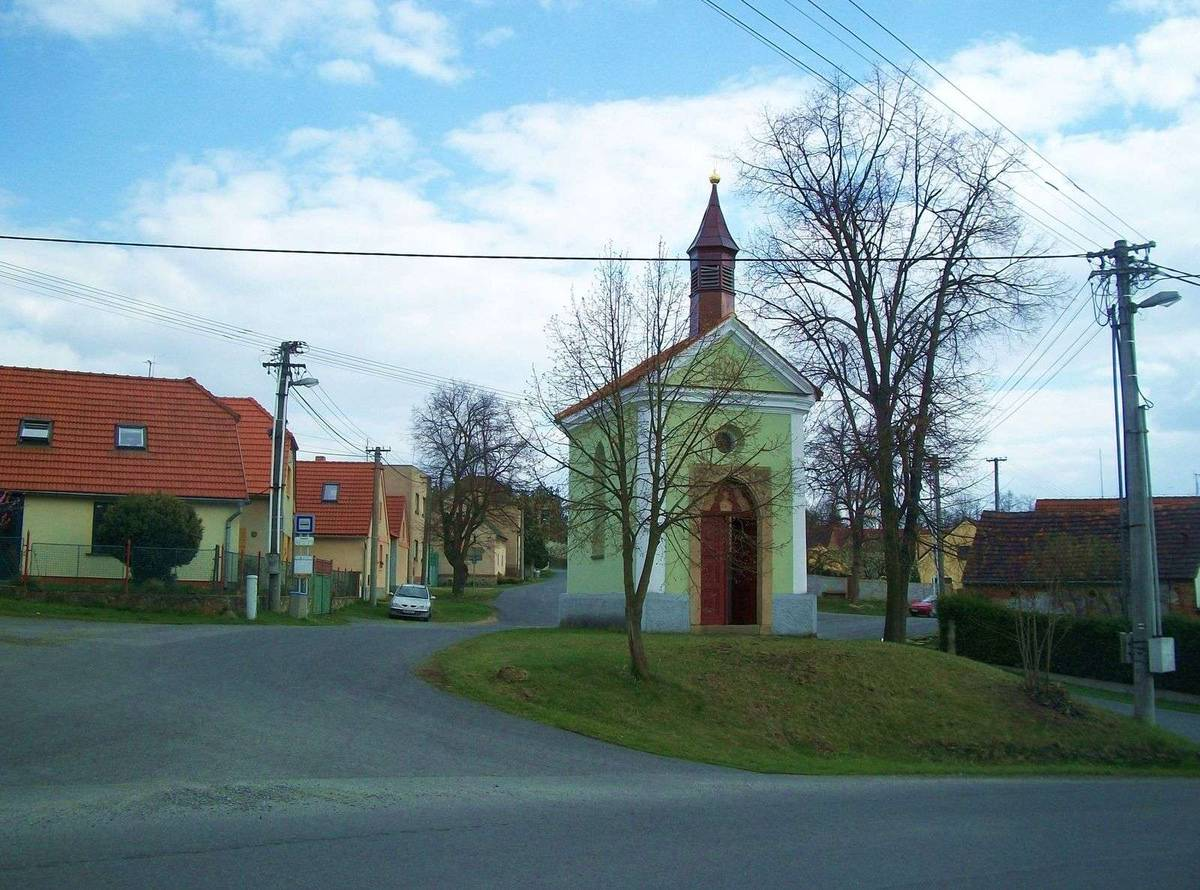
- Centre of Smědčice

- Location in the Czech Republic
- Coordinates: 49°47′31″N 13°30′54″E
- Country: Czech Republic
- Region: Plzeň
- District: Rokycany
- First mentioned: 1243

Area
  - Total: 3.78 km^{2} (1.46 sq mi)
- Elevation: 344 m (1,129 ft)

Population (2026-01-01)
  - Total: 314
  - Density: 83.1/km^{2} (215/sq mi)
- Time zone: UTC+1 (CET)
  - Summer (DST): UTC+2 (CEST)
- Postal code: 338 24
- Website: smedcice.cz

Smědčice is a municipality and village in Rokycany District in the Plzeň Region of the Czech Republic. It has about 300 inhabitants.

== Etymology ==
The name is derived from the personal name Smědec or Smiedek, meaning "the village of Smědec's/Smiedek's people".

== Geography ==
Smědčice is located about 8 kilometres (5 mi) northwest of Rokycany and 11 km (7 mi) northeast of Plzeň. It lies in the Plasy Uplands. The highest point is at 410 m (1,345 ft) above sea level. The northern municipal border is formed by the Berounka River. The Klabava River flows to the Berounka along the western municipal border.

== History ==
The first written mention of Smědčice is in a deed of the Chotěšov Abbey from 1243. Until 1581, the village was owned by various lesser noblemen. From 1581 until the establishment of an independent municipality in 1848, Smědčice belonged to the Plzeň estate. In 1960–1990, the village was under administration of Bušovice.

== Demographics ==
Historical population

Year	Pop.	±%
1869	237	—
1880	252	+6.3%
1890	244	−3.2%
1900	240	−1.6%
1910	271	+12.9%

Year	Pop.	±%
1921	255	−5.9%
1930	280	+9.8%
1950	246	−12.1%
1961	260	+5.7%
1970	208	−20.0%

Year	Pop.	±%
1980	143	−31.2%
1991	135	−5.6%
2001	126	−6.7%
2011	266	+111.1%
2021	343	+28.9%

Source: Censuses

== Transport ==
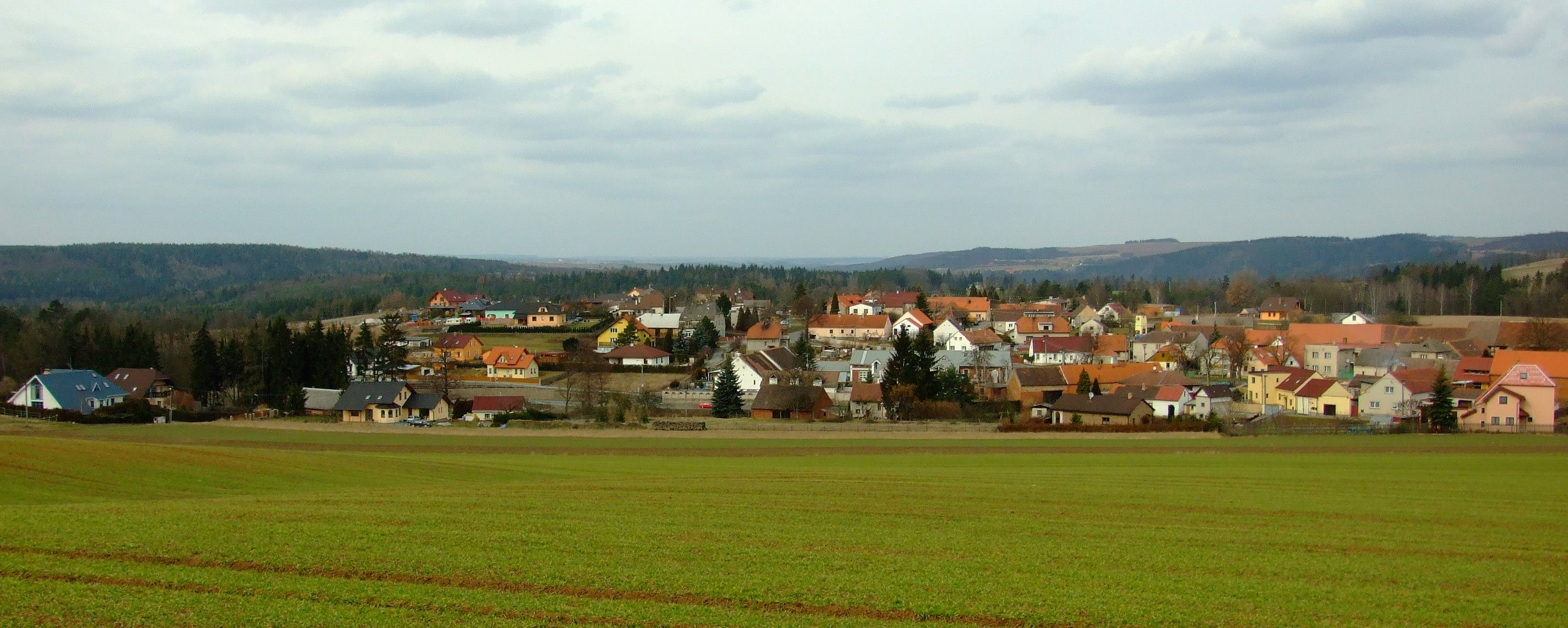
View from the southeast

The railway line Radnice–Bezdružice runs through Smědčice, but there is no train station. The municipality is served by the stations in neighbouring Chrást and Sedlecko.

== Sights ==
The main landmark of Smědčice is the Chapel of Saint Wenceslaus. It was built between 1848 and 1875 on the site of an older chapel.
