= Alexandr Onishenko =

Ukrainian artist

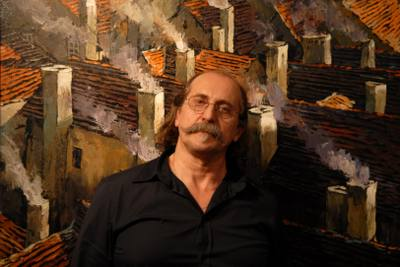
- Alexandr Onishenko, 2008
- Born: 1957 (age 68–69); Chernihiv, Ukraine
- Education: University of Kyiv, Kyiv, Ukraine
- Known for: Painting
- Awards: Franz Kafka Prize, The Masaryk Academy of Sciences Award

Alexandr Onishenko, Czech: Alexandr Oniščenko is an artist based in Prague, Czech Republic. Well known for his vibrant impressionist paintings, his work is exhibited throughout Europe and the United States.

== Life and career ==
Alexandr Onishenko was born in 1957 in Chernihiv, Ukraine. His artistic studies were encouraged and supported from an early age by his father. In 1979, he graduated from the Institute of Art in Kyiv and became a member of the Russian Art Union.

State regulation of the arts under the Soviet Union encouraged Onishenko and many other young artists to rebel and form an illegal artists’ collective, which was housed in the Yeletsky Monastery.

In 1981, Onishenko and several companions moved to the Tevriz district of Omsk Oblast in Siberia. After six years of “self-exile”, he returned to Ukraine in 1987. Fleeing the increasing political turmoil in the years just before the fall of the Soviet Union, Onishenko moved to Yugoslavia briefly before settling in Prague, Czech Republic, in 1991.

After years of painting on the famous Charles Bridge, Onishenko met with such success that he opened his own gallery in 1994 (Galerie Jakubska) in Prague’s Old Town.

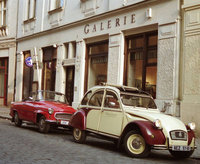
Alexandr Onishenko's Galerie Jakubská in Prague, Czech Republic

Onishenko presently resides in Prague and has become one the city's most accomplished artists receiving both the Franz Kafka Prize and the Masaryk Academy of Sciences Award.

The artist Alexander Onischenko has had the good fortune to acquire prestigious and spacious premises in the very heart of magical Malá Strana, in the former Hartigovský Palace (also known as the Věžníkovský, Salmovský or Šelmberkovský Palace). A medieval burgher house originally stood on this site, which was rebuilt in the late Gothic style between 1485 and 1495 and then in the Renaissance style sometime before 1580. After 1670, Isabela Švihovská of Salm had a palace built here, to which a garden was later attached. In 1718, Romedius Věžník z Věžník (1696–1720) briefly took ownership of the Romedius Palace, and after 1720, when Ludvik Josef Hartig (1685–1735) acquired the property, the palace was remodelled in its current form - probably based on a design by F. I. Prée or F. M. Kaňka. The palace also incorporates the building next door, no. 183/18, a late Gothic structure, renovated in the Renaissance style at the beginning of the 17th century. The early Baroque reconstruction of the building took place before 1668 with further work during the period from 1680 to 1696. Between 1896 and 1907, Charles University Professor Tomáš Masaryk, later President of Czechoslovakia, lived at this address. From 1920 to 1921 the building was rebuilt as the German embassy, to a design by the German architect Adolf Foehr. It is likely that the Fuhrer of the German Reich, Adolf Hitler, dined and maybe even spent the night here on March 15, 1939, during the occupation of Czechoslovakia. At the end of World War II, it became the headquarters of the Czechoslovak Red Cross. After 1990, as part of the national restitution process, both palace buildings were restored to private ownership. This historic building with its rich history now houses the painter Alexander Onishenko’s art salon, "Galerie Jakubská". The genius loci of the palace will be further enhanced by his present and future works.

== Artwork ==
The signatures style of Alexandr Onishenko's Impressionism work includes exclusive use of the palette knife and painting on black canvases. The artist's description of his own work as "New Impressionism" is not to be confused with the pointillism of Neo-Impressionism. Its own distinction lies in the use of a traditional impasto painting technique wherein paint is applied in heavy, textured quantity and sometimes even mixed directly on the surface of the canvas, while at the same time Onishenko departs dramatically from traditional Impressionism by beginning on a pitch-black surface. This reversal of the painting process – moving from darkness to light – brings with it the high level of contrast and vibrancy of color that the artist's paintings are known for.

Alexandr Onishenko portrays a wide variety of subjects in his work, including still life, nudes, land and cityscapes. In later years, he has become known for his bird's-eye perspective paintings of the rooftops of Prague.

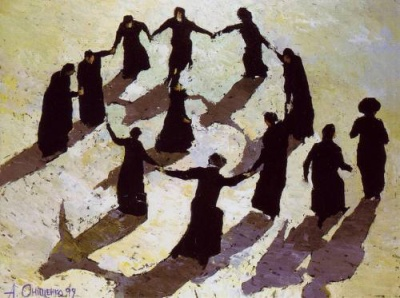
"Jewish Dance" 1999

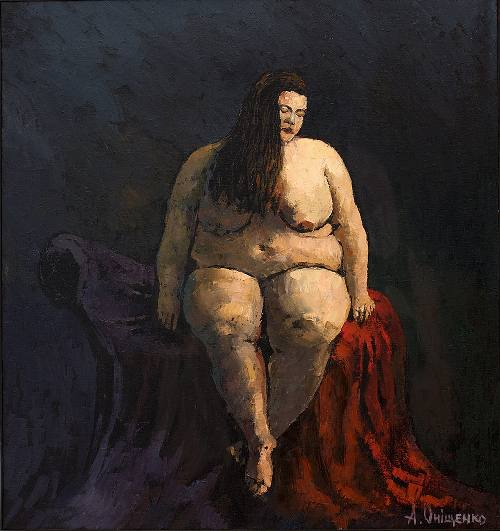
"Status Quo" 2008

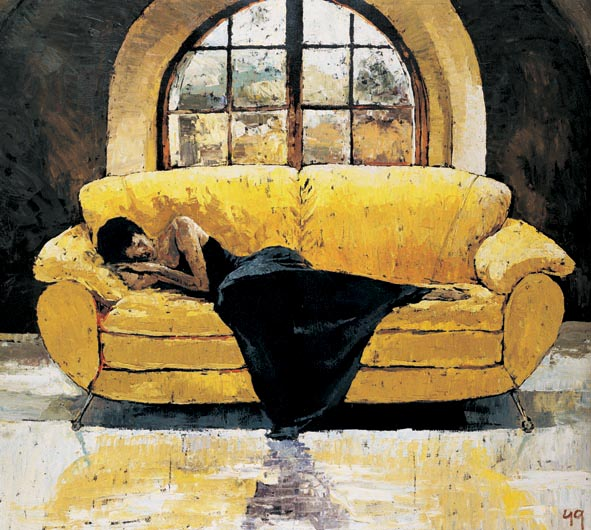
"Sofa" 1999

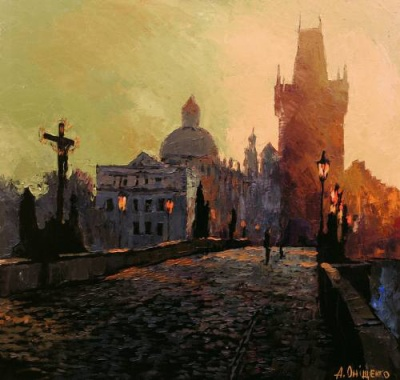
"Charles Bridge" 2006

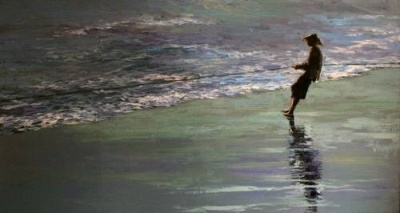
"Man and His Destiny" 2009

=== Selected solo exhibitions ===
United States

- 2019 Solo exhibition, Broadmoor Galleries, Colorado Spring, Colorado
- 2018 Solo exhibition, Filsinger Gallery - Fossil & Contemporary Art. Palm Desert, California
- 2016 Solo exhibition, Broadmoor Galleries, Colorado Spring, Colorado
- 2015 Solo exhibition, Filsinger Gallery - Fossil & Contemporary Art. Palm Desert, California
- 2014 Joint exhibition, Filsinger Gallery - Fossil & Contemporary Art. Palm Desert, California
- 2014 Solo exhibition, Hayden-Hays Gallery. Colorado Springs, Colorado 2013 Solo exhibition, Hayden-Hays Gallery. Colorado Springs, Colorado 2012 Solo exhibition, Tay Creek Gallery. Arlington, Texas
- 2012 Group exhibition Broadmoor Galleries. Colorado Springs, Colorado 1999 Solo exhibition, Park Avenue Atrium. New York, New York

United Kingdom

- 2011 Solo exhibition, Sounds of Light, 38devonshirestreet. London
- 2009 Solo exhibition, The Royal Institute of British Architects (RIBA). London 2008 Solo exhibition, The Smithfield Gallery. London
- 2007 Joint exhibition, Langham Fine Art Gallery. Suffolk
- 2007 Group exhibition, Graham Fine Art Gallery. London
- 2006 Joint exhibition, Langham Fine Art Gallery. Suffolk
- 1998 Solo exhibition, Charles Barker BSMG. London

France

- 2020 Solo exhibition, Chapelle du Crusifix. Le Croisic
- 2015 Solo exhibition, Centre Culturel de la Visitation. Périgueux
- 2015 Solo exhibition, Galerie MoreArt tea, Grenoble
- 2009 Joint exhibition, Galerie Eraunsia. Saint-Jean-de-Luz
- 2003 Solo exhibition, Centre Culturel de la Visitation. Périgueux
- 2003 Solo exhibition, Château de Bricquebec - Salle du Chartrier. Bricquebec

Malaysia

- 2014 Solo exhibition & workshop, National Academy of Arts (ASWARA). Kuala Lumpur
- 2014 Joint exhibition, TAPAK Art Gallery. Shah Alam

Ukraine

- 2020 Solo Exhibition, Mandarin Maison, Kyiv
- 2020 Solo Exhibition, VIP Longe Kyiv International Airport. Kyiv
- 2020 Solo Exhibition, History Museum of Kyiv. Kyiv
- 2019 Solo Exhibition, Museum of Eastern and Western Art. Odesa
- 2019 Solo Exhibition, Nathional Theater of Kyiv. Kyiv
- 2019 Solo Exhibition, Plast Art Gallery. Chernihiv

Czech Republic

- 2020 Solo Exhibition, Castle Blátna, Blátna
- 2018 Solo Exhibition, Gallery Gaudeamus, Community Centre. Ostrava
- 2018 Group Exhibition, Municipal Art Gallery and Museum, Hořice
- 2016 Solo Exhibition, Grandhotel Pupp. Karlovy Vary
- 2015 Group Exhibition, The Church of Immaculate Conception of Virgin Mary. Hojsova Stráž
- 2014 Joint exhibition dedicated to the 40th anniversary of diplomatic relations between the Kingdom of Thailand and the Czech Republic. Prague
- Under patronage of the Royal Thai Embassy in Prague
- Společná výstava věnována 40. výročí navázání diplomatických vztahů mezi Thajským Královstvím a Českou republikou. Praha
- Pod záštitou Velvyslanectví Thajského království v Praze
- 2013 Group Exhibition, Malaysian art & Alexandr Onishenko. Prague
- Under patronage of Embassy of Malaysia & Malaysian Cultural Heritage Foundation
- Skupinová výstava, Výstava malajsijského výtvarného umění a Alexandra Onishenka.
- Praha – Pod záštitou Velvyslanectví Malajsie a Fondu malajsijského kulturní ho dědictví
- 2010 Solo exhibition, Liberec City Hall. Liberec – Under patronage of Cultural fond of the city Liberec and the Community center KONTAKT Liberec.
- Samostatná výstava, Liberecká radnice. Liberec – Pod záštitou Kulturního fondu města Liberec a Komunitního střediska KONTAKT Liberec.
- 2007 Group exhibition, Karolinum Art Scene, Charles University. Prague Skupinová výstava, Výtvarná scéna, Karlova Univerzita. Praha
- 2004 Solo exhibition, Carlo IV-Boscolo, Prague Samostatná výstava, Carlo IV-Boscolo, Praha
- 2002 Joint exhibition, After Floods, Exhibition Hall Mánes. Prague Skupinová výstava, Po povodních, Výstavní síň Mánes. Praha
- 2001 Solo exhibition, The castle Konopiště. Konopiště Samostatná výstava, Zámek Konopiště. Konopiště
- 2001 Solo exhibition, Institute of Culture. Plzeň Samostatná výstava, Kulturní Institut. Plzeň
