= Adolf Foehr =

German architect and city planner (1880–1943)

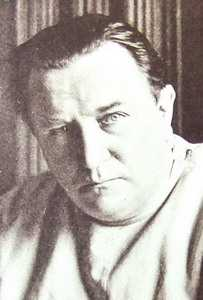
Adolf Foehr (1920s)

Adolf Foehr (20 June 1880, in Nuremberg – 7 October 1943, in Prague) was a Bohemian German architect, city planner, and building supervisor.

== Life and work ==
He grew up in Annaberg-Buchholz, and moved with his parents from there to Prague, while still a boy. He studied at the German Technical University, and at the Academy of Arts, Architecture and Design, with Friedrich Ohmann. From 1899 to 1902, he attended the master classes there; taught by Jan Kotěra. He continued his studies at ETH Zürich, while continuing to take part in exhibitions in Prague. In 1908, he opened his architectural office in the Holešovice district.

His first credited projects are from around 1910; in the Art Nouveau style. Later, he turned to Purism. His buildings are adorned with canopies, risalits and arches. He also made extensive use of materials such as marble, brass and travertine. He often employed three-part windows and triangular floor plans. In the 1930s, he changed styles again; favoring Constructivism.

Overall, he designed more than fifty commercial and residential buildings in Prague; most of which were created for ethnic German companies. This focus often led to his being passed over by Czech organizations. For example, in 1926 he won first place in a competition to design an expansion of the Prague City Council's offices, but his designs were never used.

Despite this, from 1921, he was a technical advisor for the Building Commission and, after 1924, a Building Department official. He was also an active member of the Deutsche Demokratische Freiheitspartei and served on the Prague City Council (1929–1932). Professionally, he was a member of the Sudetendeutsche Akademie der Wissenschaften und Künste, an artistic association known as "Concordia", and Schlaraffia; an international German-speaking society. In 1930, well after Czechoslovakia had become independent, he was awarded the Goldene Ehrenzeichen für Verdienste (Gold Decoration of Honor) by the Republic of Austria.

== Selected buildings ==
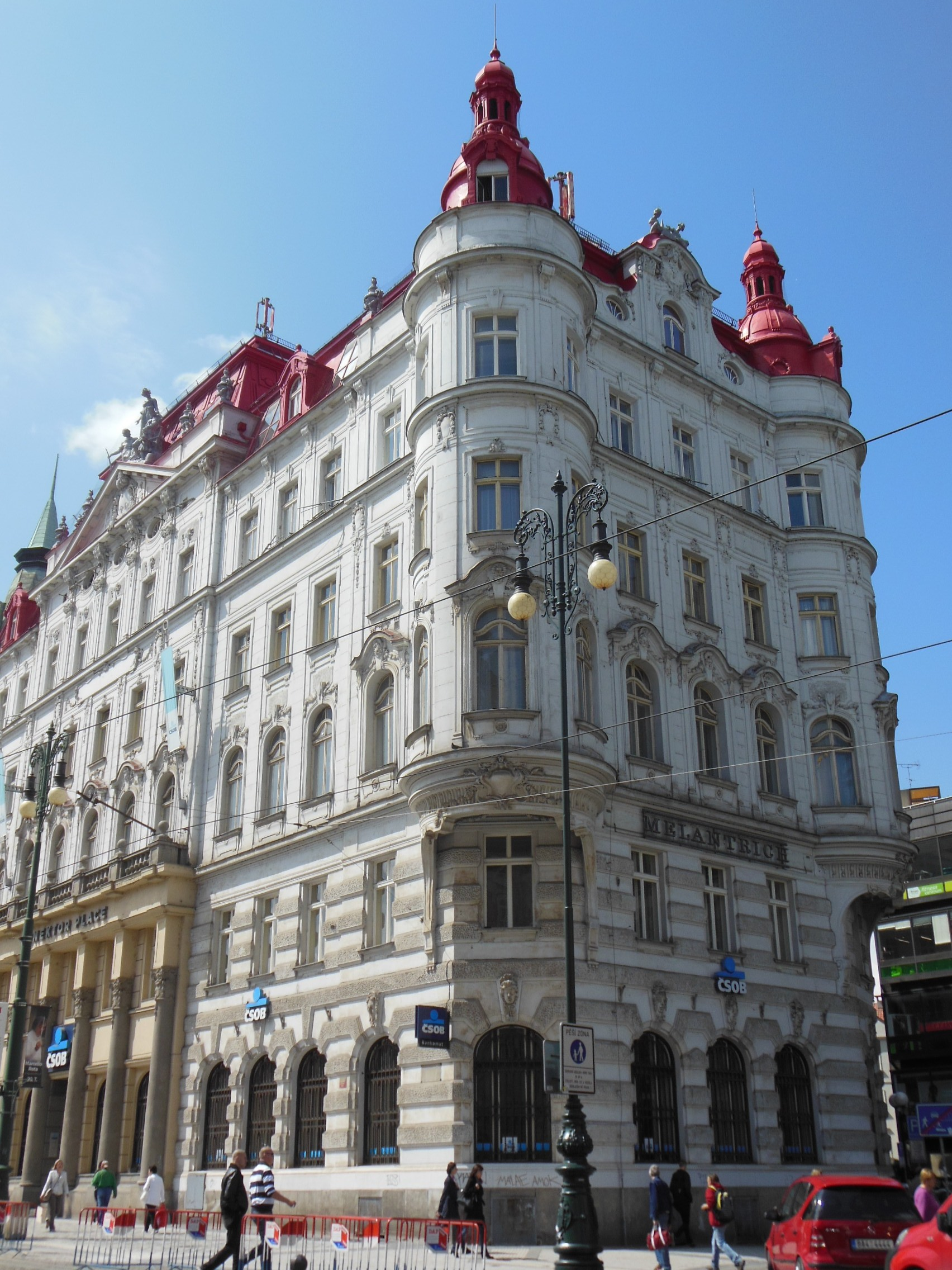
Alliance Bank, Prague

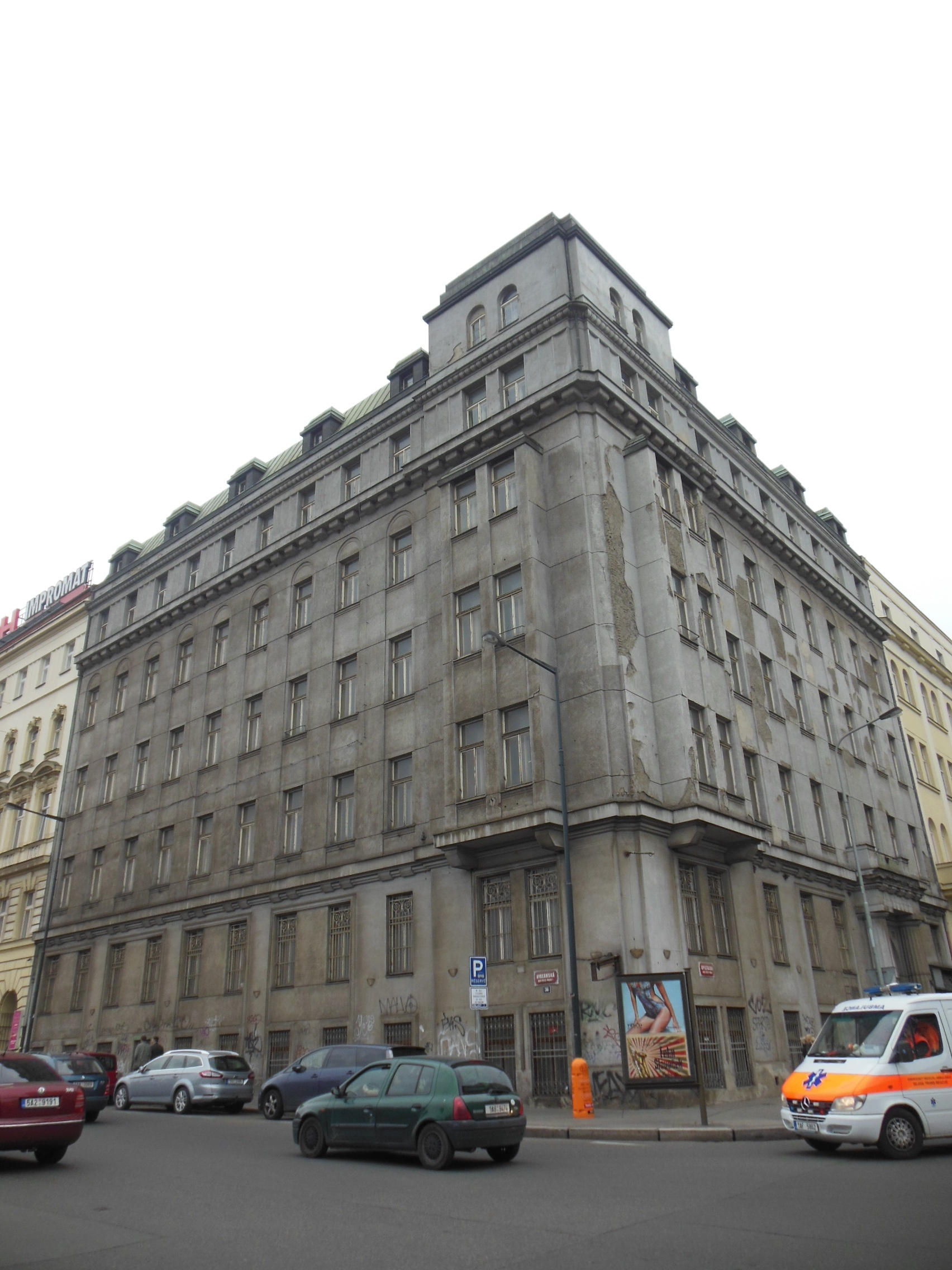
Office building, Prague

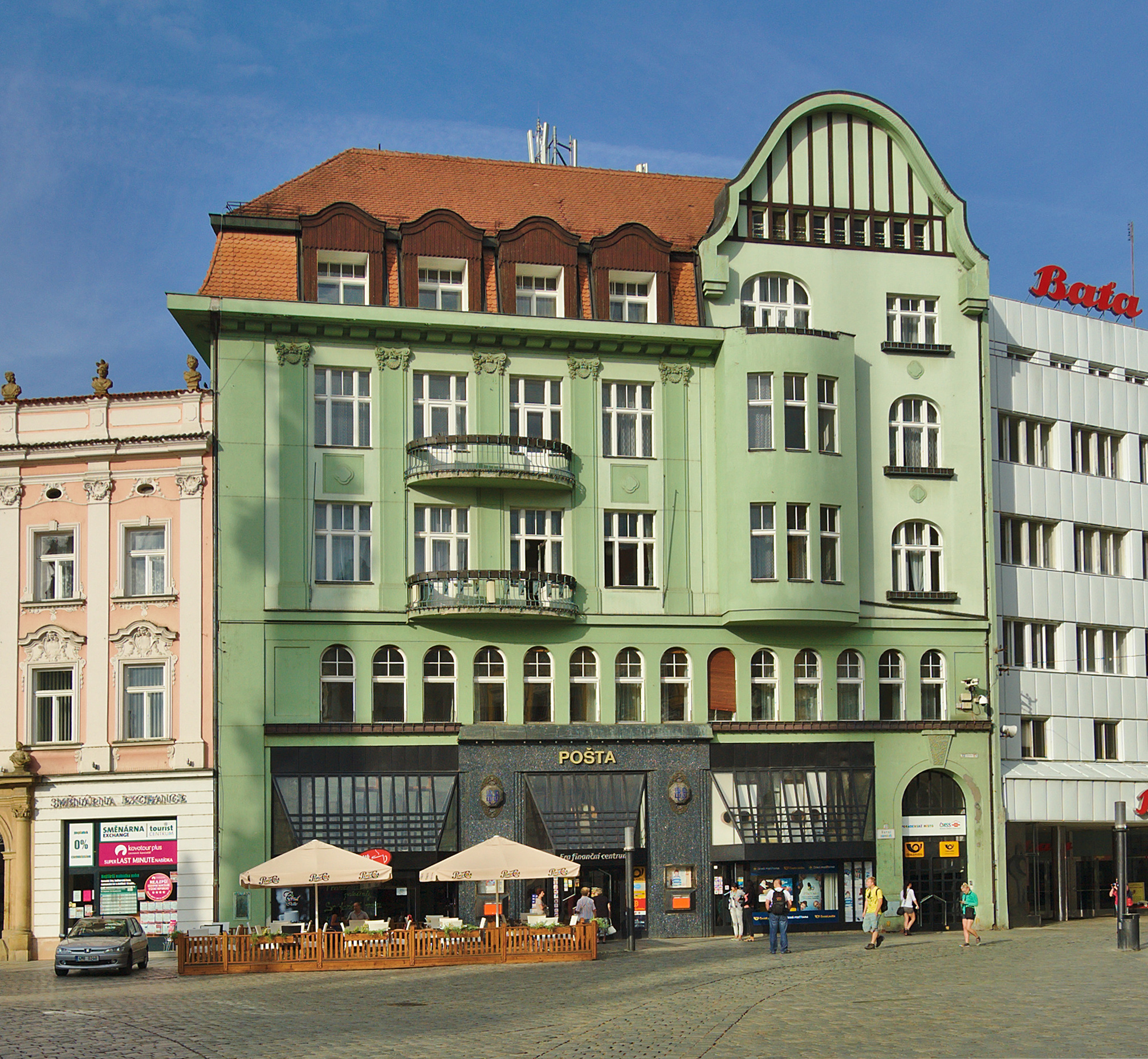
Bohemian Union Bank, Olomouc

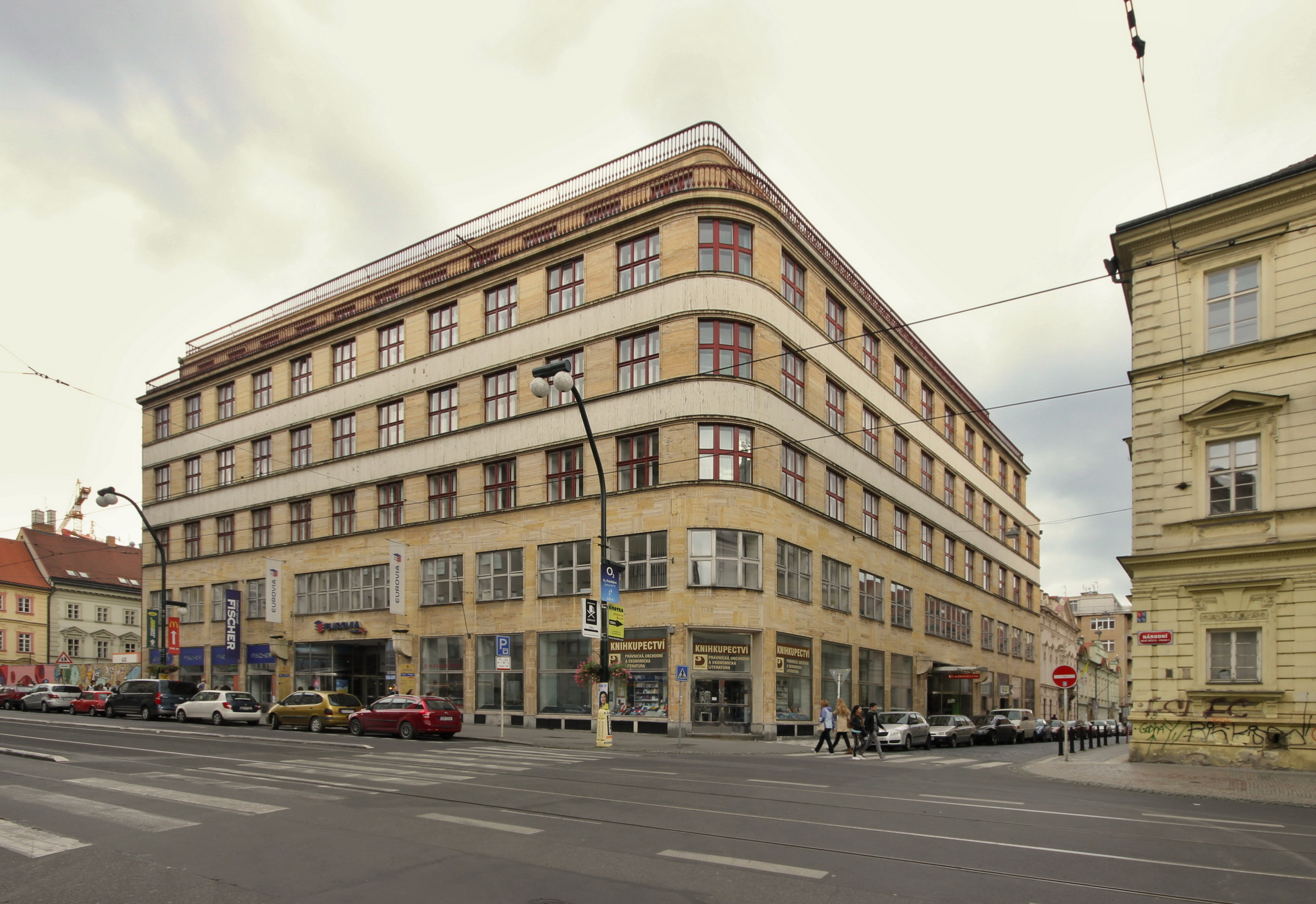
Danube Palace II, Prague

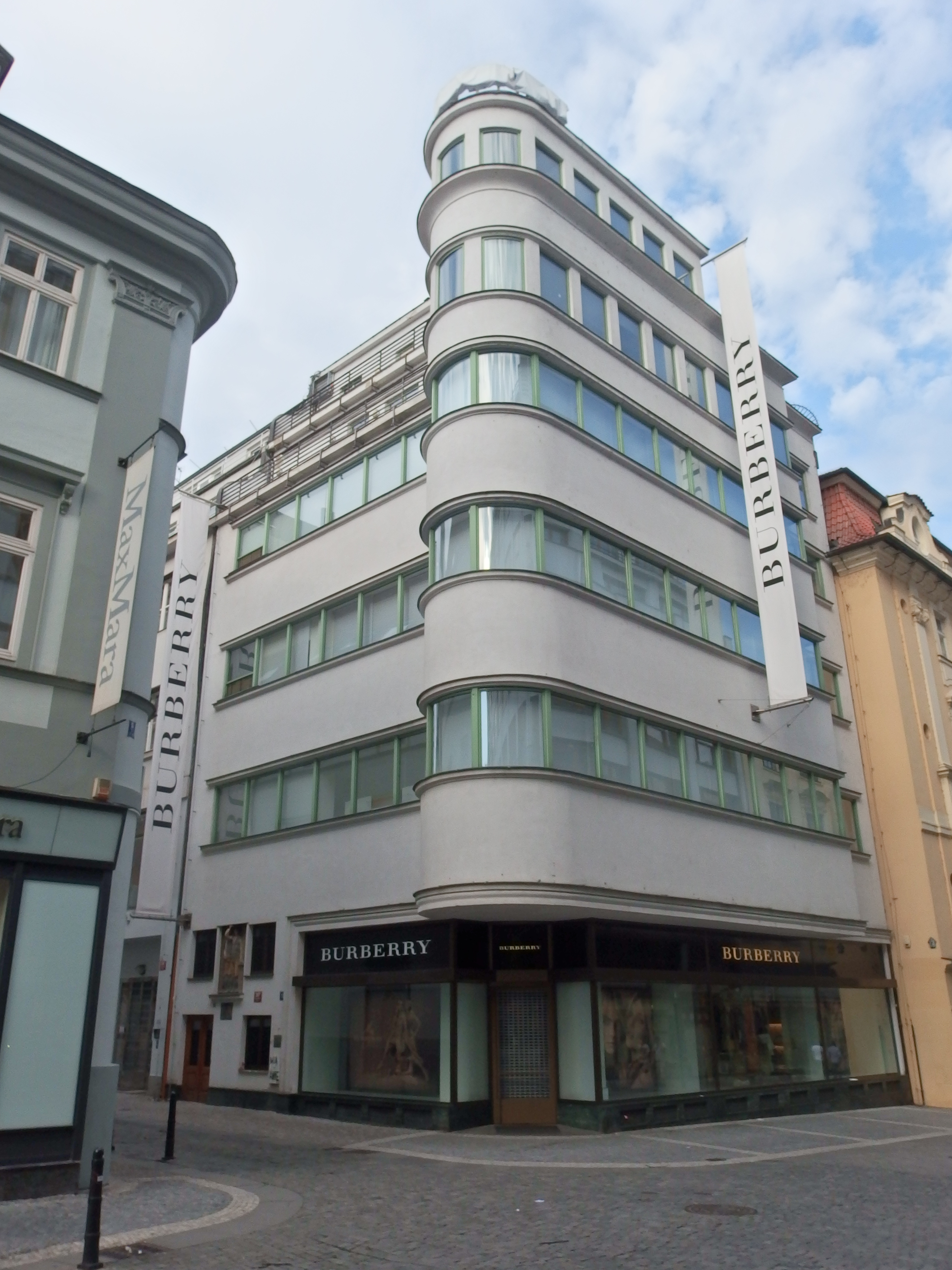
Brandeis Department Store, Prague

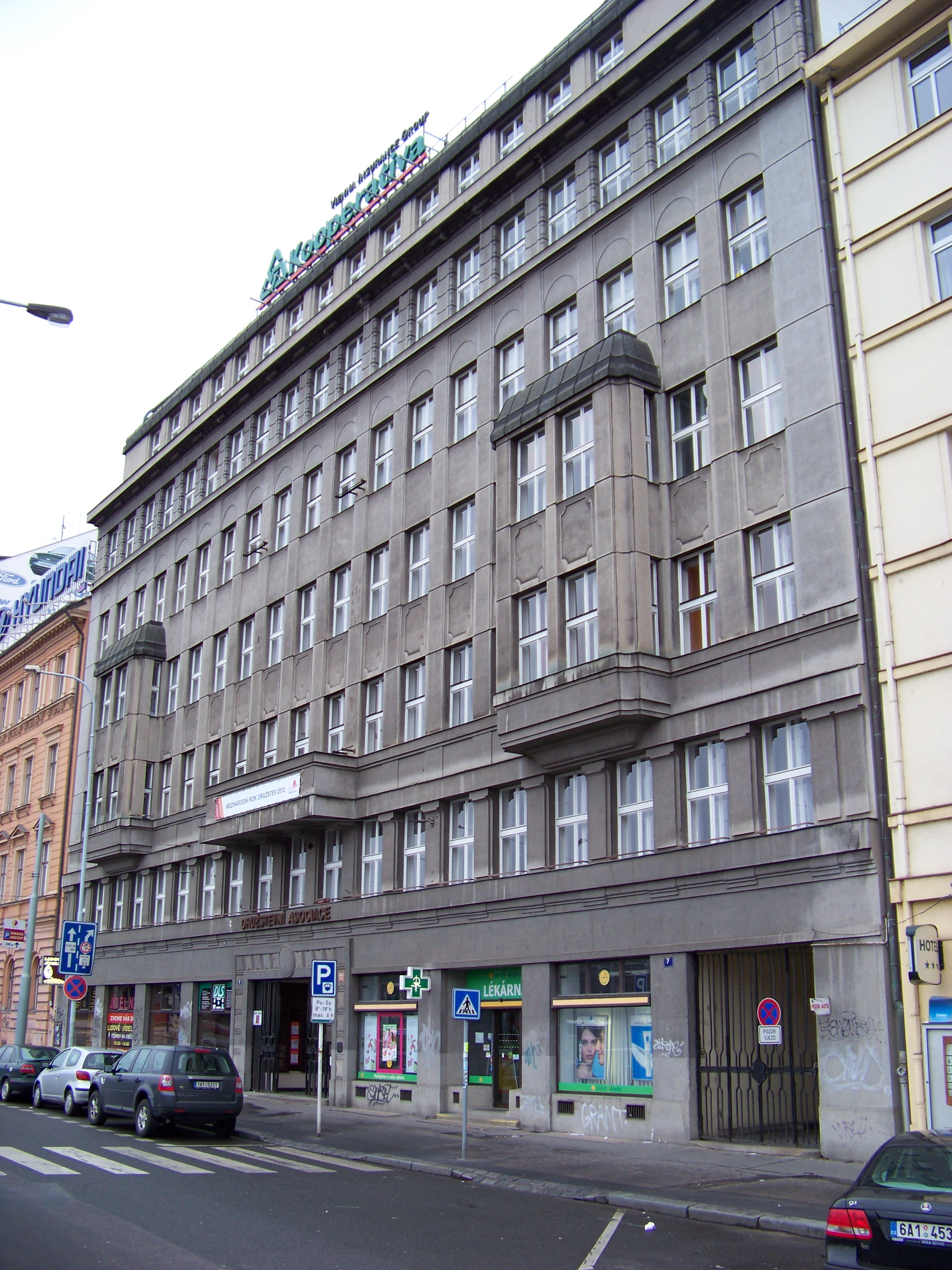
Commercial building, Prague
