= Mezná =

Mezná may refer to places in the Czech Republic:

- Mezná (Pelhřimov District), a municipality and village in the Vysočina Region
- Mezná (Tábor District), a municipality and village in the South Bohemian Region
- Mezná, a village and part of Hřensko in the Ústí nad Labem Region
