= Mezná (Tábor District) =

- Municipality
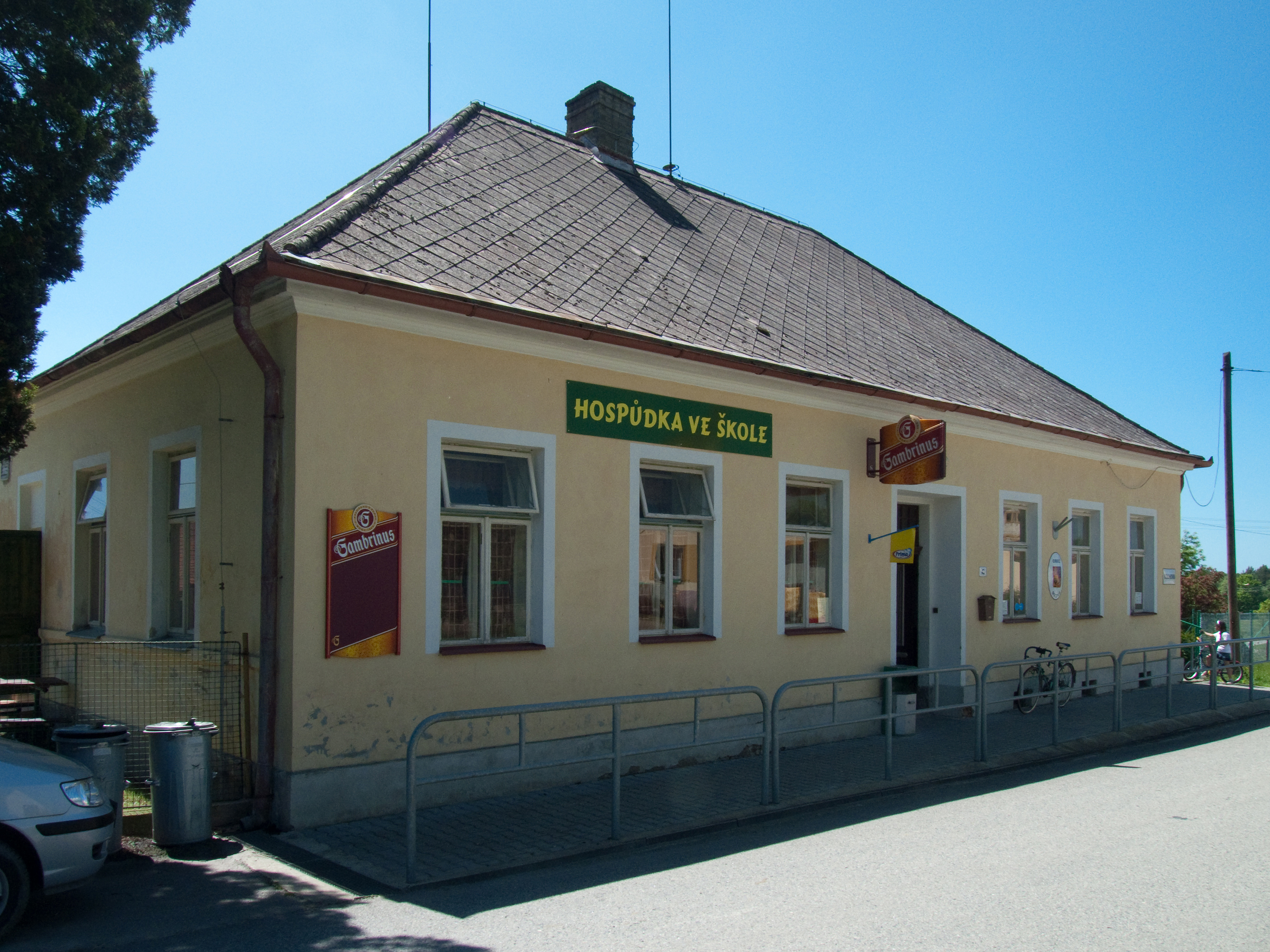
- Municipal office and a pub

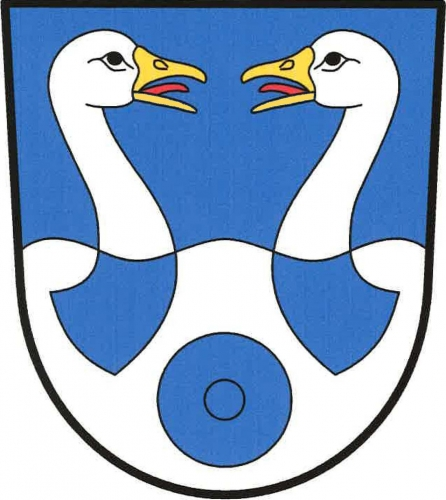
- Flag Coat of arms

- Location in the Czech Republic
- Coordinates: 49°15′30″N 14°48′3″E
- Country: Czech Republic
- Region: South Bohemian
- District: Tábor
- First mentioned: 1362

Area
  - Total: 5.07 km^{2} (1.96 sq mi)
- Elevation: 443 m (1,453 ft)

Population (2026-01-01)
  - Total: 115
  - Density: 22.7/km^{2} (58.7/sq mi)
- Time zone: UTC+1 (CET)
  - Summer (DST): UTC+2 (CEST)
- Postal code: 392 01
- Website: www.obecmezna.cz

Mezná is a municipality and village in Tábor District in the South Bohemian Region of the Czech Republic. It has about 100 inhabitants.

== Etymology ==
The name is an adjective derived from the Czech word mez ('border'). The village was probably founded near the border of some estate.

== Geography ==
Mezná is located about 19 kilometres (12 mi) south of Tábor and 39 km (24 mi) northeast of České Budějovice. It lies in the Křemešník Highlands. The highest point is the hill U Malovce at 466 m (1,529 ft) above sea level. The stream Dírenský potok and its tributary, the Těšínský potok, flow through the municipality. The municipal territory is very rich in fishponds, mostly built on the Těšínský potok.

== History ==
The first written mention of Mezná is from 1362. Until 1650, it was the centre of a small estate. In 1650, Mezná was bought by the Wratislaw of Mitrovice family and annexed to the Dírná estate.

== Demographics ==
Historical population

| Year | Pop. | ±% |
|---|---|---|
| 1869 | 264 | — |
| 1880 | 284 | +7.6% |
| 1890 | 241 | −15.1% |
| 1900 | 246 | +2.1% |
| 1910 | 253 | +2.8% |

| Year | Pop. | ±% |
|---|---|---|
| 1921 | 237 | −6.3% |
| 1930 | 232 | −2.1% |
| 1950 | 200 | −13.8% |
| 1961 | 183 | −8.5% |
| 1970 | 185 | +1.1% |

| Year | Pop. | ±% |
|---|---|---|
| 1980 | 156 | −15.7% |
| 1991 | 122 | −21.8% |
| 2001 | 108 | −11.5% |
| 2011 | 109 | +0.9% |
| 2021 | 105 | −3.7% |

Source: Censuses

== Transport ==
There are no railways or major roads passing through the municipality.

== Sights ==
There are no protected cultural monuments in the municipality.
