= Nové Mitrovice =

- Municipality
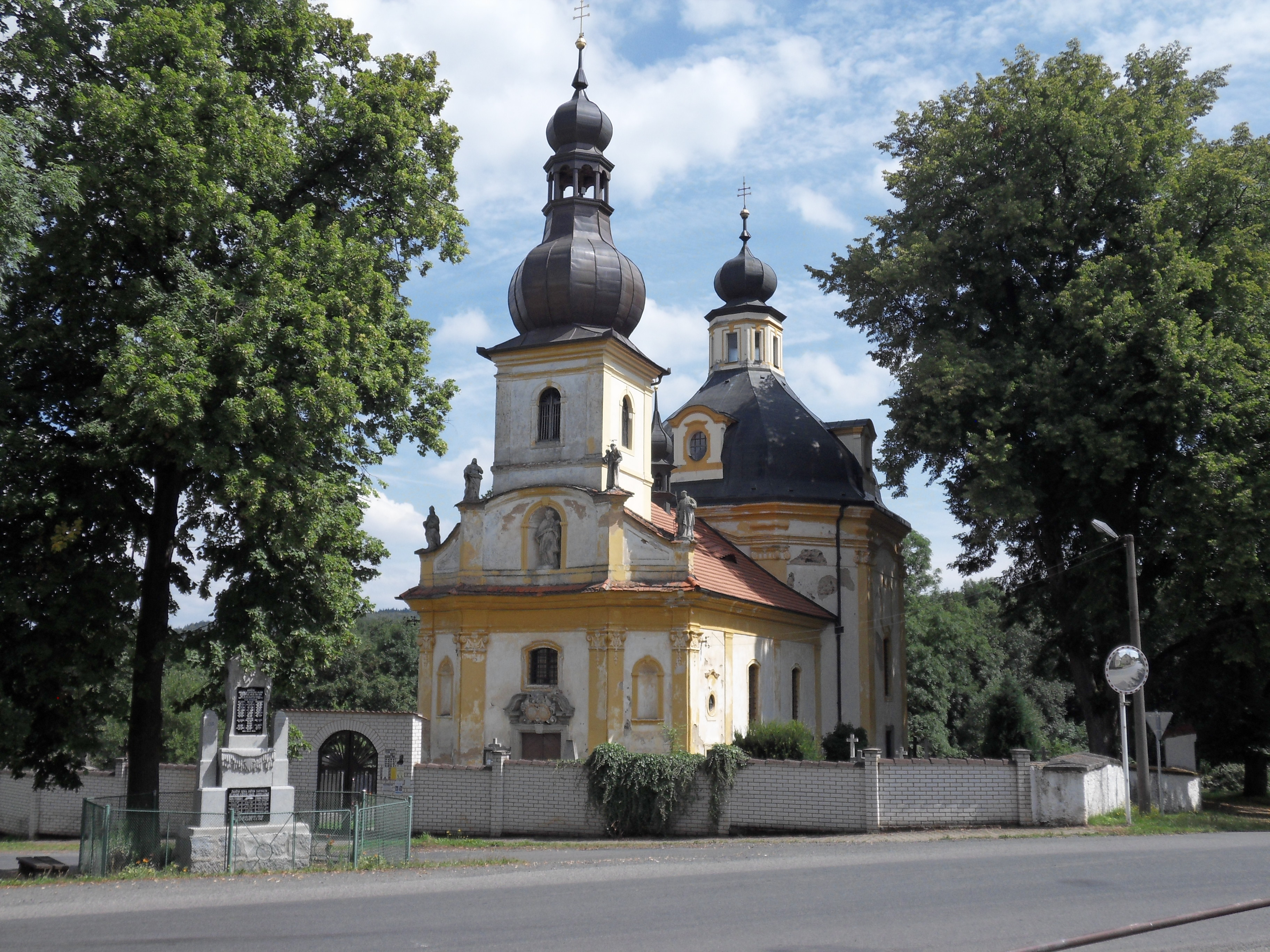
- Church of Saint John of Nepomuk

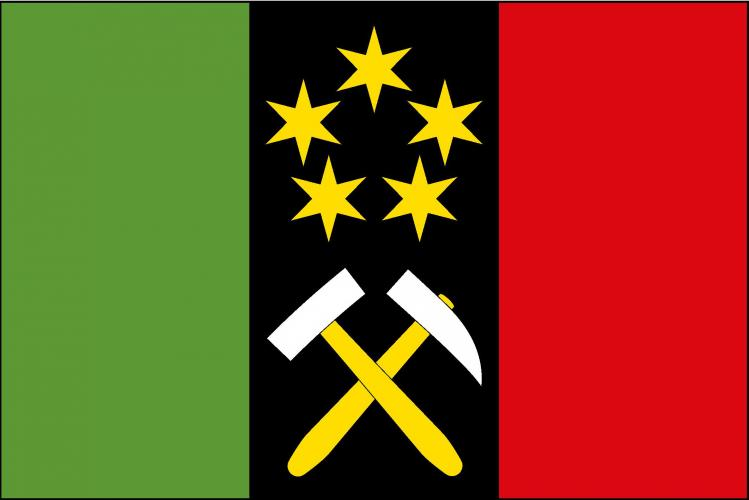
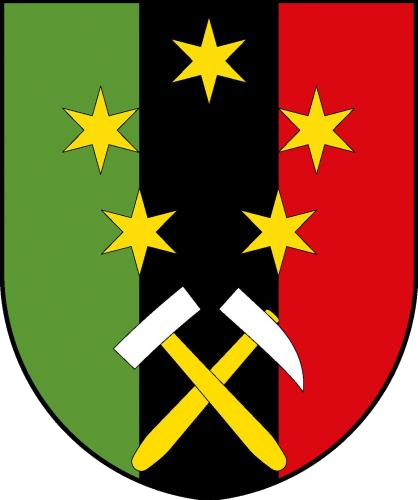
- Flag Coat of arms

- Location in the Czech Republic
- Coordinates: 49°34′47″N 13°41′1″E
- Country: Czech Republic
- Region: Plzeň
- District: Plzeň-South
- First mentioned: 1626

Area
  - Total: 20.91 km^{2} (8.07 sq mi)
- Elevation: 555 m (1,821 ft)

Population (2026-01-01)
  - Total: 360
  - Density: 17/km^{2} (45/sq mi)
- Time zone: UTC+1 (CET)
  - Summer (DST): UTC+2 (CEST)
- Postal code: 335 63
- Website: www.novemitrovice.cz

Nové Mitrovice (German: Neu Mitrowitz) is a municipality and village in Plzeň-South District in the Plzeň Region of the Czech Republic. It has about 400 inhabitants. The folk architecture in the village of Mítov within the municipality is well preserved and is protected as a village monument zone.

== Administrative division ==
Nové Mitrovice consists of four municipal parts (in brackets population according to the 2021 census):

- Nové Mitrovice (218)
- Mítov (73)
- Nechanice (66)
- Planiny (8)

== Etymology ==
Nové Mitrovice was initially called Hutě. In 1708, the name Nové Mitrovice ('new Mitrovice') was mentioned for the first time. The village was renamed after its owners, the noble family of Wratislaw of Mitrovice.

== Geography ==
Nové Mitrovice is located about 26 kilometres (16 mi) southeast of Plzeň. The western part of the municipal territory lies in the Švihov Highlands. The eastern part lies in the Brdy Highlands and includes the highest point of Nové Mitrovice, a contour line at 740 m (2,428 ft) above sea level. A dominant feature of the territory is the hill Kokšín at 684 m (2,244 ft). The stream Mítovský potok flows through the municipality.

== History ==
The first written mention of Nové Mitrovice is from 1626. At that time, it was a small hamlet called Hutě, which consisted of eight cottages and was administered as part of Železný Újezd. From the first half of the 17th century, iron ore was mined in the area. At the end of the 17th century, silver was also mined for a short time. The village was owned by the noble family of Wratislaw of Mitrovice, who renamed it. The family further developed the mining and iron-processing industry, luring many German immigrants.

After World War II, the municipality of Mítov was merged with Nové Mitrovice. Planiny was incorporated in 1921 and Nechanice in 1976.

== Demographics ==
Historical population

Year	Pop.	±%
1869	1,507	—
1880	1,567	+4.0%
1890	1,355	−13.5%
1900	1,293	−4.6%
1910	1,250	−3.3%

Year	Pop.	±%
1921	1,142	−8.6%
1930	1,073	−6.0%
1950	696	−35.1%
1961	680	−2.3%
1970	599	−11.9%

Year	Pop.	±%
1980	391	−34.7%
1991	332	−15.1%
2001	336	+1.2%
2011	322	−4.2%
2021	365	+13.4%

Source: Censuses

== Transport ==
There are no railways or major roads passing through the municipality.

== Sights ==
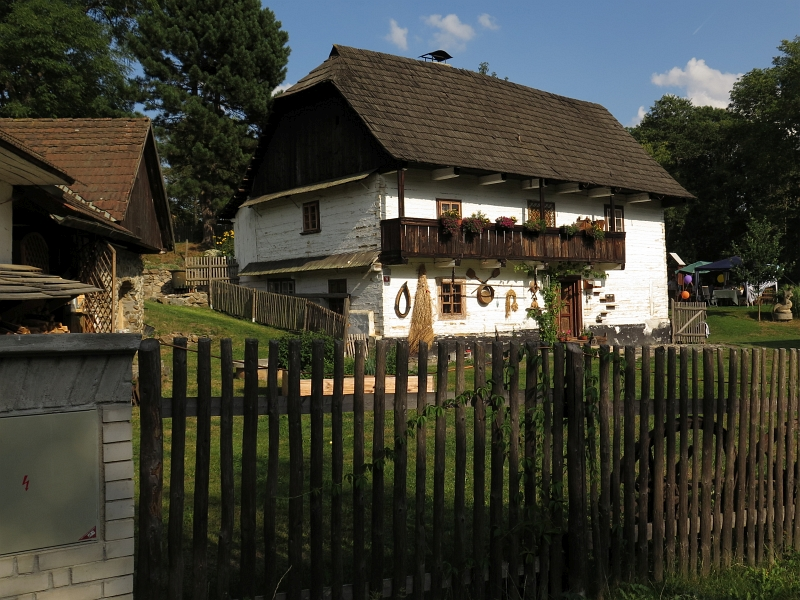
Water mill in Mítov

The main landmark of Nové Mitrovice is the Church of Saint John of Nepomuk. It was built in the Baroque style in 1722–1726. It was most likely designed by Jakub Auguston.

The almost entire village of Mítov is protected as a village monument zone because of its well-preserved folk architecture houses. The village is largely made up of half-timbered houses from the 18th century and the first half of the 19th century, supplemented by brick buildings from the second half of the 19th and early 20th centuries. A notable building is the half-timbered water mill in the lower part of the village.
