= Wratislaw of Mitrovice =

- Czech noble family
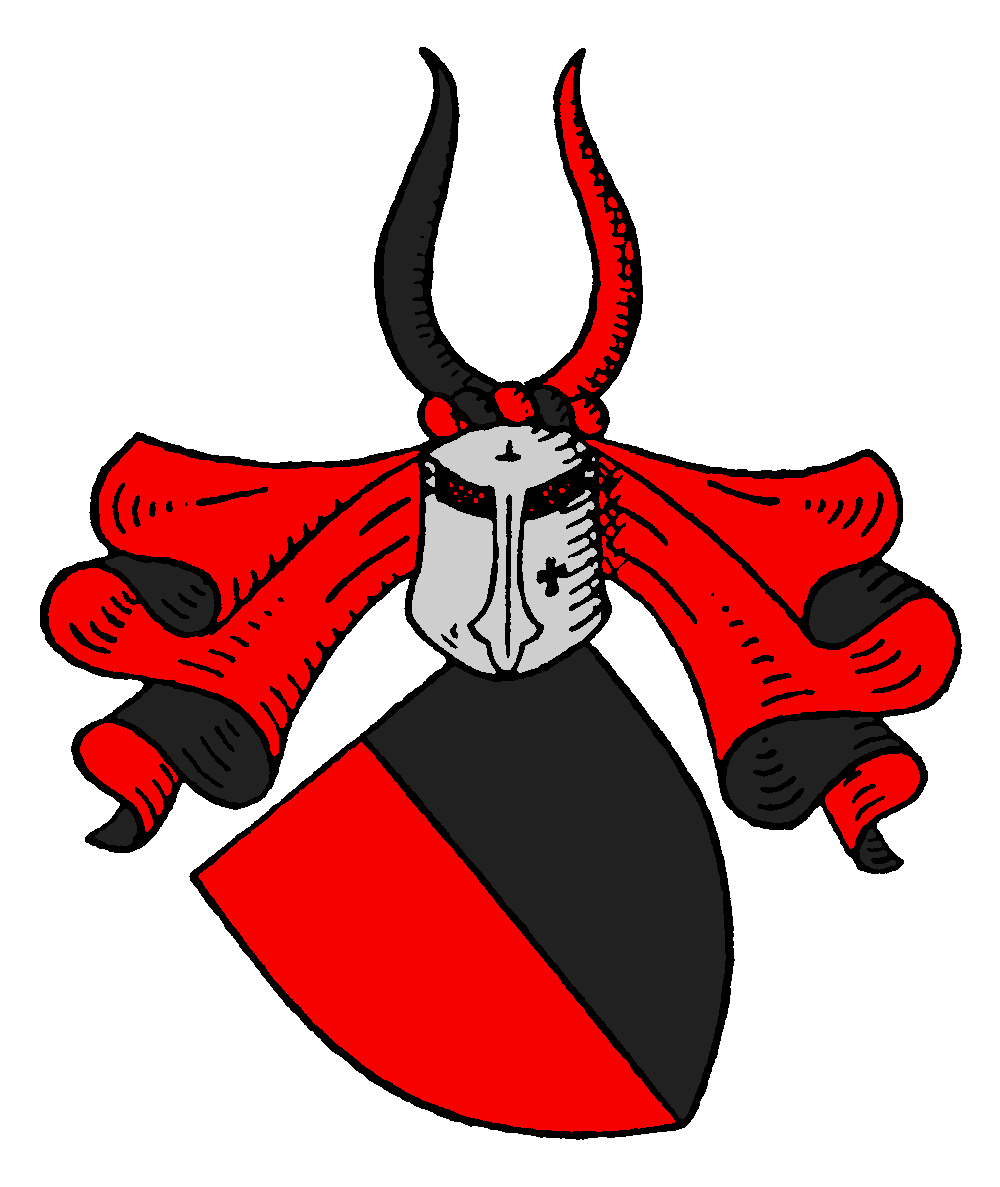
- Current region: Bohemia
- Earlier spellings: Wratislaw z Mitrovicz
- Origin: Mitrovice, Kingdom of Bohemia
- Founded: 1448
- Titles: List: Baron (1629); Count (1646); Imperial Count (1701)
- Estate: Dírná Castle

The Wratislaw of Mitrovice family (Czech: Vratislavové z Mitrovic, German: Wratislaw von Mitrowitz) is a Bohemian noble family. The first mentioned member of the family is Wratislaw, who acquired the estate of Mitrovice in 1448. The family gradually gained significance during the 16th century. In the 17th and 18th century, various family members held a number of offices in state administration and diplomacy as well as in the Catholic church. They also built or rebuilt multiple castles and palaces, including the Wratislaws' palace in Prague.

After the Communist party of Czechoslovakia seized power in 1948, the Wratislaws were forced to give up most of their properties. Part of their family emigrated to New Zealand. The other half of the family from Koloděje nad Lužnicí emigrated to Canada. Only Dírná Castle was returned to them after the Velvet revolution of 1989 and they own it to this day.

== History ==
=== 15th century ===
Wratislaws of Mitrovice are the descendants of Duke Wenceslaus I and Vratislaus II, the first king of Bohemia who ruled in the 11th century. The first documented member of the family is Wratislaw, who bought the estate of Mitrovice in 1448 and thus established the family name Wratislav of Mitrovice. He sided with Oldřich of Hradec in his dispute with king George of Poděbrady, that followed the imprisonment of Oldřich's father. Despite this, he later became the burgrave of the Prague Castle. His son John later held the court office of Master of the Hunt.

=== 16th and first half of 17th century ===
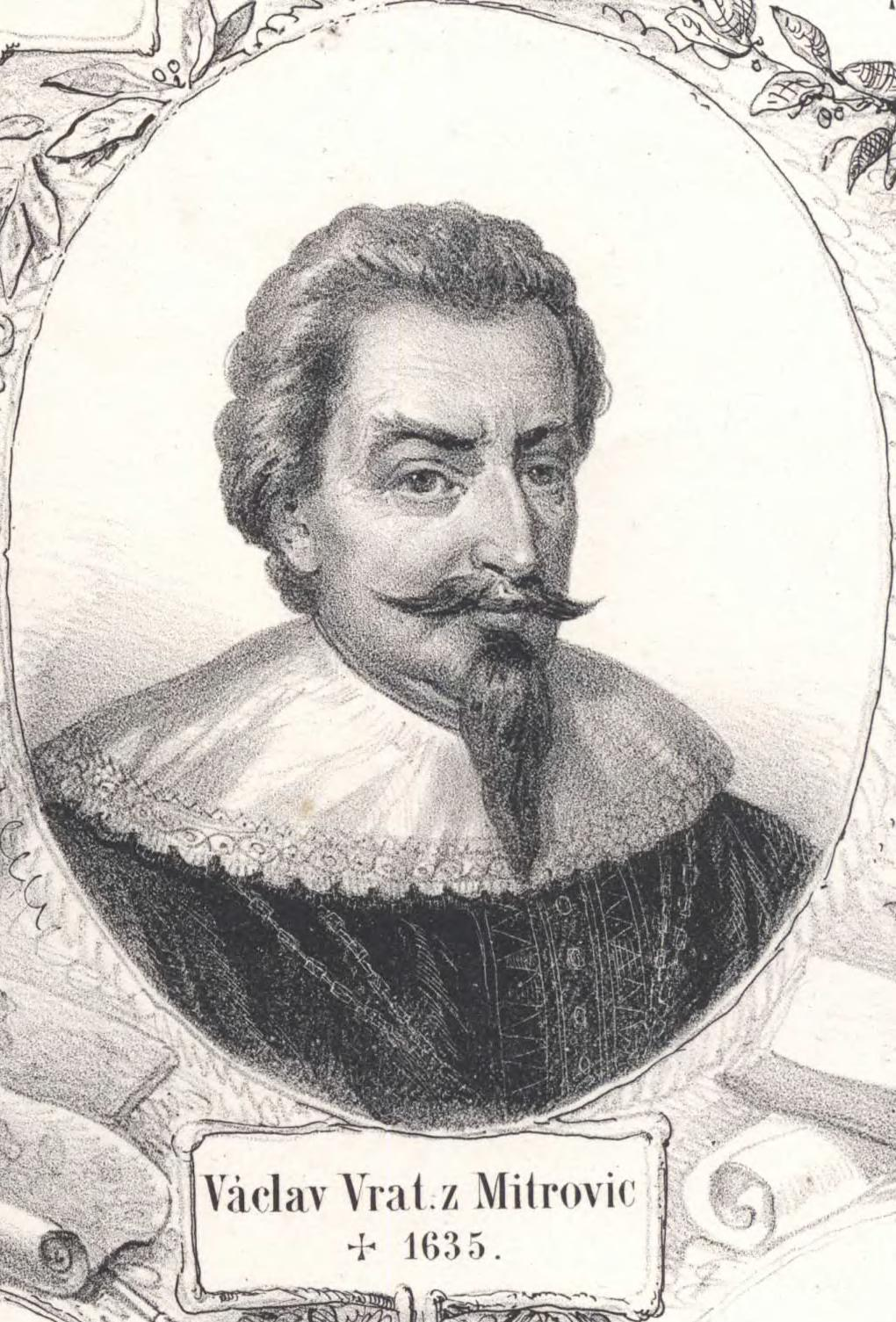
Václav Wratislaw of Mitrovice (19th century litography)

Next notable member of the family was Wenceslaus, who as a young man accompanied the diplomatic mission of the Emperor Rudolf II to Istanbul in 1591. In response to increased hostilities along the Habsburg–Ottoman border and the diplomatic fallout, all participants of the diplomatic mission were imprisoned and later – when the Long Turkish War broke out – sent to be galley slaves. After he was set free, Václav wrote his famous work Adventures of Baron Václav Wratislaw of Mitrowice: What He Saw in the Turkish Metropolis, Constantinopole, Experienced in His Captivity, and After His Happy Return to His Country, Committed to Writing in the Year of Our Lord 1599. The book was first printed in 1777 and soon after that translated to German, English and Russian. It became the most read work of the Czech renaissance literature. Wenceslaus and his relative William Wratislaw of Mitrovice – member of the Knights Hospitaler – also fought for the Habsburg side during the war with Ottomans. During the Bohemian Revolt – started in 1618 – a majority of the family stayed loyal to the Holy Roman Emperor. Thanks to that they escaped the fate of many other Czech noble families who lost their possessions following the Battle of the White Mountain. Wratislaws of Mitrovice remained involved with the Order of Knights Hospitaler, brothers Adam and Francis even became consecutive grand priors of the Bohemian branch of the order. Denis Francis fought for the Spanish king and – after his return – served as Steward of the Plzeň County.

=== Second half of 17th and 18th century ===
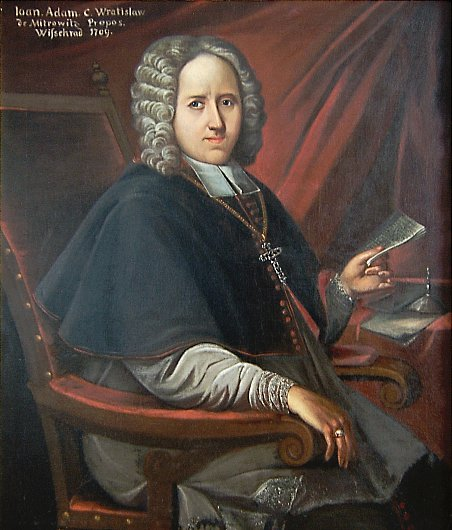
Jan Adam Wratislaw of Mitrovice

Another notable member – Jan Václav – was an imperial diplomat, operating primarily in England. He was appointed Chancellor of the Kingdom of Bohemia in 1705 and served till his death 6 years later. Jan Adam chose a church career. He was first Bishop of Hradec Králové, then Bishop of Litoměřice. His younger brother John Joseph was later appointed Bishop of Hradec Králové as well. He built a brand new baroque castle he called Nové Mitrovice. The family also owned the Wratislaw palace (Vratislavský palác) in Prague quarter Malá Strana and multiple other castles and estates. It was at this time – at the start of the 18th century – that the Wratislaws of Mitrovice reached the peak of their wealth and power.

=== 19th and 20th century and present times ===
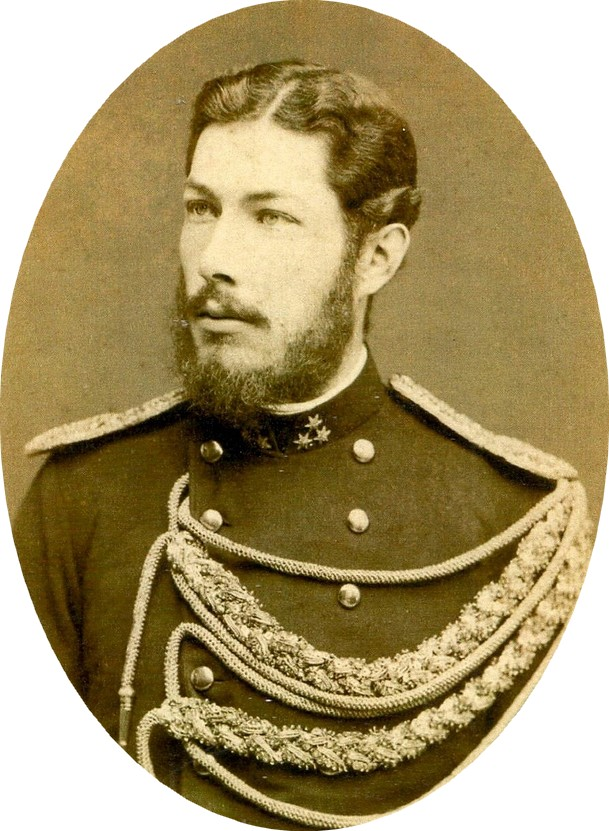
Count Eugen II Wratislaw of Mitrovice

In the 19th century, the Wratislaw von Mitrowitz's became supporters of the Czech National Revival. Count Joseph Wratislaw von Mitrowitz, Supreme Marshal of the Kingdom of Bohemia at the time, was an important patron of the National Museum. Eugen II was the chairman of National Theatre Society and member of Parliament of the Kingdom of Bohemia.

William Ferdinand Wratislaw – descendant of a Czech emigrant to England – came back to Bohemia to prove his descendancy from the noble family of Wratislaws of Mitrovice, but was unable to find a firm proof. Nonetheless, he and his son Albert Wratislaw were Czech patriots and the latter went on to translate and popularize many Czech literary works in the English speaking world.
At the start of the 20th century, only two branches of the family remained. One lived at the Dírná Castle and Myslkovice Castle, the other at Koloděje nad Lužnicí Castle. In 1938, Wratislaws of Mitrovice co-signed the Declaration of Czech nobility and thereby confirmed their allegiance to Czechoslovak government. As a result they faced prosecution during the Nazi occupation of Czechoslovakia. In 1948, after the Communist Party of Czechoslovakia took power, they lost all of their properties. Part of the family fled persecution to New Zealand. The 31-year-old Count Maximilian Joseph decided to stay. He worked as a woodcutter and a tractor driver. After the Velvet Revolution, the Count – aged 72 – was given back the Dírná Castle and the Wratislaws of Mitrovice live there to this day.

== Notable family members ==
- Václav Wratislaw of Mitrovice (1576–1635), diplomat, author of Adventures of Baron Václav Wratislaw of Mitrovice – a popular account of his experiences during his diplomatic visit and subsequent captivity in the Ottoman Empire
- Jan Václav Wratislaw of Mitrovice (c. 1670 – 1712), diplomat, Chancellor of Kingdom of Bohemia
- Jan Adam Wratislaw of Mitrovice (1677–1730), Bishop of Hradec Králové, later Bishop of Litoměřice
- Jan Joseph Wratislaw of Mitrovice (1694–1753), Bishop of Hradec Králové
- Josef Wratislaw of Mitrovice, (1764–1830) Supreme Marshal of the Kingdom of Bohemia
- Eugen Wratislaw of Mitrovice (1786–1867), Field Marshall of the Austrian Army
- Eugen II Wratislaw of Mitrovice (1842–1895), Member of Parliament of the Kingdom of Bohemia
- Ludmila Marie Juliana Wratislavova z Mitrovic a Schoenfeld Representative Czech Embassy Canada
- Jilji Wratislav von Mitrowitz und Schoenfeld (1930-2006), Military Police Czech Army, Intelligence Officer US Army
- Alena-Francis Wratislavova von Mitrowitz und Schoenfeld (1975-), diplomat,
- Edward Paul Lilly III Wratislav von Mitrowitz und Schoenfeld (1964-), Sergeant Major

United States Marine Corp

== Notable castles in possession ==
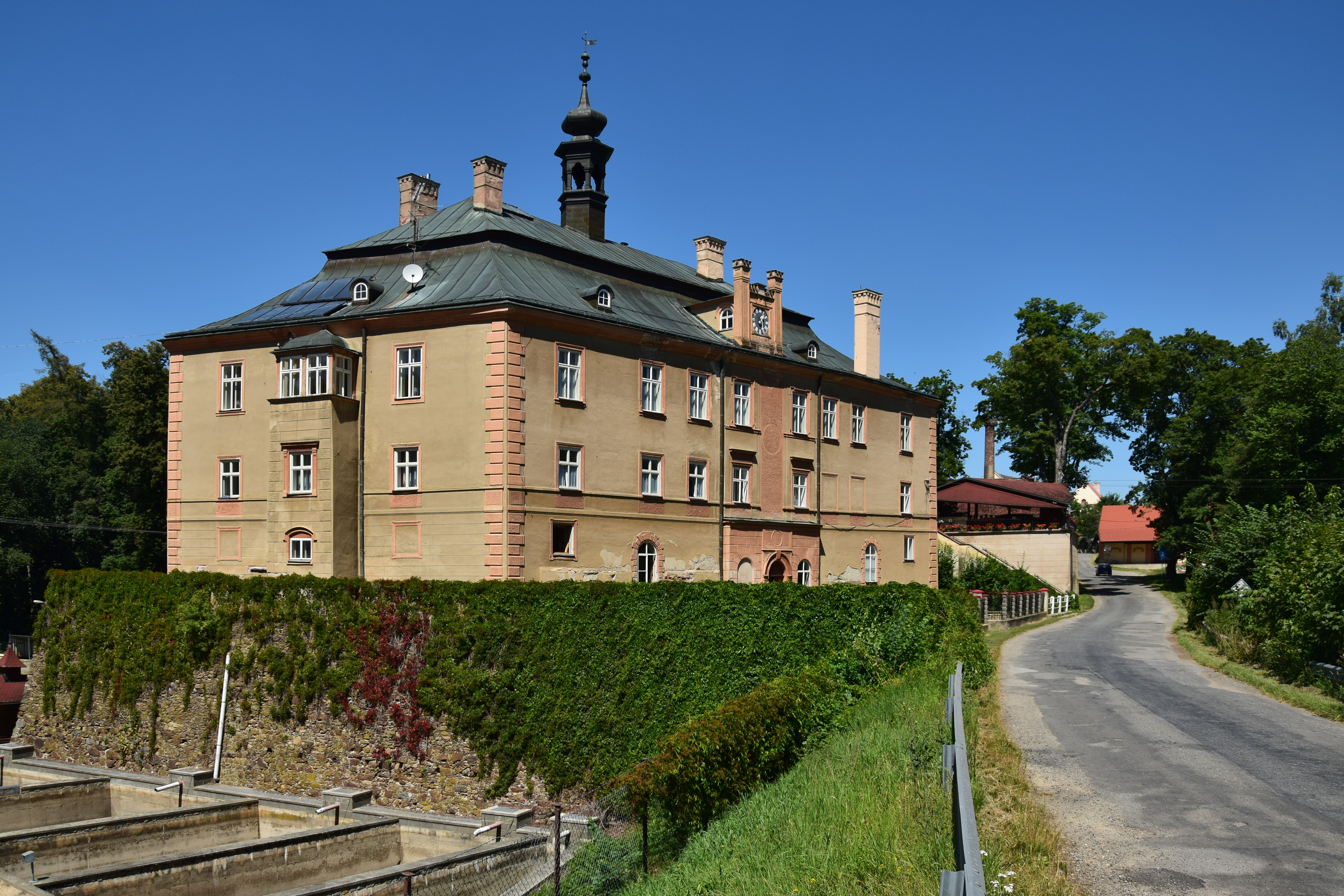
Dírná Castle

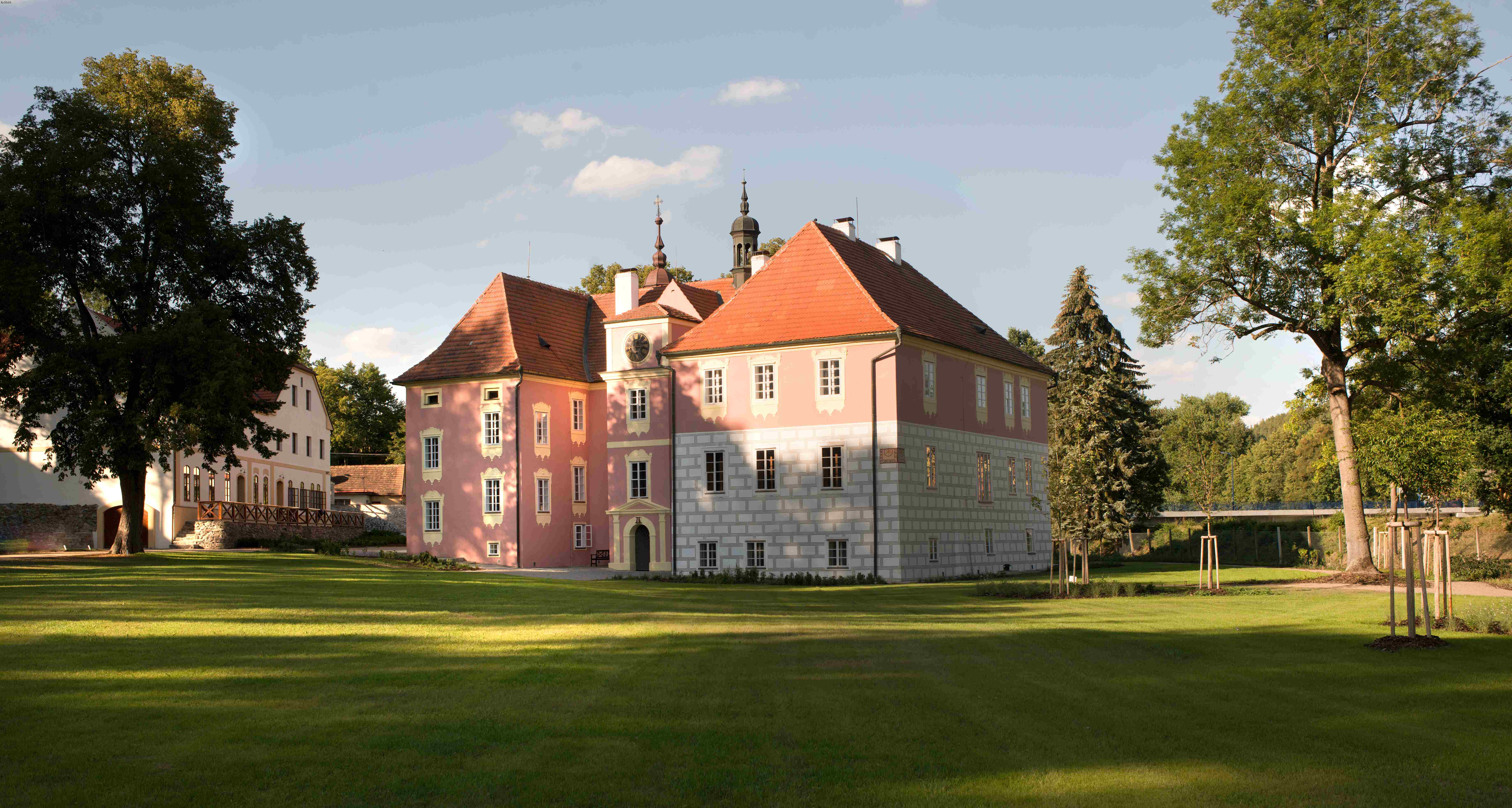
Koloděje nad Lužnicí Castle

- Liteň Castle (1571–1648, 1728–1782)
- Protivín Castle (1598–1679)
- Dírná Castle (1623–1948, 1990–today)
- Lojovice Castle (1627–1646)
- New Mitrovice Castle (1670–1685, 1724–1804)
- Wratislaws' Palace, Prague (1671–1861)
- Koloděje nad Lužnicí Castle (1737–?)
- Kost Castle (1779–1867)
- Čimelice Castle (1782–1823)
- Votice Castle (1807–1872)
- Vrchotovy Janovice Castle (1807–1879)
- Tochovice Castle (1815–1840)
- Chotýšany Castle (1830-1872)
- Radvanov Castle (1771-1797)
- Osov Castle (1590-1601, 1645-1677)
