= Dírná =

- Municipality
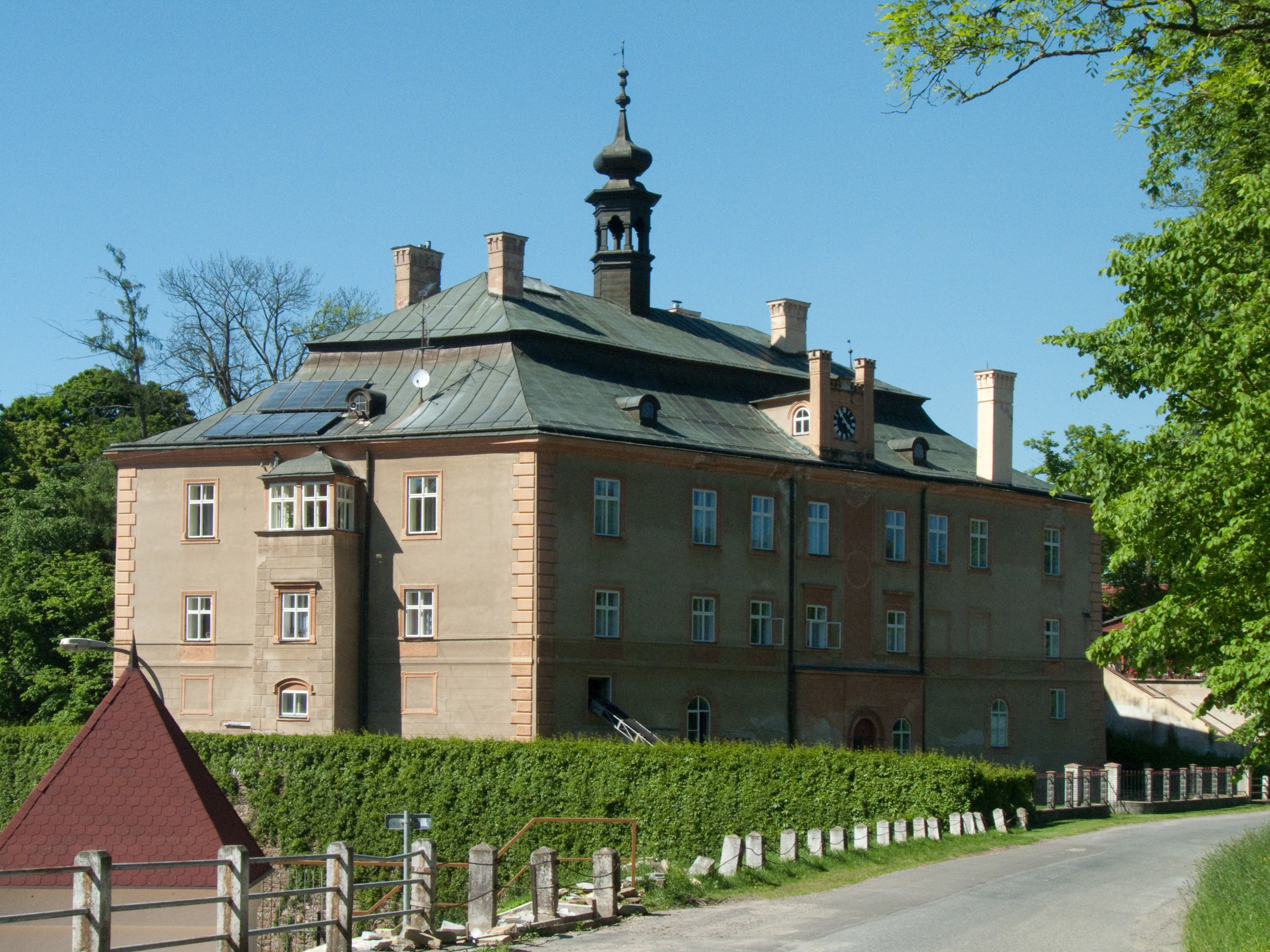
- Dírná Castle

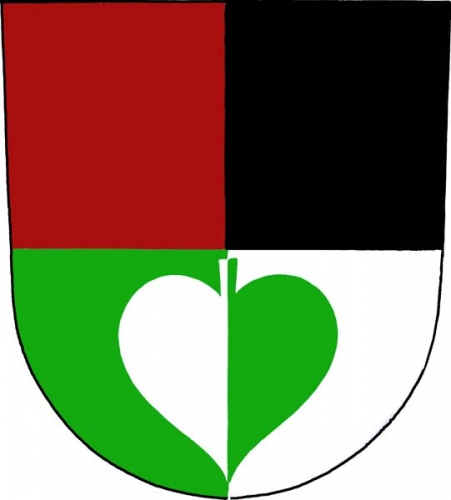
- Flag Coat of arms

- Location in the Czech Republic
- Coordinates: 49°14′35″N 14°50′41″E
- Country: Czech Republic
- Region: South Bohemian
- District: Tábor
- First mentioned: 1340

Area
  - Total: 21.98 km^{2} (8.49 sq mi)
- Elevation: 469 m (1,539 ft)

Population (2026-01-01)
  - Total: 427
  - Density: 19.4/km^{2} (50.3/sq mi)
- Time zone: UTC+1 (CET)
  - Summer (DST): UTC+2 (CEST)
- Postal codes: 391 27, 392 01
- Website: www.obecdirna.cz

Dírná is a municipality and village in Tábor District in the South Bohemian Region of the Czech Republic. It has about 400 inhabitants.

Dírná lies approximately 24 kilometres (15 mi) south-east of Tábor, 41 km (25 mi) north-east of České Budějovice, and 99 km (62 mi) south of Prague.

== Administrative division ==
Dírná consists of five municipal parts (in brackets population according to the 2021 census):

- Dírná (210)
- Lžín (99)
- Nová Ves (25)
- Záříčí (28)
- Závsí (24)

== Demographics ==
Historical population
Year	Pop.	±%
1869	1,380	—
1880	1,444	+4.6%
1890	1,333	−7.7%
1900	1,278	−4.1%
1910	1,318	+3.1%
1921	1,230	−6.7%
1930	1,151	−6.4%
1950	854	−25.8%
1961	854	+0.0%
1970	682	−20.1%
1980	557	−18.3%
1991	499	−10.4%
2001	472	−5.4%
2011	406	−14.0%
2021	386	−4.9%
Source: Censuses
