= Voděrady =

Voděrady may refer to places in the Czech Republic:

- Voděrady (Blansko District), a municipality and village in the South Moravian Region
- Voděrady (Rychnov nad Kněžnou District), a municipality and village in the Hradec Králové Region
- Voděrady (Ústí nad Orlicí District), a municipality and village in the Pardubice Region
- Voděrady, a village and part of Bílence in the Ústí nad Labem Region
- Voděrady, a hamlet and part of Chyšky in the South Bohemian Region
- Voděrady, a village and part of Frýdštejn in the Liberec Region
- Voděrady, a village and part of Luštěnice in the Central Bohemian Region

== See also ==
- Voderady, a municipality and village in Slovakia
