= Sloupnice =

- Municipality
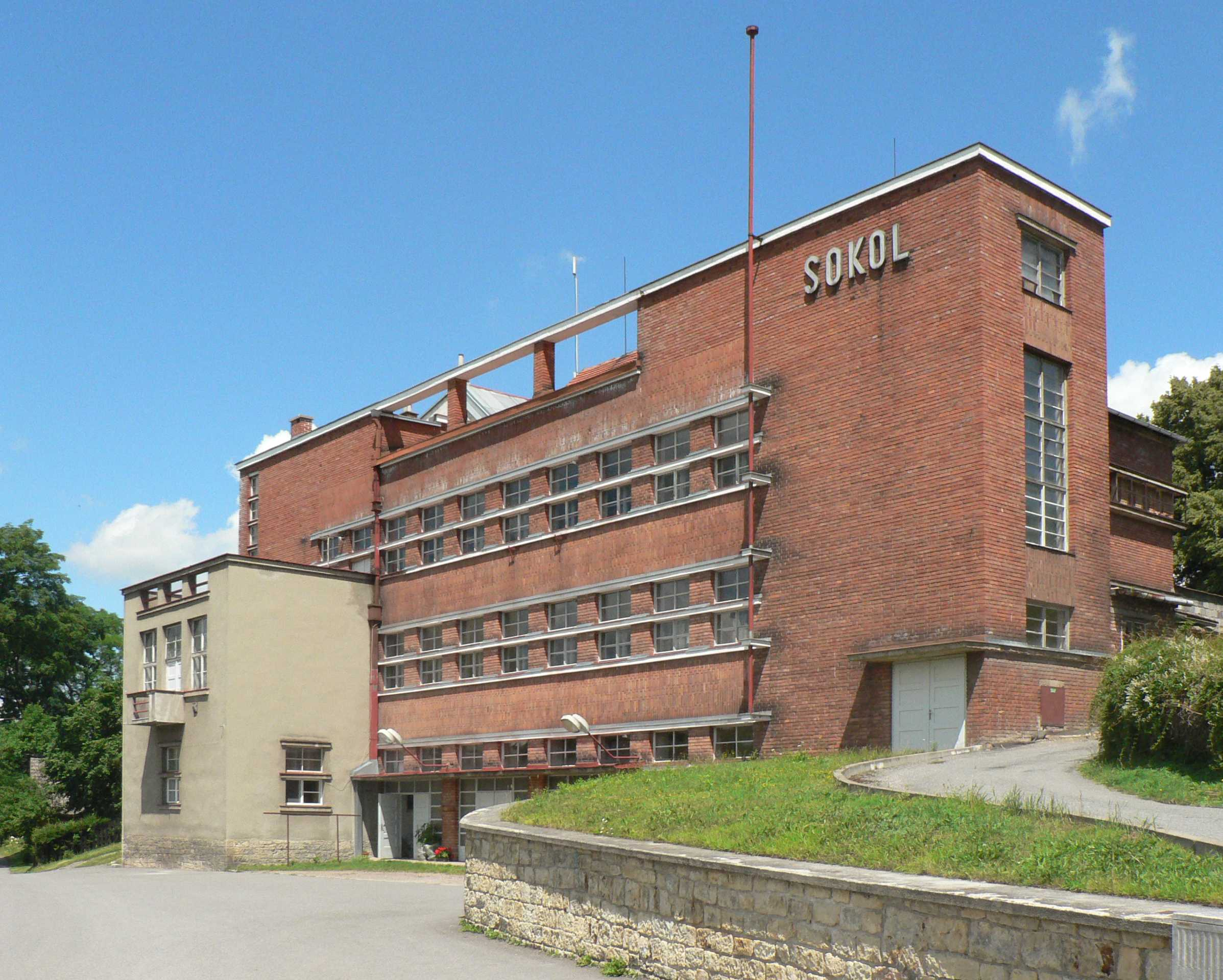
- Sokol Hall

- Flag Coat of arms

- Location in the Czech Republic
- Coordinates: 49°55′17″N 16°20′22″E
- Country: Czech Republic
- Region: Pardubice
- District: Svitavy
- First mentioned: 1292

Area
  - Total: 27.92 km^{2} (10.78 sq mi)
- Elevation: 390 m (1,280 ft)

Population (2026-01-01)
  - Total: 1,829
  - Density: 65.51/km^{2} (169.7/sq mi)
- Time zone: UTC+1 (CET)
  - Summer (DST): UTC+2 (CEST)
- Postal code: 565 53
- Website: www.sloupnice.cz

Sloupnice is a municipality and village in Svitavy District in the Pardubice Region of the Czech Republic. It has about 1,800 inhabitants.

== Administrative division ==
Sloupnice consists of four municipal parts (in brackets population according to the 2021 census):

- Dolní Sloupnice (635)
- Horní Sloupnice (1,070)
- Končiny 1.díl (10)
- Končiny 2.díl (2)

== Etymology ==
The name Sloupnice has been transferred from the name of the eponymous local stream, mentioned first in 1167. The stream's name probably originates from the word slup, used for a basket used in fishery. The name Končiny (from konec, i.e. 'end') referred to a place located on the edge of the village away from its centre.

== Geography ==
Sloupnice is located about 20 kilometres (12 mi) north of Svitavy and 38 km (24 mi) southeast of Pardubice. It lies in the Svitavy Uplands. The highest point is the hill Řetová at 557 m (1,827 ft) above sea level.

Dolní Sloupnice and Horní Sloupnice form a linear village around the stream Sloupnický potok, along the east-west road connecting the towns Ústí nad Orlicí and Vysoké Mýto.

== History ==
Sloupnice was founded during the colonisation of this area in the second half of the 13th century. The first written mention of Sloupnice is from 1292, when it was donated to Zbraslav Monastery by King Wenceslaus II. However, the donation was probably cancelled and in the early 14th century, the nobleman Vítek of Švábenice was documented as the owner. At the beginning of the 16th century, Sloupnice was acquired by Jan Kostka of Postupice, who annexed it to the Brandýs estate.

From 1621 until the declaration of the Patent of Toleration in 1781, non-Catholic religious practice was banned in Bohemia. In 1783, the evangelical community, having survived in secret, was established openly in Sloupnice. Services were first held in nearby Džbánov, but the evangelical church in Dolní Sloupnice was built in 1795.

From 1572, the large village was divided into two village parts (Horní – 'upper' and Dolní – 'lower') for administrative purposes. In 1924, the two parts became two separate municipalities, but in 1976, they were merged again.

From 1 January 2007, Sloupnice is no longer a part of Ústí nad Orlicí District and belongs to Svitavy District.

== Demographics ==
Historical population

Year	Pop.	±%
1869	2,995	—
1880	2,977	−0.6%
1890	2,799	−6.0%
1900	2,849	+1.8%
1910	2,770	−2.8%

Year	Pop.	±%
1921	2,677	−3.4%
1930	2,520	−5.9%
1950	2,040	−19.0%
1961	2,116	+3.7%
1970	1,954	−7.7%

Year	Pop.	±%
1980	1,859	−4.9%
1991	1,683	−9.5%
2001	1,782	+5.9%
2011	1,707	−4.2%
2021	1,717	+0.6%

Source: Censuses

== Transport ==
There are no railways or major roads passing through the municipality.

== Sights ==
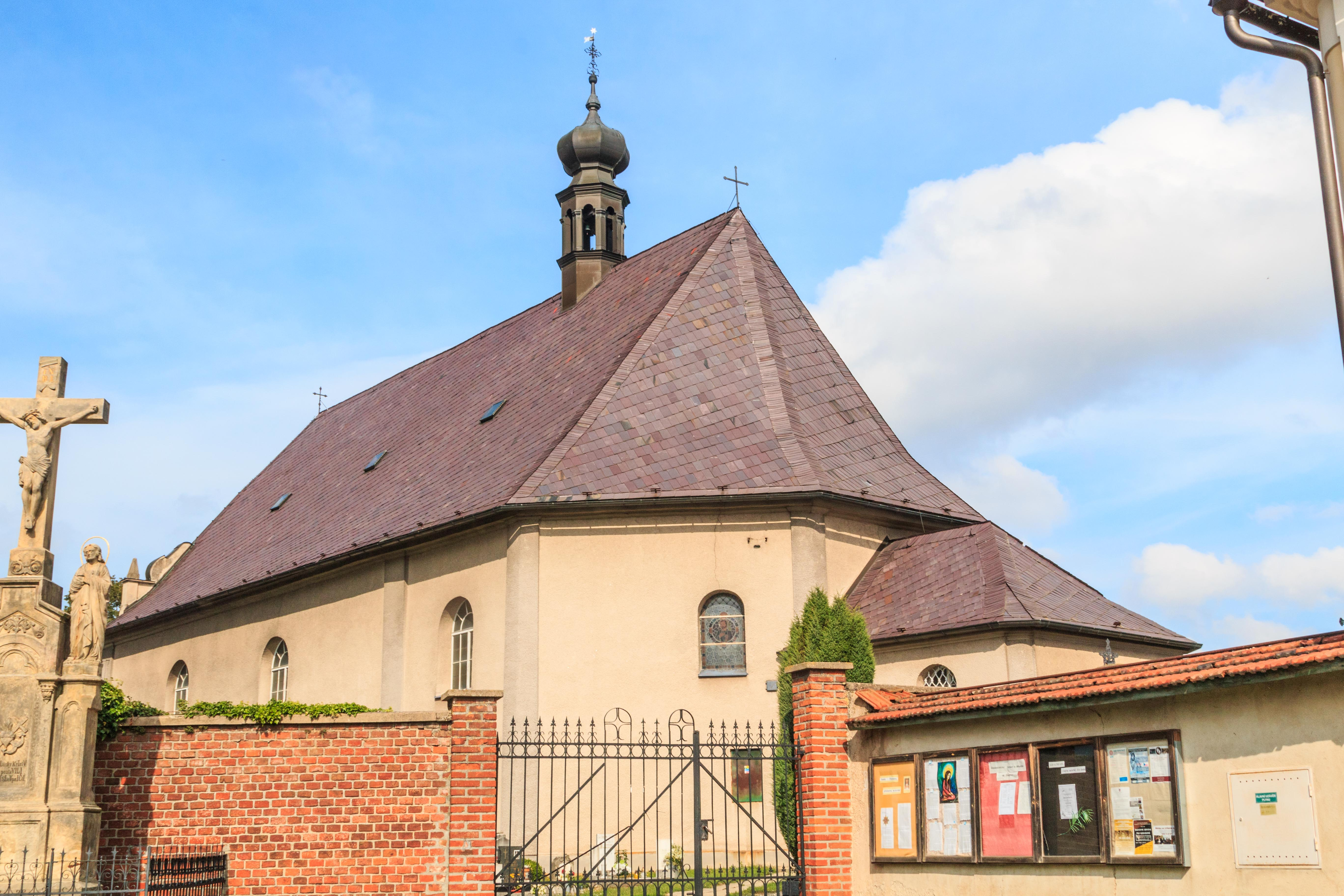
Church of Saint Nicholas

The main landmark of Horní Sloupnice is the Church of Saint Nicholas. It was originally a Gothic church, first mentioned in 1350 and rebuilt into its current Baroque form in 1712.

A landmark is the evangelical church in Dolní Sloupnice, built in 1795. It also still serves its original purpose.
