= Bučina =

Bučina may refer to places in the Czech Republic:

- Bučina (Ústí nad Orlicí District), a municipality and village in the Pardubice Region
- Bučina, an extinct village and administrative part of Kvilda in the South Bohemian Region
- Bučina, a hamlet and administrative part of Vranov (Benešov District) in the Central Bohemian Region
