= Anna Chlebounová =

Czech politician (1875–1946)

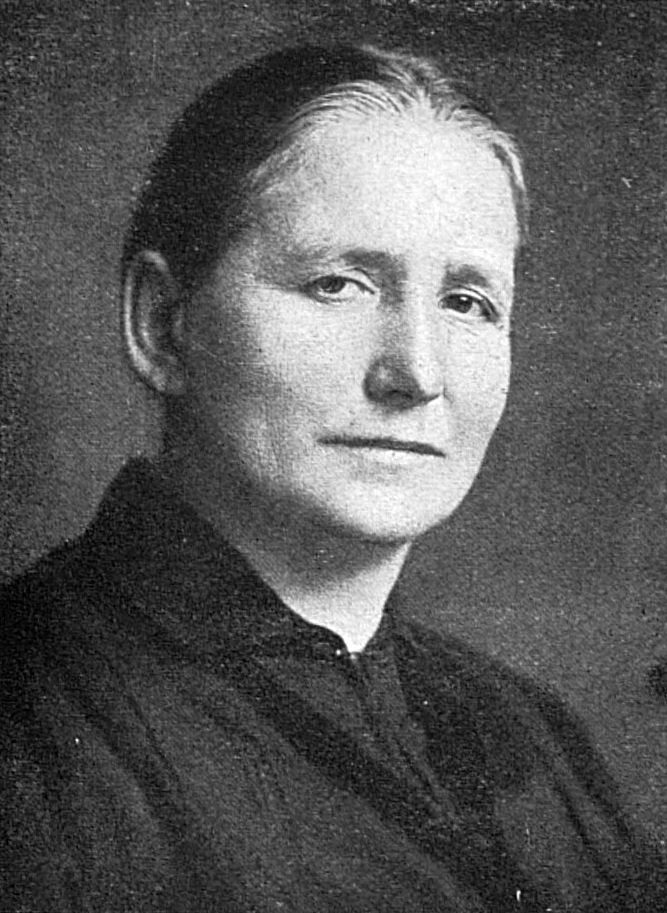

Member of the Senate
- In office 1929–1935

Member of the Chamber of Deputies
- In office 1920–1929

Personal details
- Born: 8 December 1875 Bučina, Bohemia, Austria-Hungary
- Died: 14 March 1946 (aged 70) Džbánov, Czechoslovakia
- Party: Republican Party of Farmers and Peasants

Anna Chlebounová (8 December 1875 – 14 March 1946) was a Czech politician. In 1920, she was one of the first group of women elected to the Chamber of Deputies of Czechoslovakia, remaining in parliament until 1935.

== Biography ==
Chlebounová was born Anna Burešová in Bučina in 1875. She had an elder sister called Filomena, who her mother had given birth to while unmarried. Her mother was a Catholic and converted to Evangelicalism on her marriage in 1871, which angered her family.

Chlebounová wanted to train as a teacher, but following her father's death in 1889, the family did not have the financial resources to allow her to study. Her mother sold the family farm and she was sent to live with her uncle for three years, where she spent evenings reading in his extensive library. In 1894, she married Josef Chleboun, who owned a farm in Džbánov. He was elected mayor of the village in 1899 and Chlebounová subsequently assisted him in the running of the village, using a stamp of his signature to approve decisions. The couple had seven children, one of whom died as a child. Their son Miroslav took over the farm in 1924.

Following the independence of Czechoslovakia at the end of World War I, Chlebounová was a member of the Revolutionary National Assembly from 1918 to 1920 for the Republican Party of Farmers and Peasants (Agrarian Party). In 1920 she was a candidate for the party (now renamed the Republican Party of the Czechoslovak Countryside) for the Chamber of Deputies in the parliamentary elections, and was one of sixteen women elected to parliament. She continued to wear a headscarf, which she saw a symbol of rural women. With parliamentarians having the right to first class rail travel, her presence in the first class carriage was regularly challenged by people not realising she was a member of the Chamber of Deputies. She was re-elected to the Chamber of Deputies in 1925 and was then elected to the Senate in 1929, serving until 1935, when she retired for health reasons.

Chlebounová died in Džbánov in 1946.
