= Bučina (Ústí nad Orlicí District) =

- Municipality
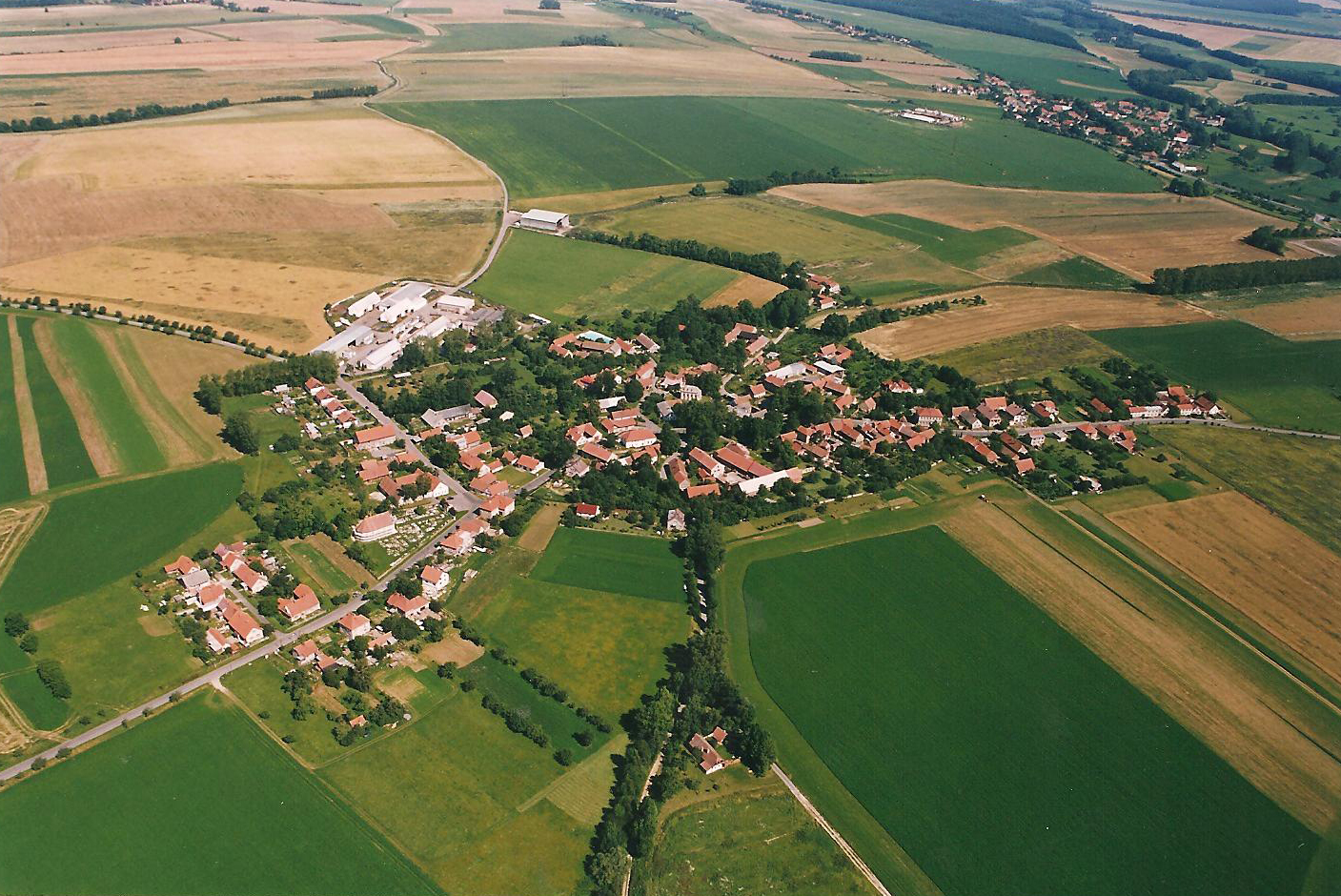
- Aerial view

- Flag Coat of arms

- Location in the Czech Republic
- Coordinates: 49°53′49″N 16°11′34″E
- Country: Czech Republic
- Region: Pardubice
- District: Ústí nad Orlicí
- First mentioned: 1167

Area
  - Total: 3.83 km^{2} (1.48 sq mi)
- Elevation: 324 m (1,063 ft)

Population (2026-01-01)
  - Total: 252
  - Density: 65.8/km^{2} (170/sq mi)
- Time zone: UTC+1 (CET)
  - Summer (DST): UTC+2 (CEST)
- Postal code: 565 55
- Website: www.obecbucina.cz

Bučina is a municipality and village in Ústí nad Orlicí District in the Pardubice Region of the Czech Republic. It has about 300 inhabitants.

== Etymology ==
The Czech word bučina means 'beech forest'. The settlement was established on or near the site of such forest.

== Geography ==
Bučina is located about 17 kilometres (11 mi) southwest of Ústí nad Orlicí and 32 km (20 mi) southeast of Pardubice. It lies in the Svitavy Uplands. The highest point is at 394 m (1,293 ft) above sea level.

== History ==
The first written mention of Bučina is from 1167, when King Vladislaus II donated the village to the monastery in Litomyšl. In the mid-13th century, Bučina was shortly owned by a local noble family, but then it was acquired by the Litomyšl bishopric. In the 15th century, Bučina was bought by the Kostka of Posutpice family. From that time until the establishment of an independent municipality in 1850, Bučina was a part of the Litomyšl estate.

== Demographics ==
Historical population

Year	Pop.	±%
1869	344	—
1880	382	+11.0%
1890	435	+13.9%
1900	415	−4.6%
1910	511	+23.1%

Year	Pop.	±%
1921	466	−8.8%
1930	439	−5.8%
1950	326	−25.7%
1961	297	−8.9%
1970	280	−5.7%

Year	Pop.	±%
1980	273	−2.5%
1991	239	−12.5%
2001	216	−9.6%
2011	208	−3.7%
2021	241	+15.9%

Source: Censuses

== Transport ==
There are no railways or major roads passing through the municipality.

== Sights ==
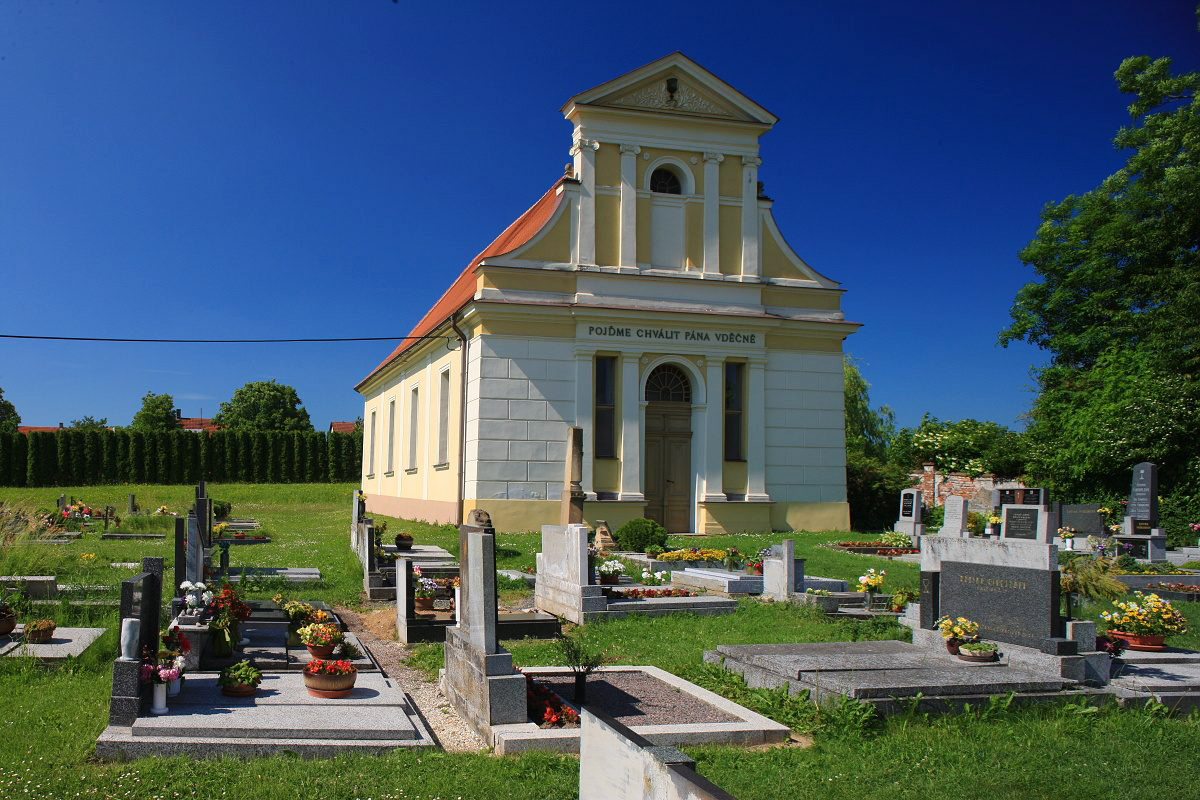
Evangelical church

The most important monument is the Evangelical church. It was built in the Neoclassical and Neo-Renaissance styles in the 1780s. The façade dates from 1883.

The main landmark of the centre of Bučina is the Church of Saint James the Great. It was first mentioned in 1375. The church was completely destroyed by fires in the mid-16th century and in 1872. The current Neo-Gothic building dates from 1887.

== Notable people ==
- Anna Chlebounová (1875–1946), politician
