= Voděrady (Blansko District) =

- Municipality
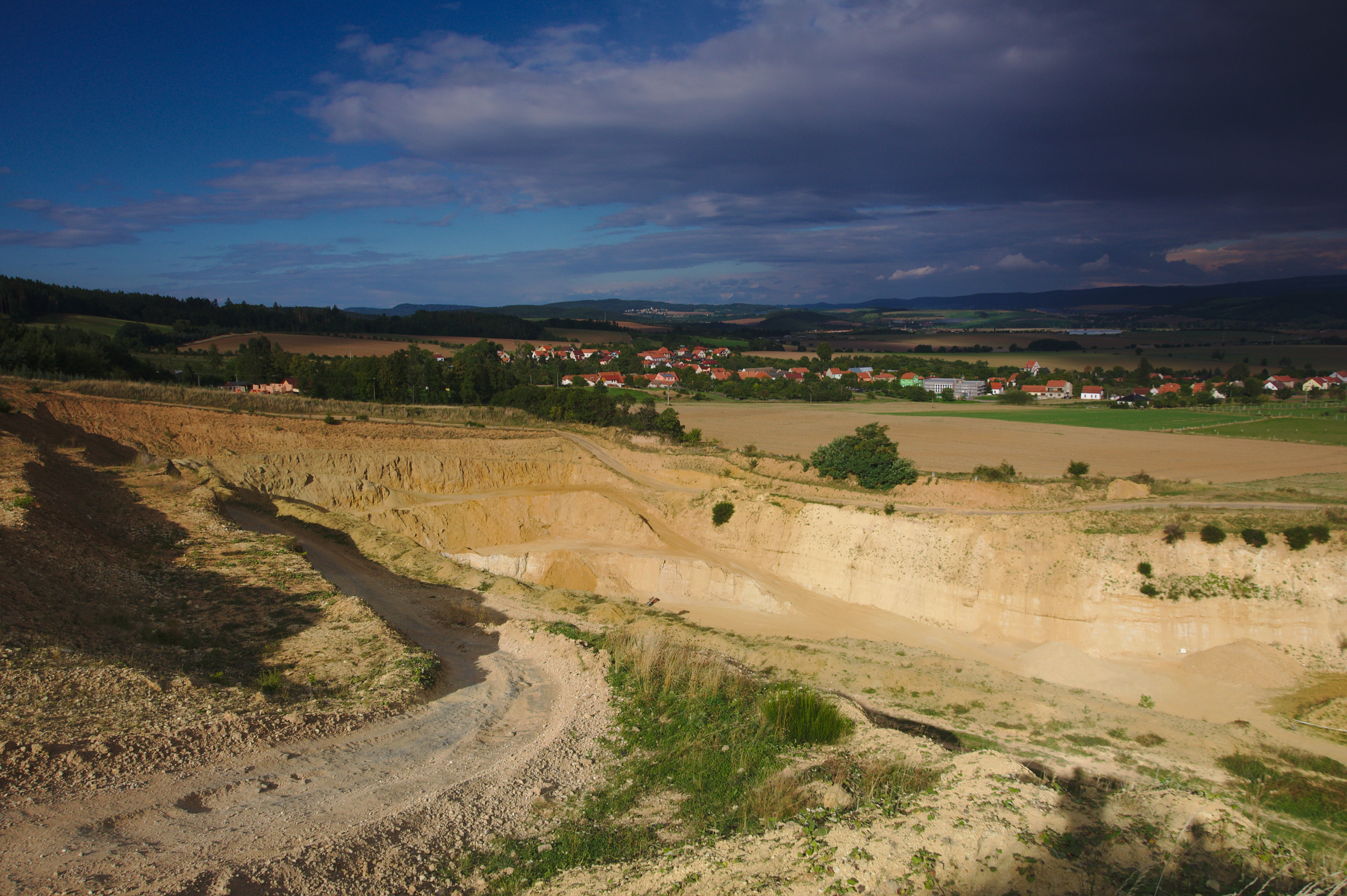
- View from the south

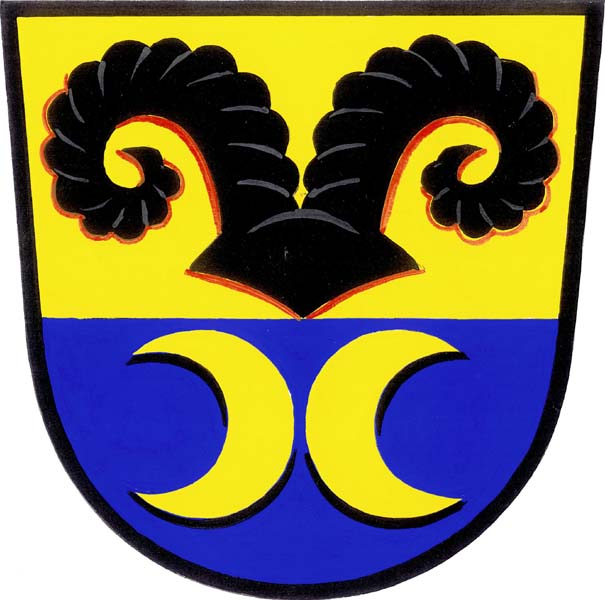
- Flag Coat of arms

- Location in the Czech Republic
- Coordinates: 49°28′53″N 16°33′29″E
- Country: Czech Republic
- Region: South Moravian
- District: Blansko
- First mentioned: 1287

Area
  - Total: 4.44 km^{2} (1.71 sq mi)
- Elevation: 364 m (1,194 ft)

Population (2026-01-01)
  - Total: 558
  - Density: 126/km^{2} (325/sq mi)
- Time zone: UTC+1 (CET)
  - Summer (DST): UTC+2 (CEST)
- Postal code: 679 76
- Website: www.voderady.cz

Voděrady is a municipality and village in Blansko District in the South Moravian Region of the Czech Republic. It has about 600 inhabitants.

Voděrady lies approximately 14 kilometres (9 mi) north-west of Blansko, 31 km (19 mi) north of Brno, and 169 km (105 mi) south-east of Prague.

== Demographics ==
Historical population
Year	Pop.	±%
1869	435	—
1880	461	+6.0%
1890	510	+10.6%
1900	566	+11.0%
1910	603	+6.5%
1921	589	−2.3%
1930	589	+0.0%
1950	568	−3.6%
1961	574	+1.1%
1970	556	−3.1%
1980	497	−10.6%
1991	451	−9.3%
2001	473	+4.9%
2011	508	+7.4%
2021	529	+4.1%
Source: Censuses
