= Voděrady (Ústí nad Orlicí District) =

- Municipality
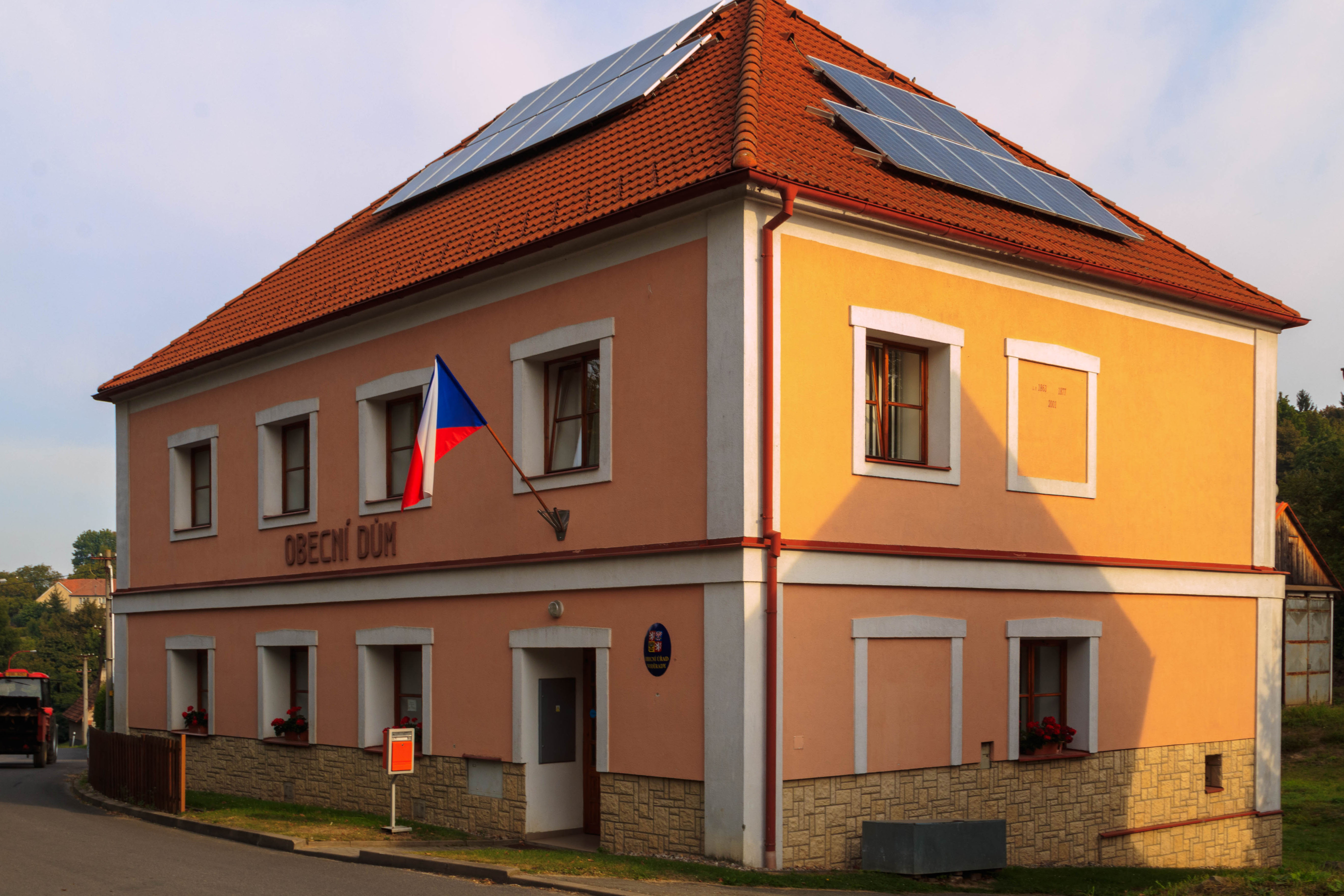
- Municipal office

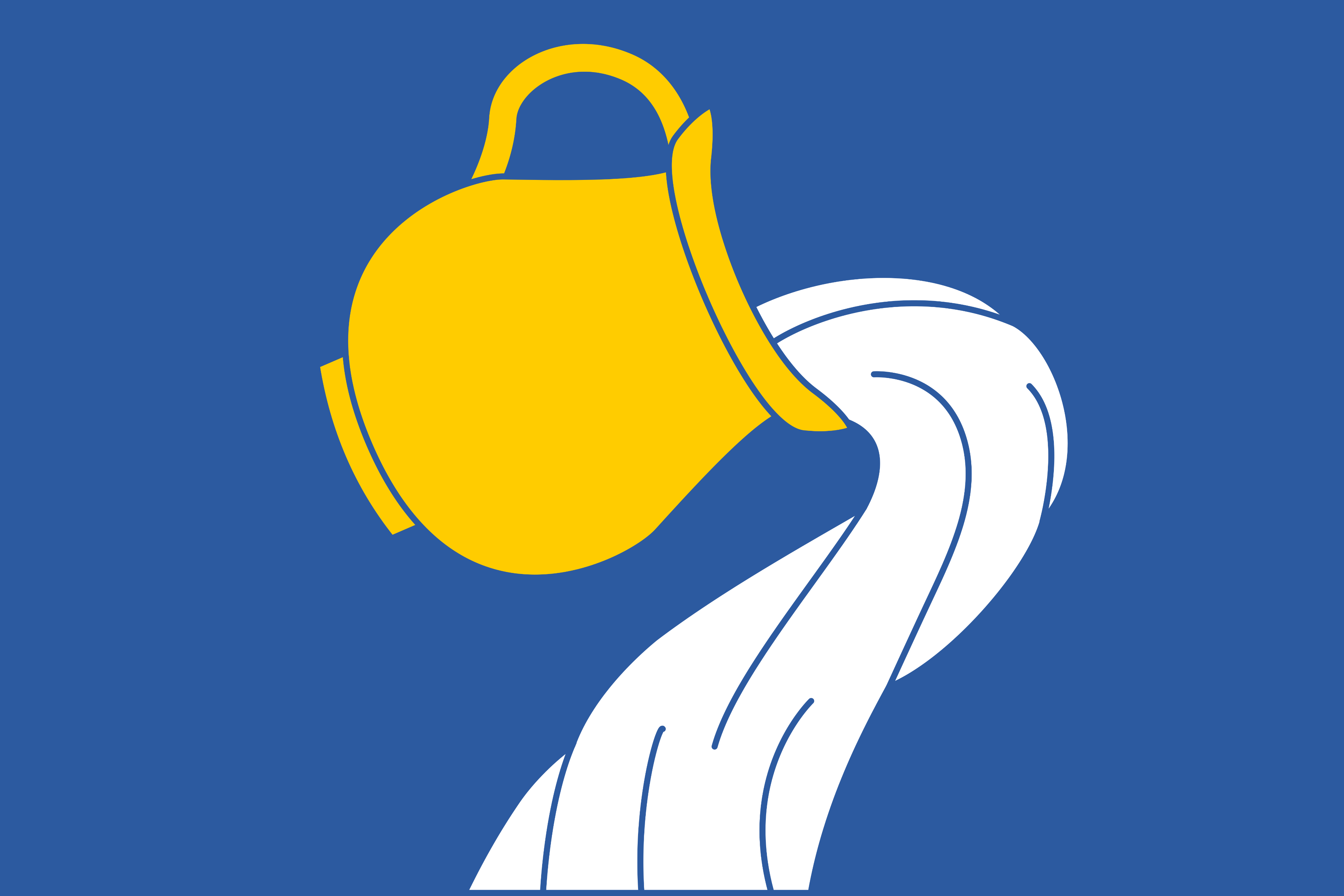
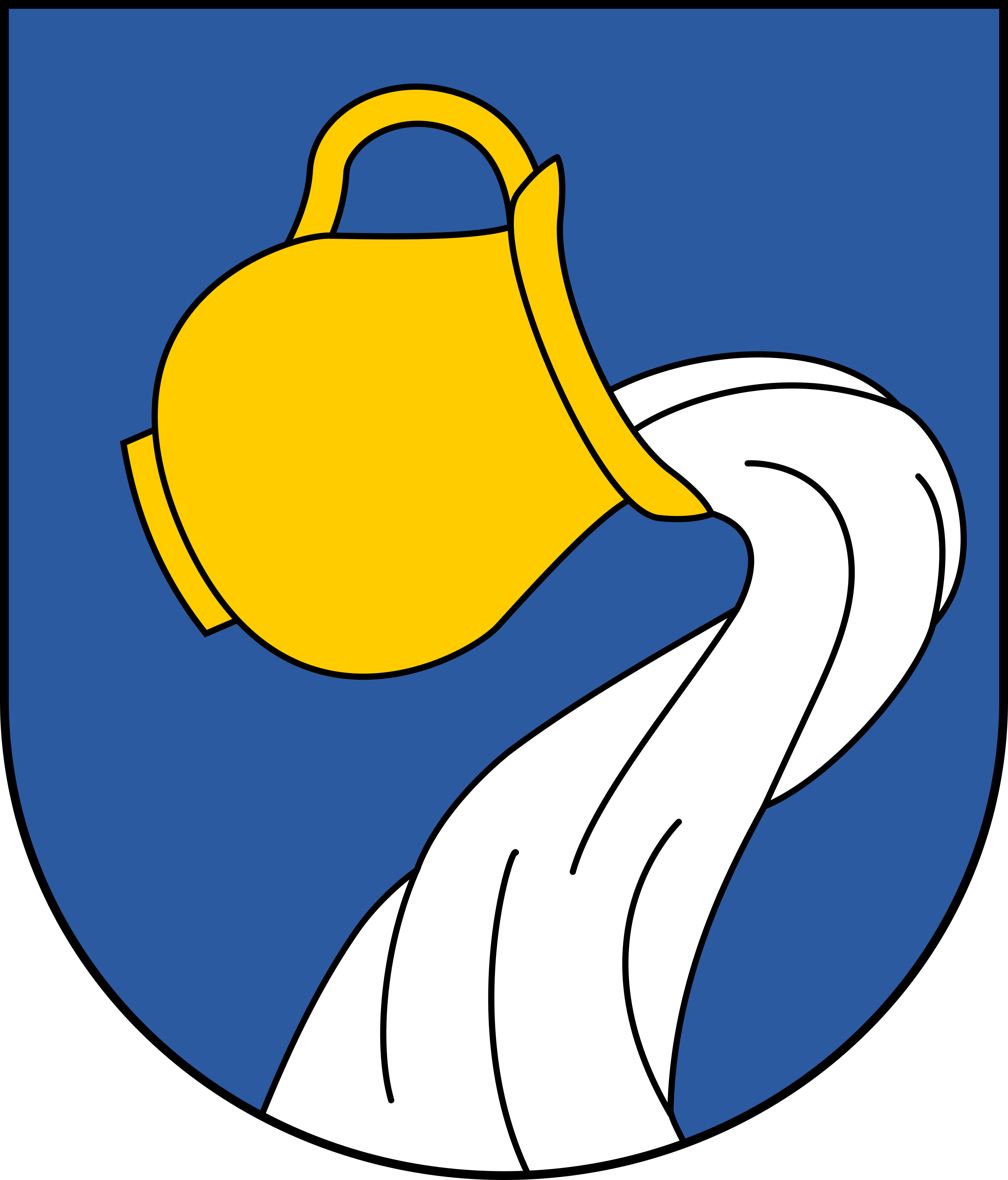
- Flag Coat of arms

- Location in the Czech Republic
- Coordinates: 49°56′59″N 16°17′6″E
- Country: Czech Republic
- Region: Pardubice
- District: Ústí nad Orlicí
- First mentioned: 1292

Area
  - Total: 7.79 km^{2} (3.01 sq mi)
- Elevation: 380 m (1,250 ft)

Population (2026-01-01)
  - Total: 330
  - Density: 42/km^{2} (110/sq mi)
- Time zone: UTC+1 (CET)
  - Summer (DST): UTC+2 (CEST)
- Postal code: 566 01
- Website: voderady-dzbanov.cz

Voděrady (German: Woderau) is a municipality and village in Ústí nad Orlicí District in the Pardubice Region of the Czech Republic. It has about 300 inhabitants.

== Administrative division ==
Voděrady consists of two municipal parts (in brackets population according to the 2021 census):

- Voděrady (206)
- Džbánov (117)

== Etymology ==
The name is probably derived from the Old Czech word voděrad, which denoted a person who likes water (from voda = 'water' and [mít] rád = 'to like'), so the name of the village meant "the village where voděrads live". However, there is also a possibility that the name was derived from the surname Voděrad, meaning "the village of Voděrads (Voděrad family)".

== Geography ==
Voděrady is located about 8 kilometres (5 mi) west of Ústí nad Orlicí and 36 km (22 mi) east of Pardubice. It lies in the Svitavy Uplands. The highest point is at 505 m (1,657 ft) above sea level.

== History ==
The first written mention of Voděrady is from 1292, when the village was bought by the Zbraslav Monastery.

== Demographics ==
Historical population

Year	Pop.	±%
1869	708	—
1880	729	+3.0%
1890	713	−2.2%
1900	659	−7.6%
1910	679	+3.0%

Year	Pop.	±%
1921	637	−6.2%
1930	637	+0.0%
1950	443	−30.5%
1961	466	+5.2%
1970	401	−13.9%

Year	Pop.	±%
1980	372	−7.2%
1991	329	−11.6%
2001	326	−0.9%
2011	324	−0.6%
2021	323	−0.3%

Source: Censuses

== Transport ==
There are no railways or major roads passing through the municipality.

== Sights ==
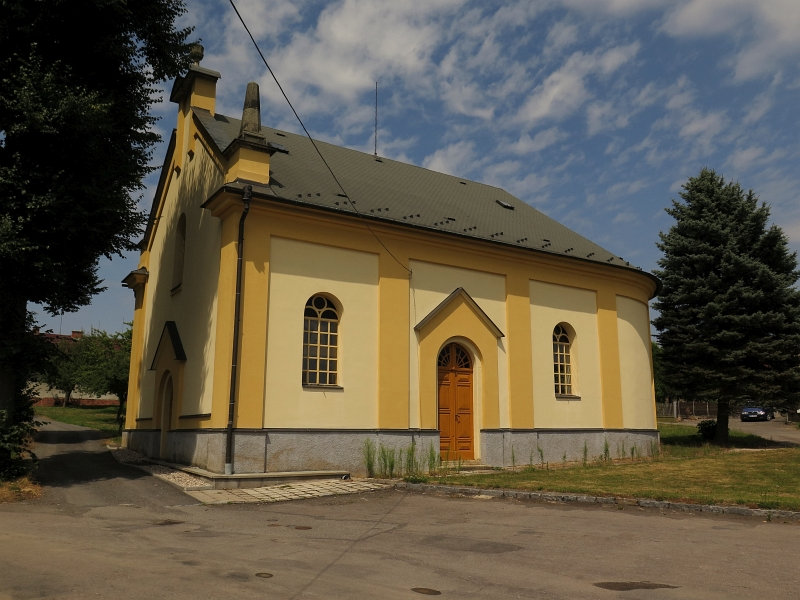
Evangelical church

The main landmark of the municipality is the evangelical church in Džbánov. It was built in 1880–1881, on the site of a church from 1784. It documents the trend of renewal of Protestant churches in the period around the centenary of the issuance of the Patent of Toleration by Emperor Joseph II in 1781.

== Notable people ==
- Anna Chlebounová (1875–1946), politician; lived and died here
