= Záhoří =

Záhoří may refer to places in the Czech Republic:

- Záhoří (Jindřichův Hradec District), a municipality and village in the South Bohemian Region
- Záhoří (Písek District), a municipality and village in the South Bohemian Region
- Záhoří (Semily District), a municipality and village in the Liberec Region
- Záhoří (Tábor District), a municipality and village in the South Bohemian Region
- Záhoří, a village and part of Bošice in the South Bohemian Region
- Záhoří, a village and part of Černošín in the Plzeň Region
- Záhoří, a village and part of Chroboly in the South Bohemian Region
- Záhoří, a village and part of Maršovice (Benešov District) in the Central Bohemian Region
- Záhoří, a village and part of Mileč in the Plzeň Region
- Záhoří, a village and part of Mladé Bříště in the Vysočina Region
- Záhoří, a village and part of Verušičky in the Karlovy Vary Region
- Záhoří, a village and part of Žatec in the Ústí nad Labem Region
- Záhoří, a village and part of Žim in the Ústí nad Labem Region
- Orlické Záhoří, a municipality and village in the Hradec Králové Region

== See also ==
- Záhorie, Bratislava Region, Slovakia
