= Hradčany (disambiguation) =

Hradčany is a district of Prague, Czech Republic.

Hradčany may also refer to places in the Czech Republic:

- Hradčany (Brno-Country District), a municipality and village in the South Moravian Region
- Hradčany (Nymburk District), a municipality and village in the Central Bohemian Region
- Hradčany (Přerov District), a municipality and village in the Olomouc Region
- Hradčany, a village and part of Bílá (Liberec District) in the Liberec Region
- Hradčany, a village and part of Bošice in the South Bohemian Region
- Hradčany, a village and part of Chlumčany (Plzeň-South District) in the Plzeň Region
- Hradčany, a village and part of Hradčany-Kobeřice in the Olomouc Region
- Hradčany, a village and part of Ralsko in the Liberec Region
  - Hradčany Airport, a former military airport near this village
