= Hradčany (Brno-Country District) =

- Municipality
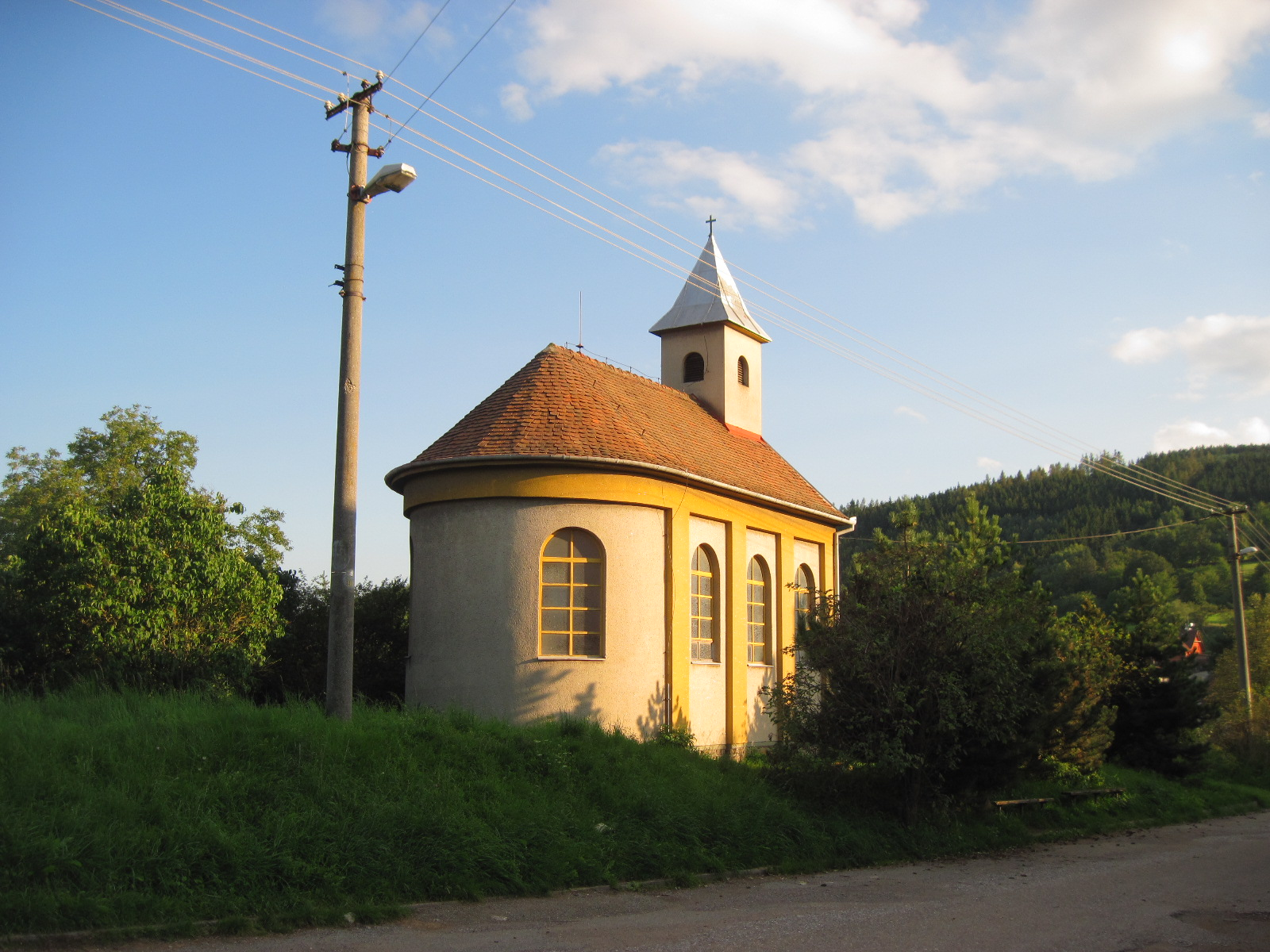
- Chapel of Saint Anne

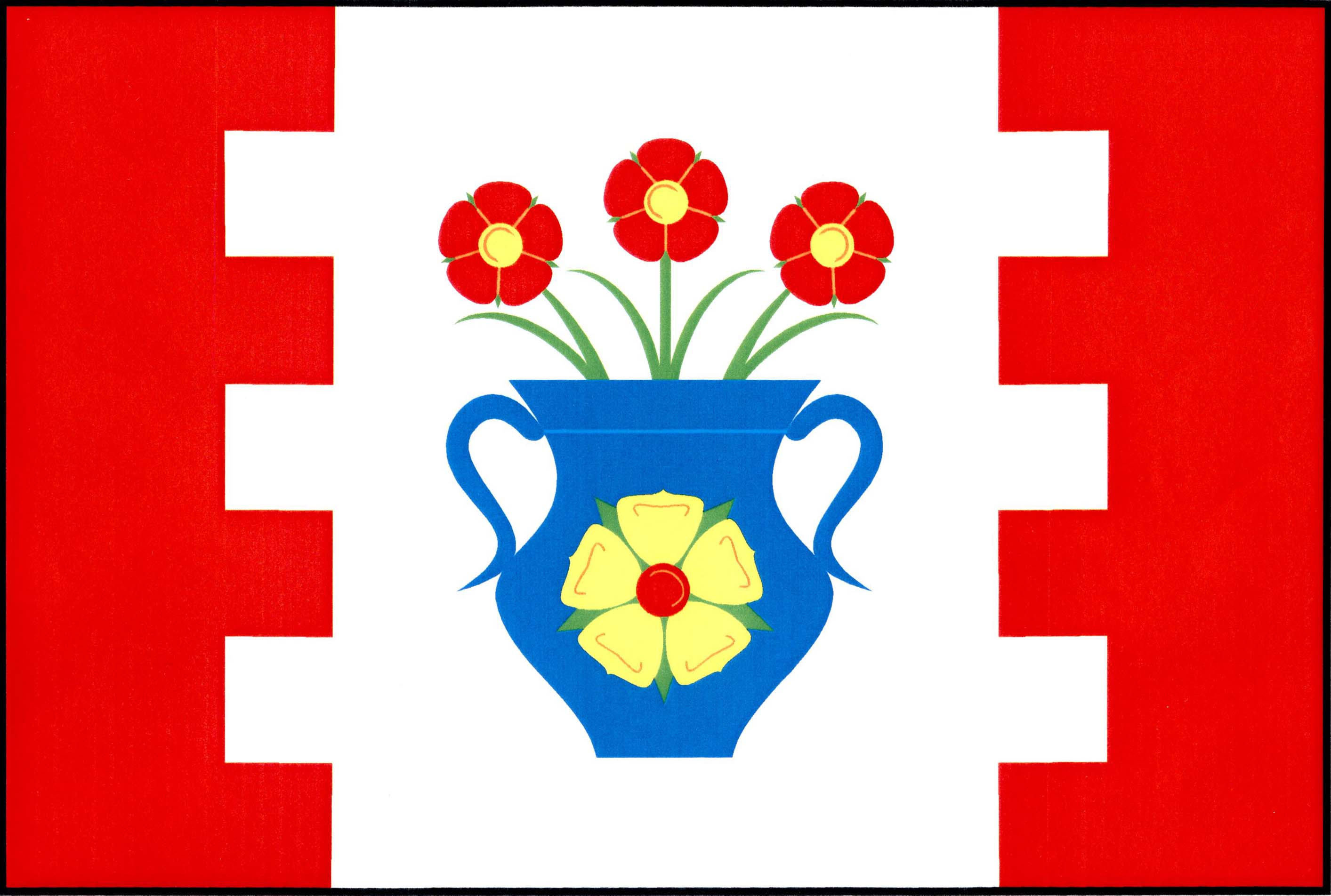
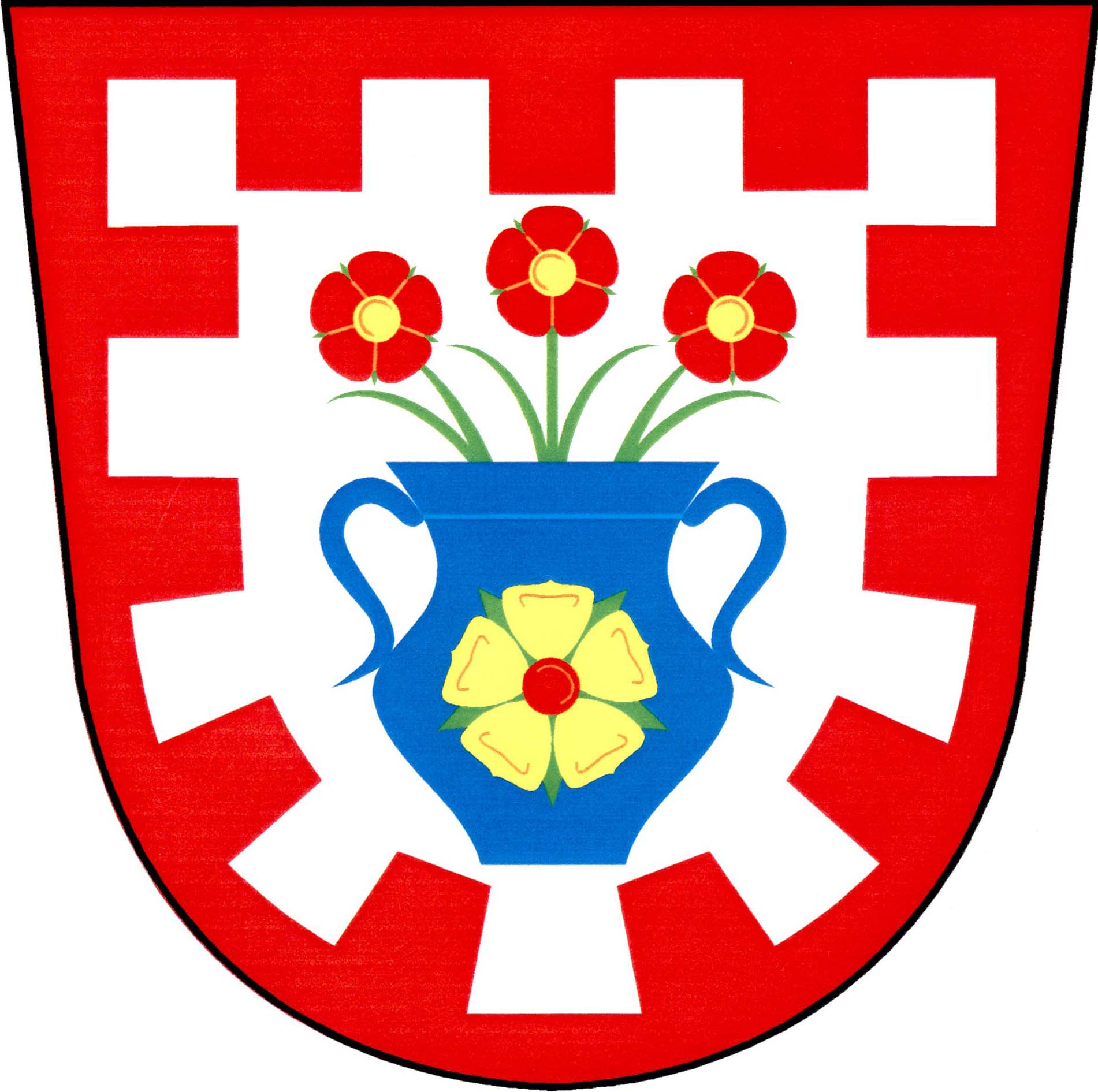
- Flag Coat of arms

- Location in the Czech Republic
- Coordinates: 49°19′40″N 16°26′32″E
- Country: Czech Republic
- Region: South Moravian
- District: Brno-Country
- First mentioned: 1397

Area
  - Total: 3.06 km^{2} (1.18 sq mi)
- Elevation: 247 m (810 ft)

Population (2026-01-01)
  - Total: 677
  - Density: 221/km^{2} (573/sq mi)
- Time zone: UTC+1 (CET)
  - Summer (DST): UTC+2 (CEST)
- Postal code: 666 03
- Website: www.hradcanyutisnova.cz

Hradčany is a municipality and village in Brno-Country District in the South Moravian Region of the Czech Republic. It has about 700 inhabitants.

Hradčany lies approximately 19 kilometres (12 mi) north-west of Brno and 169 km (105 mi) south-east of Prague.

== Demographics ==
Historical population
| Year | Pop. | ±% |
|---|---|---|
| 1869 | 244 | — |
| 1880 | 243 | −0.4% |
| 1890 | 284 | +16.9% |
| 1900 | 326 | +14.8% |
| 1910 | 308 | −5.5% |
| 1921 | 299 | −2.9% |
| 1930 | 393 | +31.4% |
| 1950 | 393 | +0.0% |
| 1961 | 379 | −3.6% |
| 1970 | 404 | +6.6% |
| 1980 | 447 | +10.6% |
| 1991 | 438 | −2.0% |
| 2001 | 478 | +9.1% |
| 2011 | 592 | +23.8% |
| 2021 | 669 | +13.0% |
Source: Censuses
