= Záhoří (Tábor District) =

- Municipality
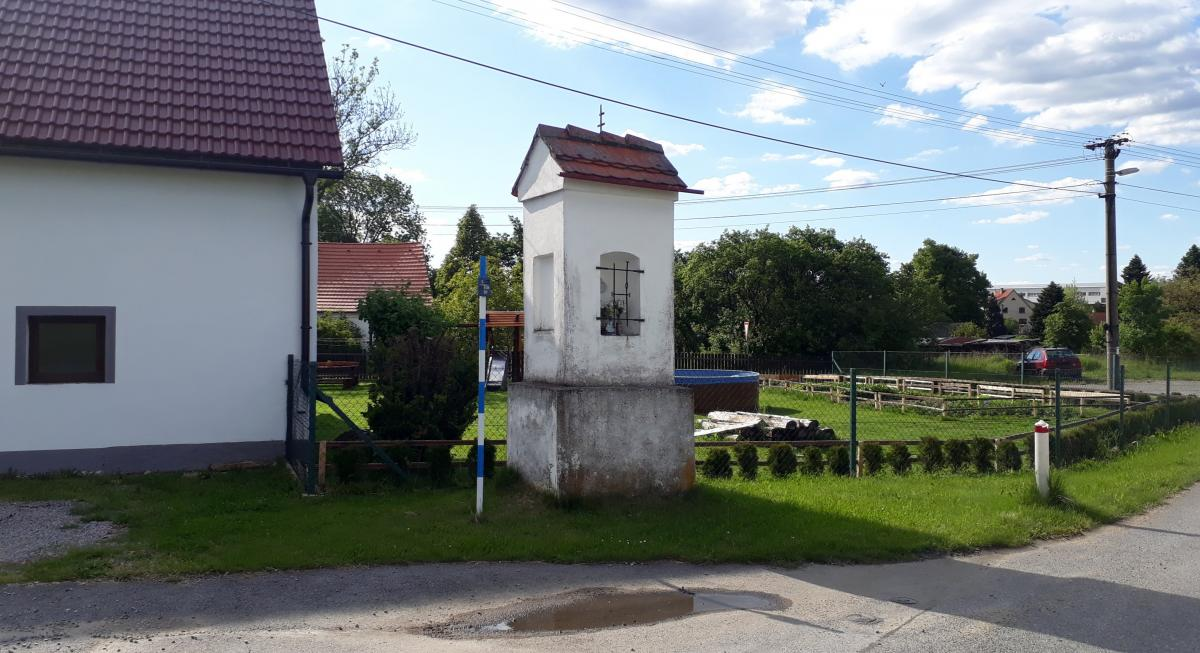
- Chapel in Záhoří

- Location in the Czech Republic
- Coordinates: 49°14′23″N 14°30′49″E
- Country: Czech Republic
- Region: South Bohemian
- District: Tábor
- First mentioned: 1379

Area
  - Total: 4.02 km^{2} (1.55 sq mi)
- Elevation: 438 m (1,437 ft)

Population (2026-01-01)
  - Total: 72
  - Density: 18/km^{2} (46/sq mi)
- Time zone: UTC+1 (CET)
  - Summer (DST): UTC+2 (CEST)
- Postal code: 391 65
- Website: www.obeczahori.eu

Záhoří is a municipality and village in Tábor District in the South Bohemian Region of the Czech Republic. It has about 70 inhabitants.

Záhoří lies approximately 22 kilometres (14 mi) south-west of Tábor, 30 km (19 mi) north of České Budějovice, and 95 km (59 mi) south of Prague.

== Demographics ==
Historical population
| Year | Pop. | ±% |
|---|---|---|
| 1869 | 174 | — |
| 1880 | 201 | +15.5% |
| 1890 | 194 | −3.5% |
| 1900 | 190 | −2.1% |
| 1910 | 195 | +2.6% |
| 1921 | 202 | +3.6% |
| 1930 | 184 | −8.9% |
| 1950 | 139 | −24.5% |
| 1961 | 110 | −20.9% |
| 1970 | 91 | −17.3% |
| 1980 | 77 | −15.4% |
| 1991 | 77 | +0.0% |
| 2001 | 63 | −18.2% |
| 2011 | 52 | −17.5% |
| 2021 | 53 | +1.9% |
Source: Censuses
