= Mileč =

- Municipality
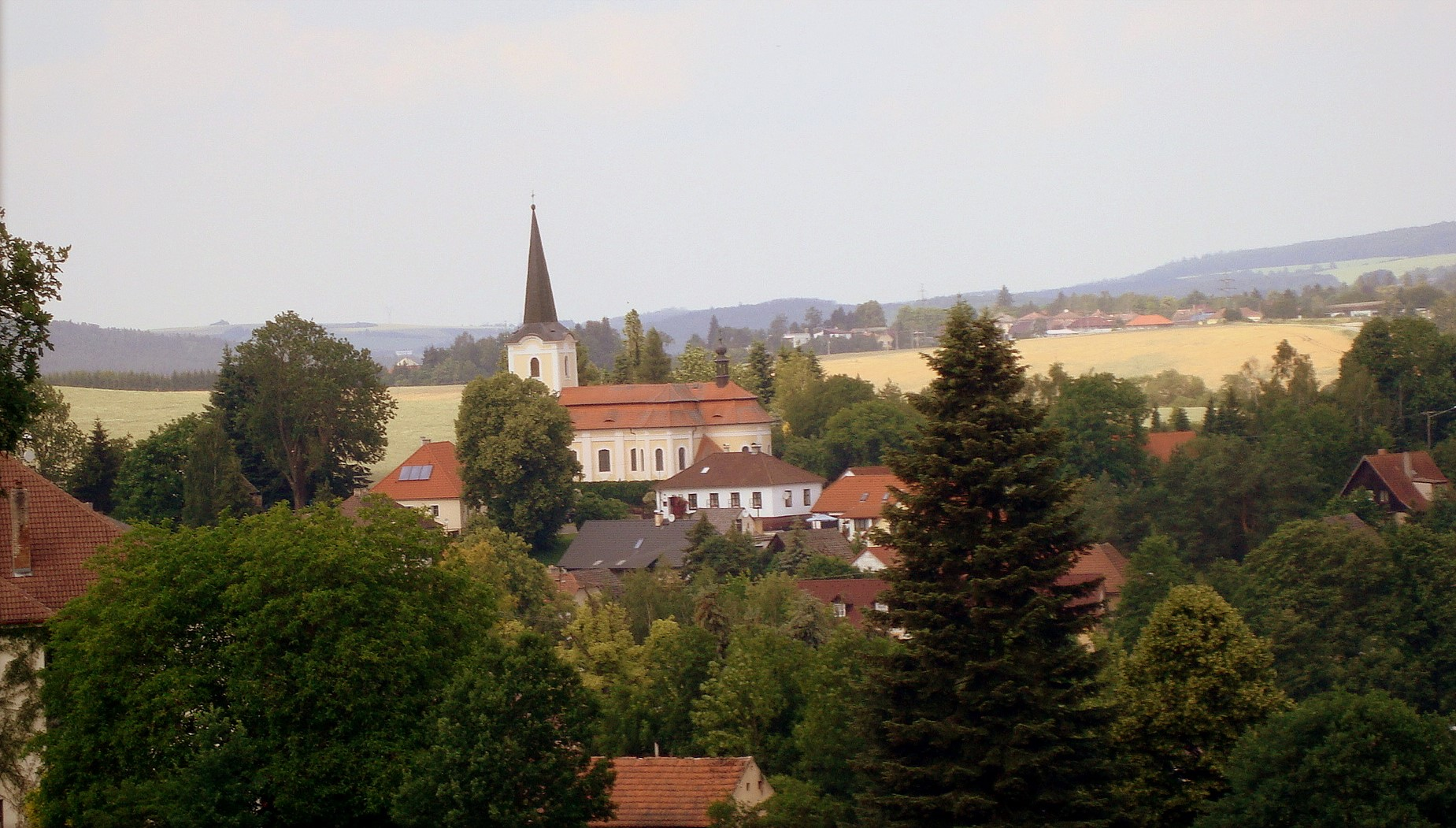
- Church of Saints Peter and Paul

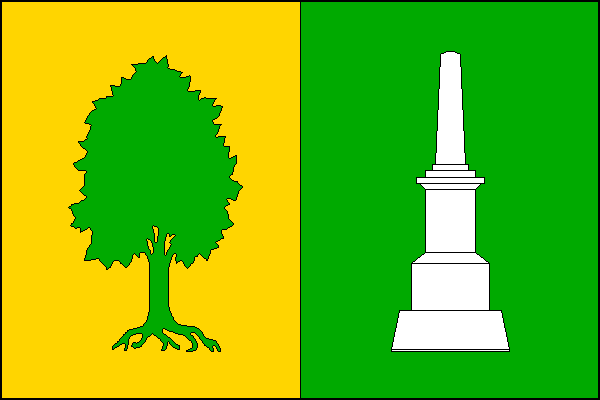
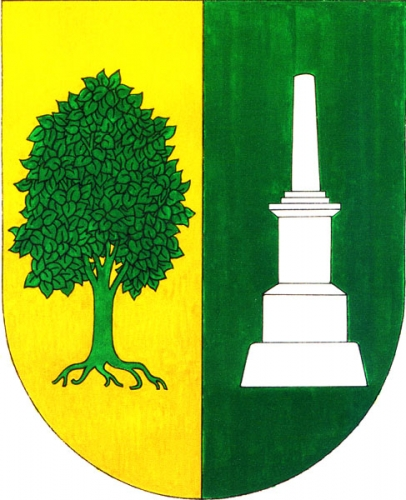
- Flag Coat of arms

- Location in the Czech Republic
- Coordinates: 49°28′11″N 13°36′16″E
- Country: Czech Republic
- Region: Plzeň
- District: Plzeň-South
- First mentioned: 1352

Area
  - Total: 16.37 km^{2} (6.32 sq mi)
- Elevation: 442 m (1,450 ft)

Population (2026-01-01)
  - Total: 375
  - Density: 22.9/km^{2} (59.3/sq mi)
- Time zone: UTC+1 (CET)
  - Summer (DST): UTC+2 (CEST)
- Postal code: 335 01
- Website: www.obecmilec.cz

Mileč is a municipality and village in Plzeň-South District in the Plzeň Region of the Czech Republic. It has about 400 inhabitants.

Mileč lies approximately 36 kilometres (22 mi) south-east of Plzeň and 91 km (57 mi) south-west of Prague.

== Administrative division ==
Mileč consists of five municipal parts (in brackets population according to the 2021 census):

- Mileč (105)
- Bezděkovec (53)
- Maňovice (61)
- Záhoří (57)
- Želvice (71)

== Demographics ==
Historical population
Year	Pop.	±%
1869	1,226	—
1880	1,294	+5.5%
1890	1,174	−9.3%
1900	1,164	−0.9%
1910	1,184	+1.7%
1921	1,213	+2.4%
1930	1,108	−8.7%
1950	856	−22.7%
1961	760	−11.2%
1970	628	−17.4%
1980	485	−22.8%
1991	401	−17.3%
2001	364	−9.2%
2011	360	−1.1%
2021	347	−3.6%
Source: Censuses
