= Záhoří (Jindřichův Hradec District) =

- Municipality
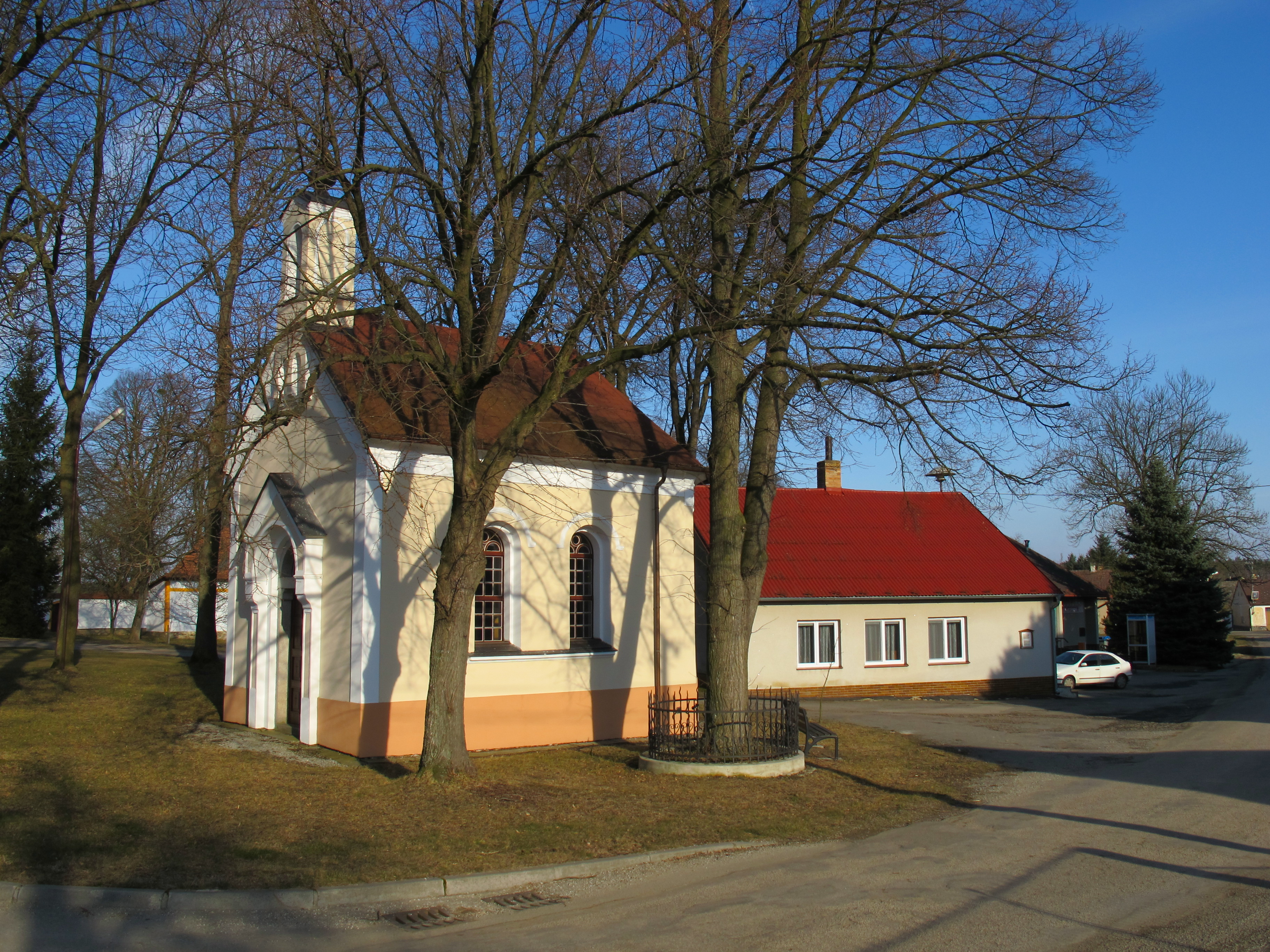
- Chapel of Saint Bartholomew

- Location in the Czech Republic
- Coordinates: 49°12′47″N 14°47′54″E
- Country: Czech Republic
- Region: South Bohemian
- District: Jindřichův Hradec
- First mentioned: 1350

Area
  - Total: 3.61 km^{2} (1.39 sq mi)
- Elevation: 457 m (1,499 ft)

Population (2026-01-01)
  - Total: 110
  - Density: 30/km^{2} (79/sq mi)
- Time zone: UTC+1 (CET)
  - Summer (DST): UTC+2 (CEST)
- Postal code: 378 21
- Website: zahori-jh.estranky.cz

Záhoří is a municipality and village in Jindřichův Hradec District in the South Bohemian Region of the Czech Republic. It has about 100 inhabitants.

Záhoří lies approximately 16 kilometres (10 mi) north-west of Jindřichův Hradec, 36 km (22 mi) north-east of České Budějovice, and 102 km (63 mi) south of Prague.

== Demographics ==
Historical population
Year	Pop.	±%
1869	150	—
1880	162	+8.0%
1890	171	+5.6%
1900	159	−7.0%
1910	173	+8.8%
1921	183	+5.8%
1930	180	−1.6%
1950	129	−28.3%
1961	131	+1.6%
1970	114	−13.0%
1980	127	+11.4%
1991	139	+9.4%
2001	129	−7.2%
2011	124	−3.9%
2021	113	−8.9%
Source: Censuses
