= Hradčany (Přerov District) =

- Municipality
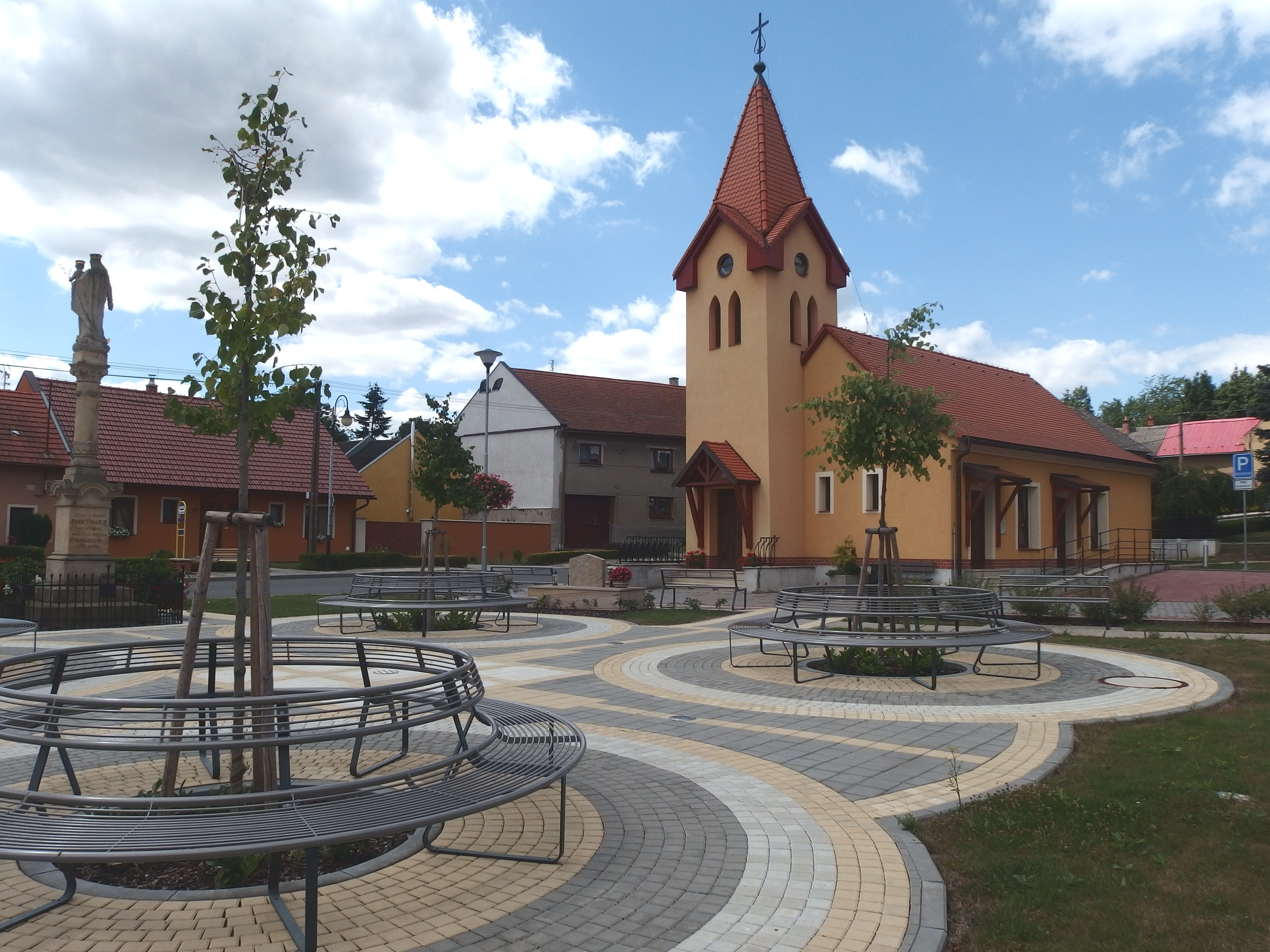
- Chapel of Saint Anthony of Padua

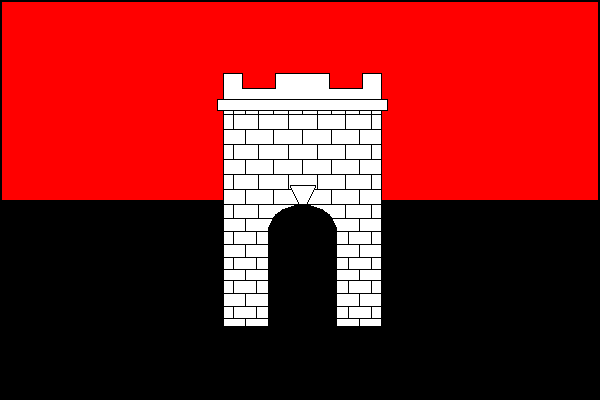
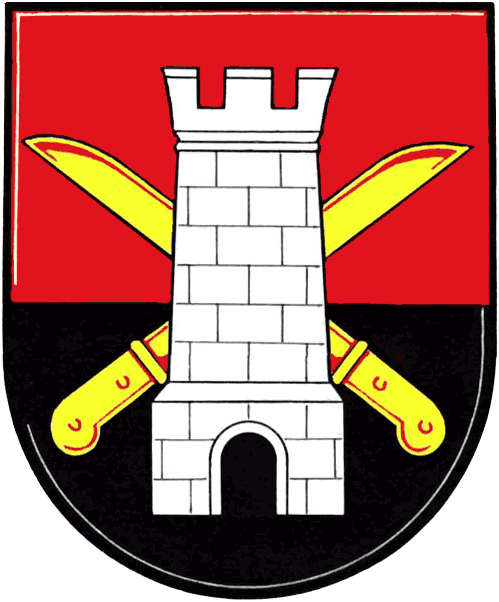
- Flag Coat of arms

- Location in the Czech Republic
- Coordinates: 49°27′9″N 17°34′18″E
- Country: Czech Republic
- Region: Olomouc
- District: Přerov
- First mentioned: 1160

Area
  - Total: 5.32 km^{2} (2.05 sq mi)
- Elevation: 245 m (804 ft)

Population (2026-01-01)
  - Total: 339
  - Density: 63.7/km^{2} (165/sq mi)
- Time zone: UTC+1 (CET)
  - Summer (DST): UTC+2 (CEST)
- Postal code: 751 11
- Website: www.obechradcany.cz

Hradčany is a municipality and village in Přerov District in the Olomouc Region of the Czech Republic. It has about 300 inhabitants.

Hradčany lies approximately 9 kilometres (6 mi) east of Přerov, 29 km (18 mi) south-east of Olomouc, and 238 km (148 mi) east of Prague.

== Demographics ==
Historical population
Year	Pop.	±%
1869	284	—
1880	316	+11.3%
1890	329	+4.1%
1900	335	+1.8%
1910	363	+8.4%
1921	374	+3.0%
1930	348	−7.0%
1950	327	−6.0%
1961	325	−0.6%
1970	271	−16.6%
1980	281	+3.7%
1991	267	−5.0%
2001	255	−4.5%
2011	271	+6.3%
2021	296	+9.2%
Source: Censuses
