= Bošice =

- Municipality
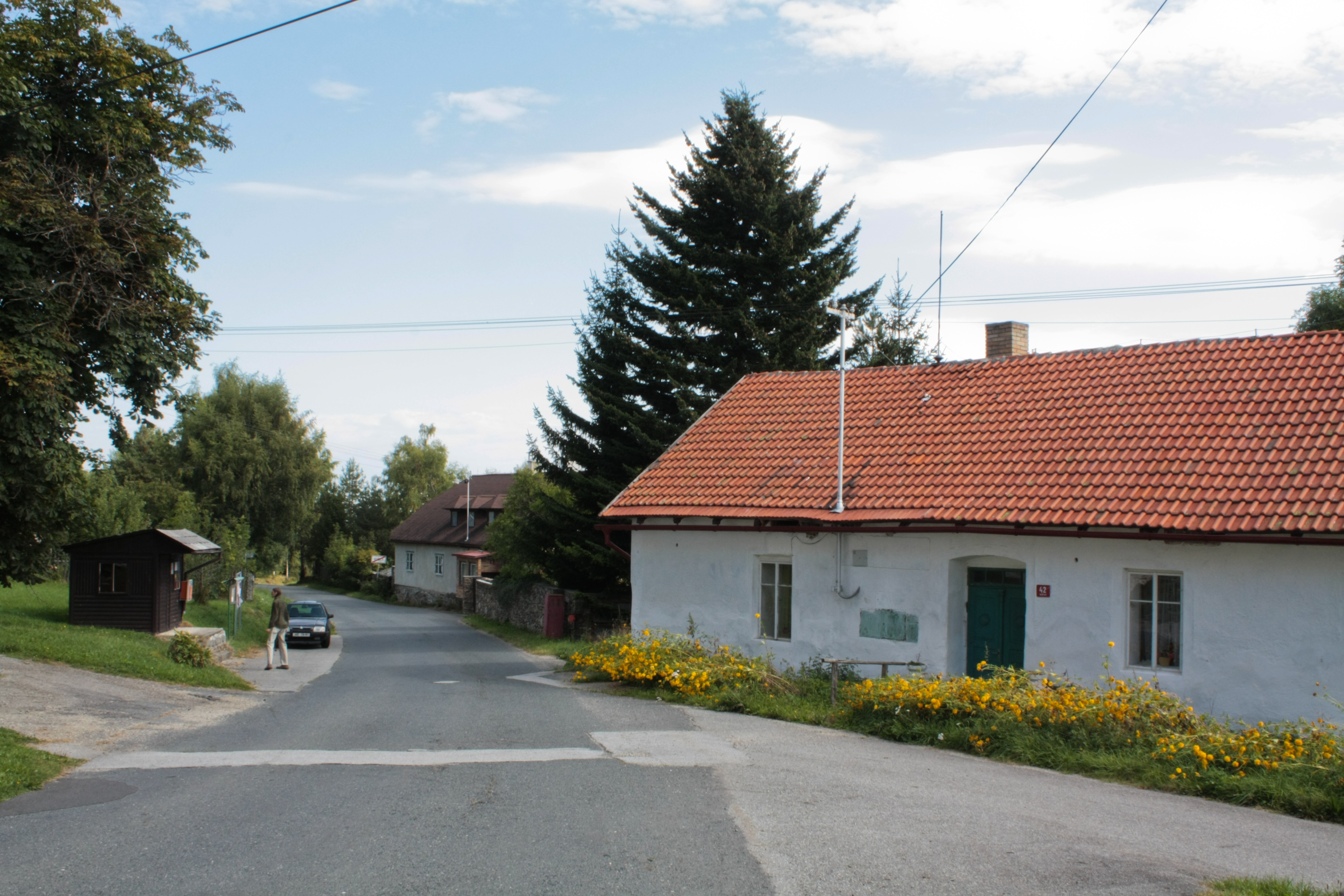
- Main road

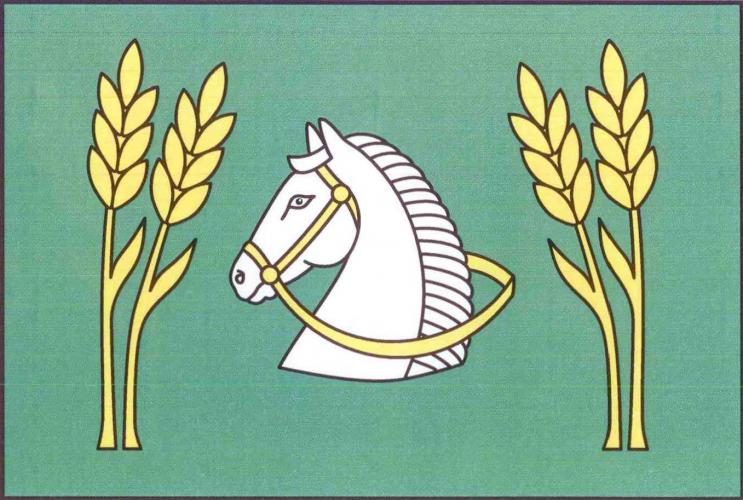
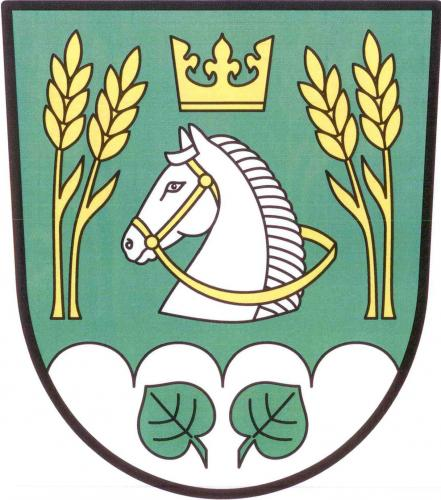
- Flag Coat of arms

- Location in the Czech Republic
- Coordinates: 49°5′22″N 13°50′25″E
- Country: Czech Republic
- Region: South Bohemian
- District: Prachatice
- First mentioned: 1315

Area
  - Total: 8.34 km^{2} (3.22 sq mi)
- Elevation: 588 m (1,929 ft)

Population (2026-01-01)
  - Total: 381
  - Density: 45.7/km^{2} (118/sq mi)
- Time zone: UTC+1 (CET)
  - Summer (DST): UTC+2 (CEST)
- Postal code: 384 81
- Website: www.obecbosice.cz

Bošice is a municipality and village in Prachatice District in the South Bohemian Region of the Czech Republic. It has about 400 inhabitants.

== Administrative division ==
Bošice consists of four municipal parts (in brackets population according to the 2021 census):

- Bošice (108)
- Budilov (127)
- Hradčany (63)
- Záhoří (36)

== Etymology ==
The name was derived from the personal name Bogeš, Bohuš or Boch, meaning "the village of Bogeš's/Bohuš's/Boch's people".

== Geography ==
Bošice is located about 14 kilometres (9 mi) northwest of Prachatice and 47 km (29 mi) west of České Budějovice. It lies in the Bohemian Forest Foothills. The highest point is the hill Mařský vrch at 907 m (2,976 ft) above sea level. The stream Hradčanský potok flows through the municipality.

== History ==
The first written mention of Bošice is in a deed of Queen Elizabeth of Bohemia from 1315. Among the notable owners of the village were the noble families of Pernštejn, Rosenberg and Thun und Hohenstein.

== Demographics ==
Historical population

Year	Pop.	±%
1869	801	—
1880	837	+4.5%
1890	888	+6.1%
1900	876	−1.4%
1910	852	−2.7%

Year	Pop.	±%
1921	823	−3.4%
1930	781	−5.1%
1950	528	−32.4%
1961	539	+2.1%
1970	448	−16.9%

Year	Pop.	±%
1980	352	−21.4%
1991	284	−19.3%
2001	294	+3.5%
2011	276	−6.1%
2021	334	+21.0%

Source: Censuses

== Transport ==
There are no railways or major roads passing through the municipality.

== Sights ==
Among the landmarks of the municipality are the Chapel of the Nativity of the Virgin Mary in Bošice and the Chapel of Saint Wenceslaus in Budilov.
