= Morašice =

Morašice may refer to places in the Czech Republic:

- Morašice (Chrudim District), a municipality and village in the Pardubice Region
- Morašice (Pardubice District), a municipality and village in the Pardubice Region
- Morašice (Svitavy District), a municipality and village in the Pardubice Region
- Morašice (Znojmo District), a municipality and village in the South Moravian Region
