= Nová Sídla =

- Municipality
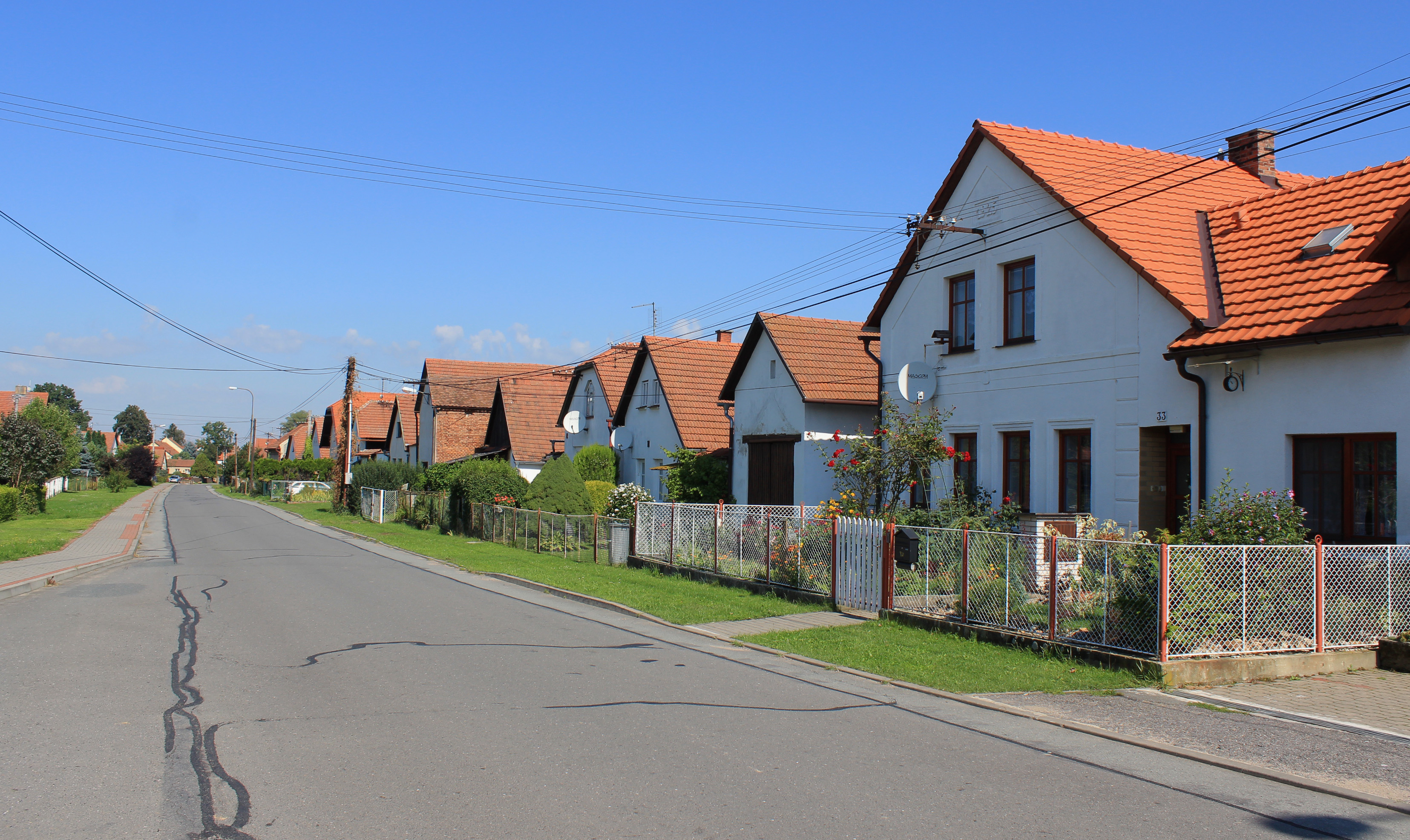
- Main street

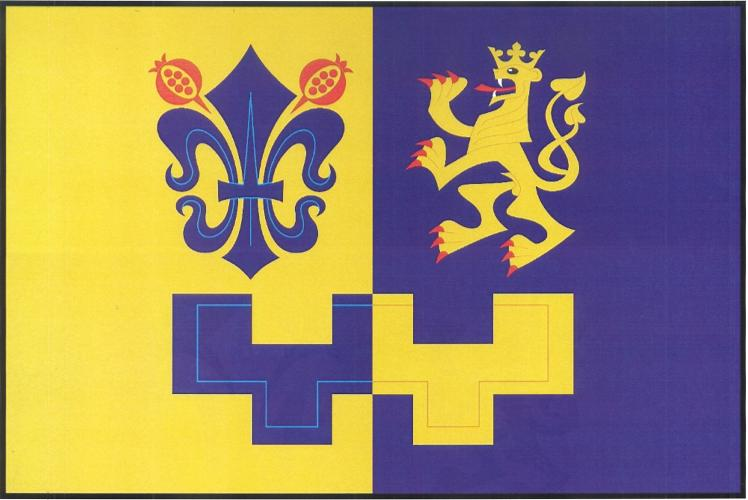
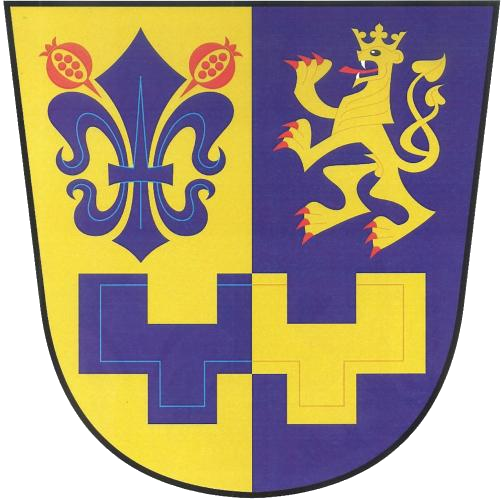
- Flag Coat of arms

- Location in the Czech Republic
- Coordinates: 49°53′2″N 16°14′14″E
- Country: Czech Republic
- Region: Pardubice
- District: Svitavy
- Established: 1786

Area
  - Total: 2.95 km^{2} (1.14 sq mi)
- Elevation: 313 m (1,027 ft)

Population (2026-01-01)
  - Total: 273
  - Density: 92.5/km^{2} (240/sq mi)
- Time zone: UTC+1 (CET)
  - Summer (DST): UTC+2 (CEST)
- Postal code: 570 01
- Website: www.novasidla.cz

Nová Sídla is a municipality and village in Svitavy District in the Pardubice Region of the Czech Republic. It has about 300 inhabitants.

== Administrative division ==
Nová Sídla consists of two municipal parts (in brackets population according to the 2021 census):

- Nová Sídla (191)
- Sedlíšťka (47)

== Etymology ==
The name Nová Sídla literally translates from Czech as 'new settlements'.

== Geography ==
Nová Sídla is located about 21 kilometres (13 mi) northwest of Svitavy and 36 km (22 mi) southeast of Pardubice. It lies in the Svitavy Uplands. The highest point is a flat nameless hill at 339 m (1,112 ft) above sea level. The Desná Stream flows along the northern municipal border and then joins the Loučná River just outside the territory of Nová Sídla.

== History ==
Archaeological finds suggest the area of the current municipality was first settled in the Middle Ages. Ancient and prehistoric artifacts were also reported to be found in the area. Nová Sídla was founded in 1786 by Count Jiří Kristián of Valdštejn. After the abolition of serfdom in 1848, Nová Sídla became a municipal part of Morašice. In 1892, Nová Sídla and Sedlíšťka separated from Morašice and created a new municipality called Sedlíšťka-Nová Sídla. In 1982, the municipality was renamed Nová Sídla.

== Demographics ==
Historical population

Year	Pop.	±%
1869	467	—
1880	464	−0.6%
1890	455	−1.9%
1900	457	+0.4%
1910	453	−0.9%

Year	Pop.	±%
1921	412	−9.1%
1930	398	−3.4%
1950	296	−25.6%
1961	350	+18.2%
1970	335	−4.3%

Year	Pop.	±%
1980	295	−11.9%
1991	249	−15.6%
2001	237	−4.8%
2011	230	−3.0%
2021	238	+3.5%

Source: Censuses

== Transport ==
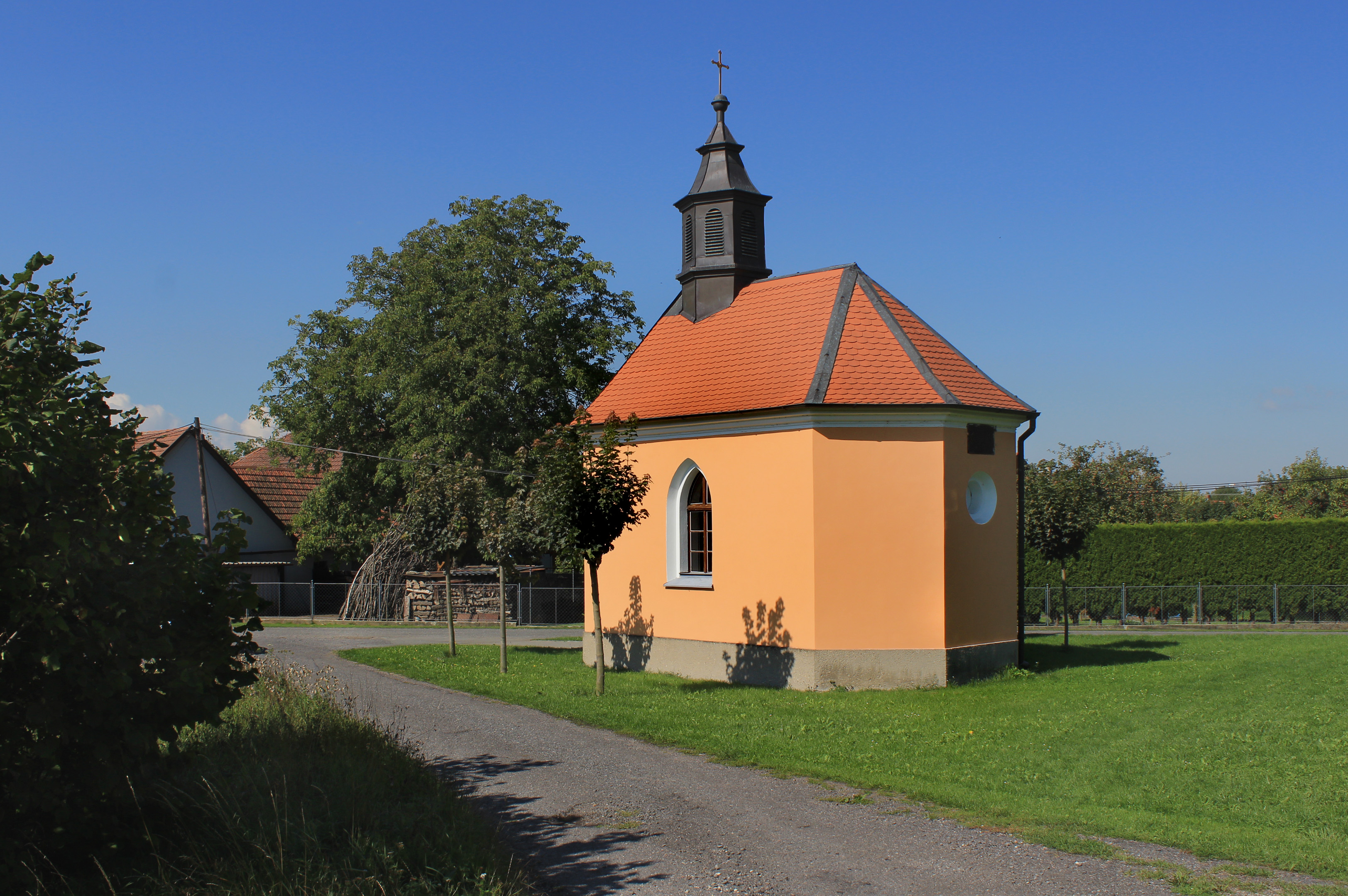
Chapel in Nová Sídla

There are no railways or major roads passing through the municipality.

== Culture ==
In 1905, the Hospodářská beseda society was established, which supported the cultural life of the municipality and operated a travelling library. This was the predecessor of the municipal library, which still operates today.

== Sights ==
The only protected cultural monument in the municipality is a late Baroque granary, located in Sedlíšťka. It was built in the area of the former fortress and is surrounded by a well-preserved moat.
