= Morašice (Pardubice District) =

- Municipality
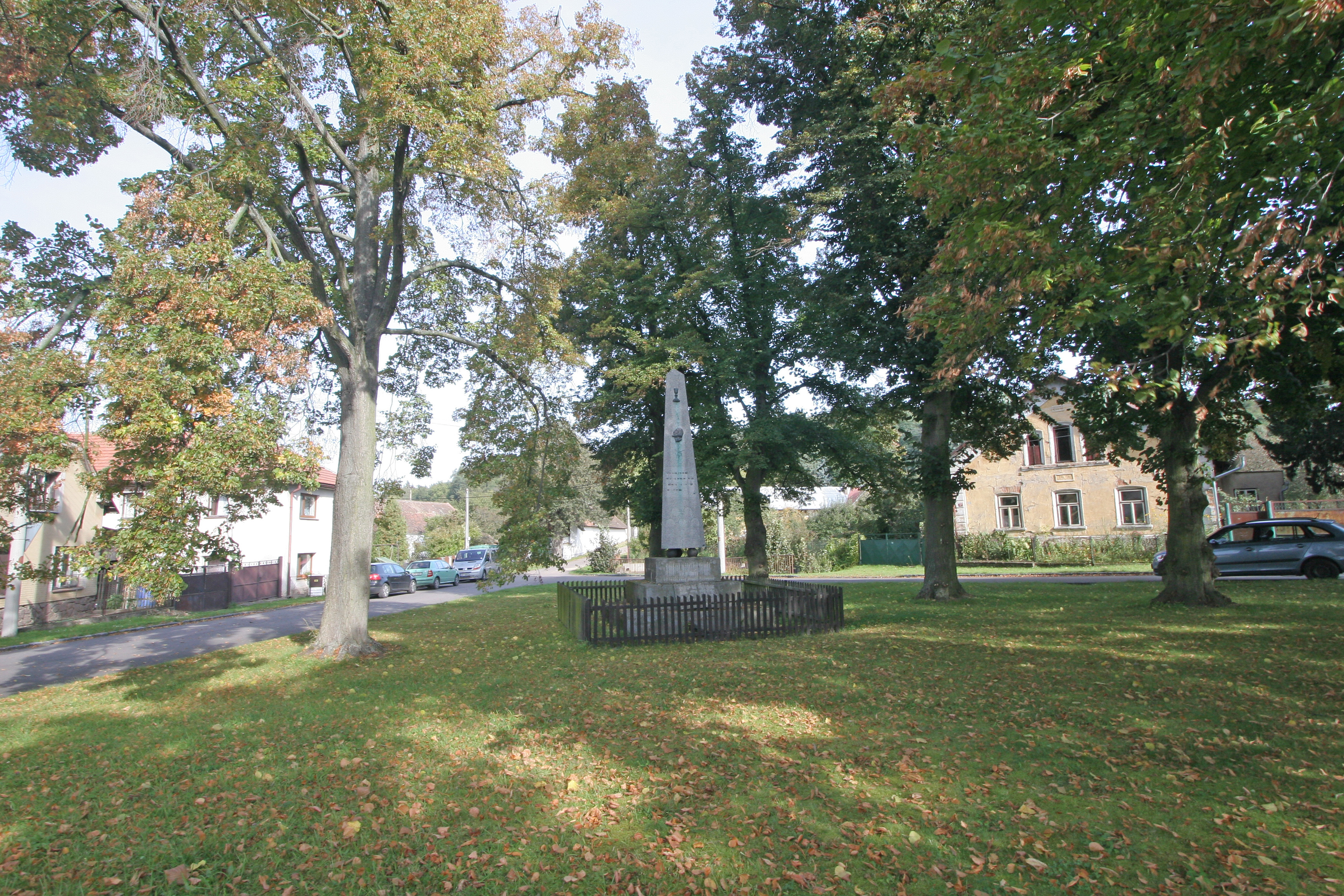
- Centre of Morašice

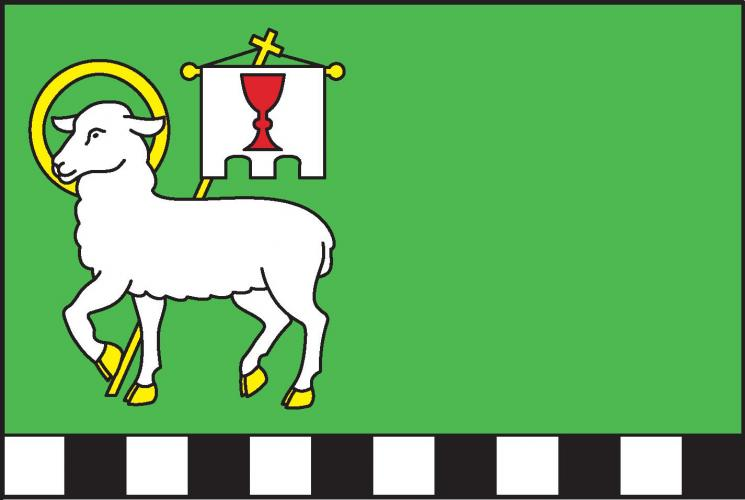
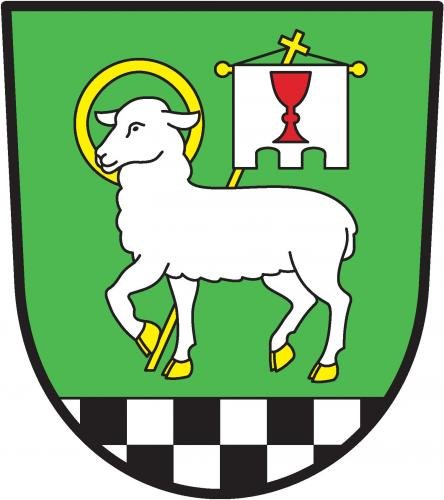
- Flag Coat of arms

- Location in the Czech Republic
- Coordinates: 50°0′7″N 15°29′10″E
- Country: Czech Republic
- Region: Pardubice
- District: Pardubice
- First mentioned: 1487

Area
  - Total: 4.47 km^{2} (1.73 sq mi)
- Elevation: 258 m (846 ft)

Population (2026-01-01)
  - Total: 96
  - Density: 21/km^{2} (56/sq mi)
- Time zone: UTC+1 (CET)
  - Summer (DST): UTC+2 (CEST)
- Postal code: 535 01
- Website: www.obec-morasice.cz

Morašice is a municipality and village in Pardubice District in the Pardubice Region of the Czech Republic. It has about 100 inhabitants.

== Demographics ==
Historical population
Year	Pop.	±%
1869	214	—
1880	225	+5.1%
1890	266	+18.2%
1900	251	−5.6%
1910	265	+5.6%
1921	223	−15.8%
1930	227	+1.8%
1950	191	−15.9%
1961	200	+4.7%
1970	164	−18.0%
1980	132	−19.5%
1991	120	−9.1%
2001	108	−10.0%
2011	97	−10.2%
2021	83	−14.4%
Source: Censuses
