= Morašice (Znojmo District) =

- Municipality
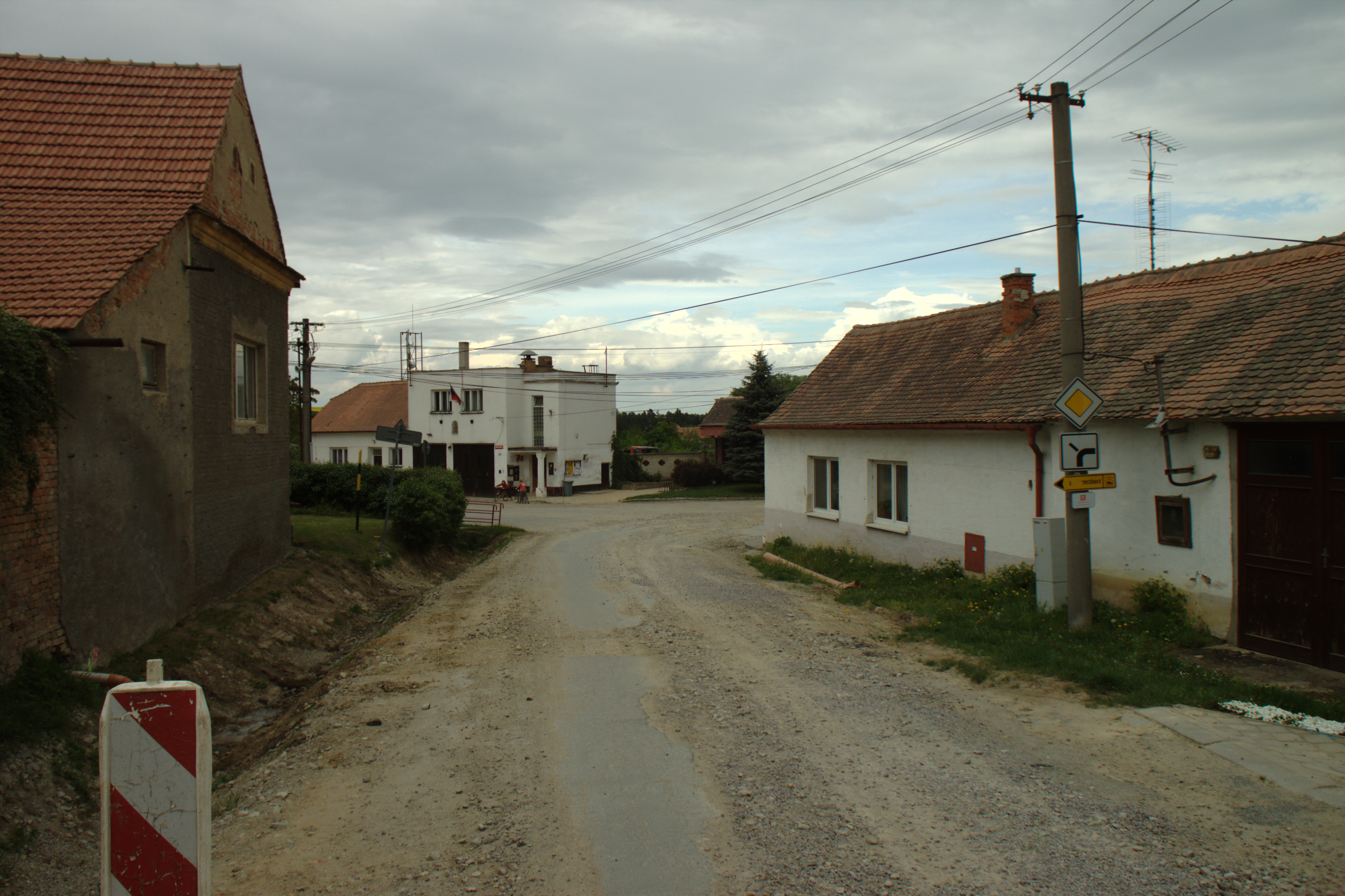
- View towards the municipal office

- Flag Coat of arms

- Location in the Czech Republic
- Coordinates: 48°57′27″N 16°12′32″E
- Country: Czech Republic
- Region: South Moravian
- District: Znojmo
- First mentioned: 1253

Area
  - Total: 5.58 km^{2} (2.15 sq mi)
- Elevation: 246 m (807 ft)

Population (2026-01-01)
  - Total: 221
  - Density: 39.6/km^{2} (103/sq mi)
- Time zone: UTC+1 (CET)
  - Summer (DST): UTC+2 (CEST)
- Postal code: 671 71
- Website: www.morasiceuznojma.cz

Morašice is a municipality and village in Znojmo District in the South Moravian Region of the Czech Republic. It has about 200 inhabitants.

Morašice lies approximately 18 kilometres (11 mi) north-east of Znojmo, 41 km (25 mi) south-west of Brno, and 181 km (112 mi) south-east of Prague.

== Demographics ==
Historical population
Year	Pop.	±%
1869	307	—
1880	339	+10.4%
1890	379	+11.8%
1900	372	−1.8%
1910	430	+15.6%
1921	439	+2.1%
1930	475	+8.2%
1950	437	−8.0%
1961	443	+1.4%
1970	418	−5.6%
1980	338	−19.1%
1991	276	−18.3%
2001	238	−13.8%
2011	236	−0.8%
2021	232	−1.7%
Source: Censuses
