= Morašice (Chrudim District) =

- Municipality
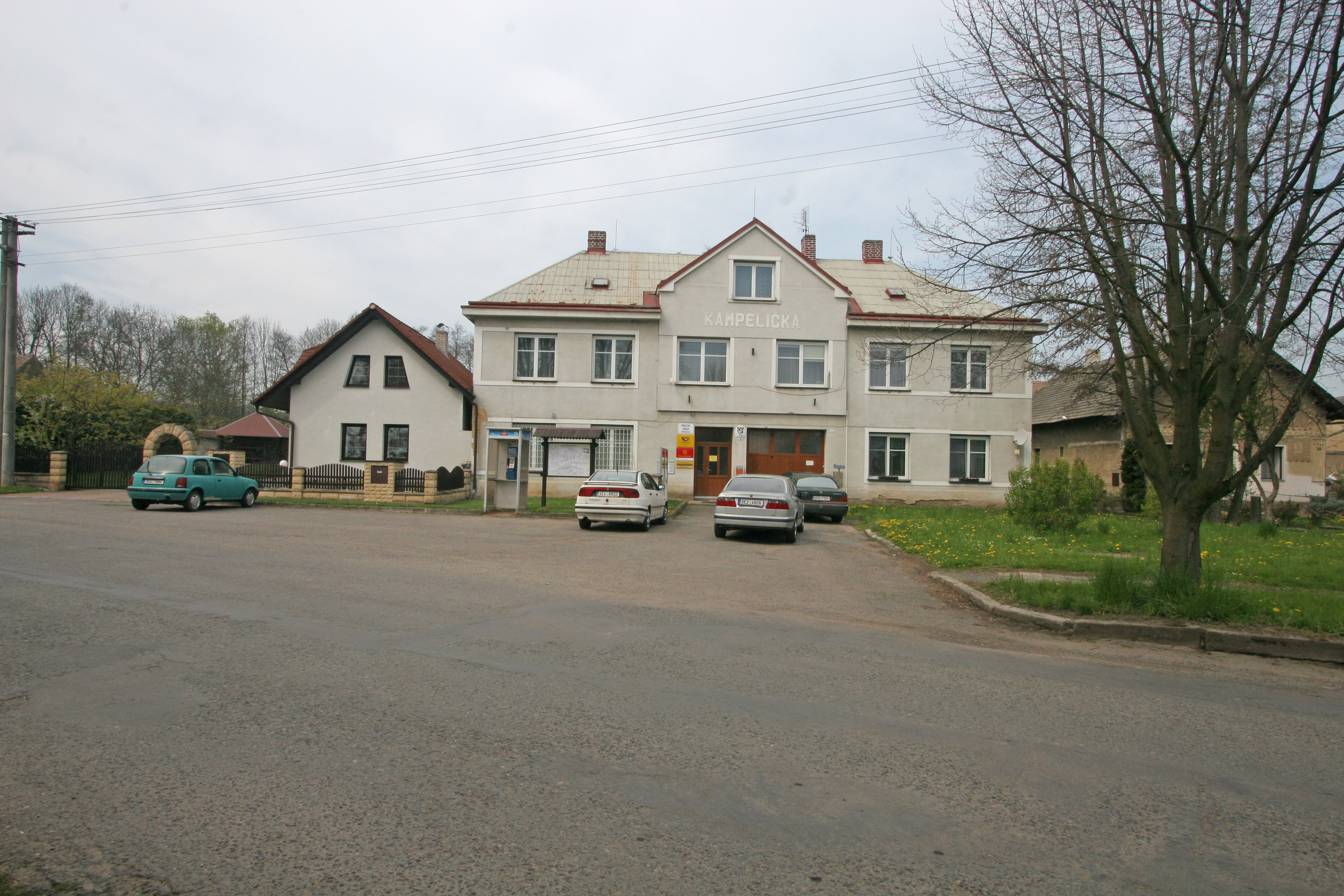
- Municipal office

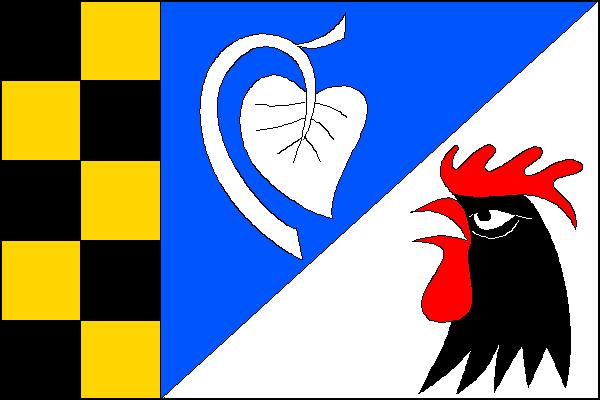
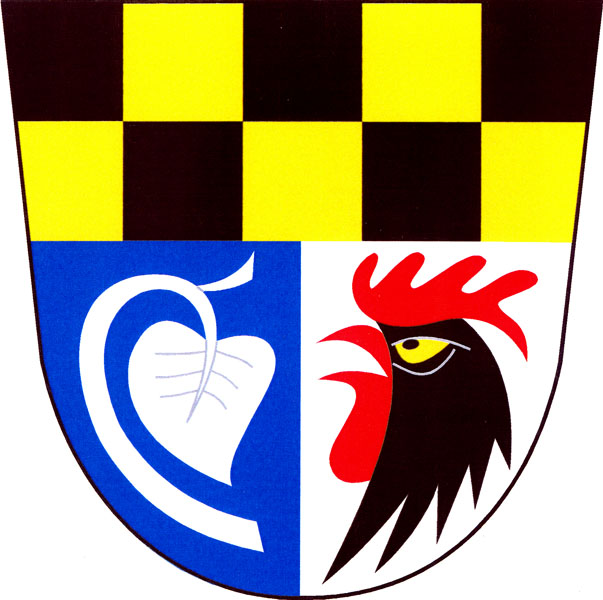
- Flag Coat of arms

- Location in the Czech Republic
- Coordinates: 49°56′5″N 15°42′32″E
- Country: Czech Republic
- Region: Pardubice
- District: Chrudim
- First mentioned: 1226

Area
  - Total: 13.01 km^{2} (5.02 sq mi)
- Elevation: 292 m (958 ft)

Population (2026-01-01)
  - Total: 824
  - Density: 63.3/km^{2} (164/sq mi)
- Time zone: UTC+1 (CET)
  - Summer (DST): UTC+2 (CEST)
- Postal codes: 538 02, 538 03, 538 21
- Website: www.obecmorasice.cz

Morašice is a municipality and village in Chrudim District in the Pardubice Region of the Czech Republic. It has about 800 inhabitants.

== Administrative division ==
Morašice consists of five municipal parts (in brackets population according to the 2021 census):

- Morašice (338)
- Holičky (105)
- Janovice (142)
- Skupice (89)
- Zbyhněvice (74)

== Demographics ==
Historical population
| Year | Pop. | ±% |
|---|---|---|
| 1869 | 1,120 | — |
| 1880 | 1,167 | +4.2% |
| 1890 | 1,166 | −0.1% |
| 1900 | 1,072 | −8.1% |
| 1910 | 1,030 | −3.9% |
| 1921 | 1,023 | −0.7% |
| 1930 | 921 | −10.0% |
| 1950 | 765 | −16.9% |
| 1961 | 787 | +2.9% |
| 1970 | 712 | −9.5% |
| 1980 | 640 | −10.1% |
| 1991 | 606 | −5.3% |
| 2001 | 588 | −3.0% |
| 2011 | 630 | +7.1% |
| 2021 | 748 | +18.7% |
Source: Censuses
