= Morašice (Svitavy District) =

- Municipality
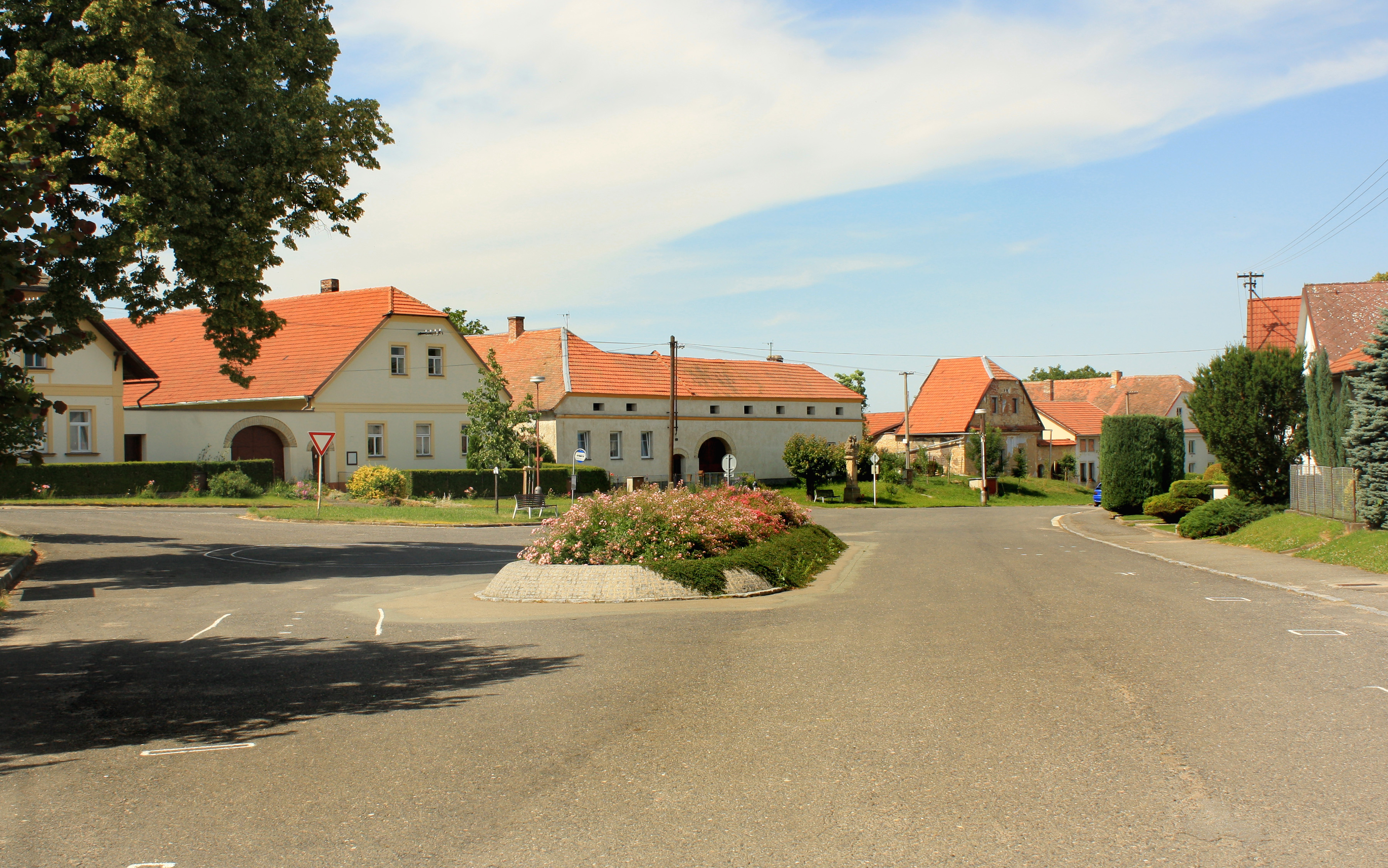
- Centre of Morašice

- Flag Coat of arms

- Location in the Czech Republic
- Coordinates: 49°52′4″N 16°14′1″E
- Country: Czech Republic
- Region: Pardubice
- District: Svitavy
- First mentioned: 1226

Area
  - Total: 12.42 km^{2} (4.80 sq mi)
- Elevation: 355 m (1,165 ft)

Population (2026-01-01)
  - Total: 740
  - Density: 60/km^{2} (150/sq mi)
- Time zone: UTC+1 (CET)
  - Summer (DST): UTC+2 (CEST)
- Postal codes: 569 51, 570 01
- Website: morasice.info

Morašice is a municipality and village in Svitavy District in the Pardubice Region of the Czech Republic. It has about 700 inhabitants.

Morašice lies approximately 22 kilometres (14 mi) north-west of Svitavy, 38 km (24 mi) south-east of Pardubice, and 132 km (82 mi) east of Prague.

== Administrative division ==
Morašice consists of four municipal parts (in brackets population according to the 2021 census):

- Morašice (453)
- Lažany (49)
- Řikovice (174)
- Višňáry (25)

== Demographics ==
Historical population
Year	Pop.	±%
1869	1,029	—
1880	1,036	+0.7%
1890	1,090	+5.2%
1900	1,084	−0.6%
1910	1,087	+0.3%
1921	1,055	−2.9%
1930	1,044	−1.0%
1950	808	−22.6%
1961	770	−4.7%
1970	678	−11.9%
1980	705	+4.0%
1991	703	−0.3%
2001	740	+5.3%
2011	663	−10.4%
2021	701	+5.7%
Source: Censuses
