= Dvory =

Dvory may refer to places:

== Czech Republic ==
- Dvory (Nymburk District), a municipality and village in the Central Bohemian Region
- Dvory (Prachatice District), a municipality and village in the South Bohemian Region
- Dvory, and administrative part of Karlovy Vary
- Dvory, a village and part of Loket in the Karlovy Vary Region
- Dvory nad Lužnicí, a municipality and village in the South Bohemian Region
- Hluboké Dvory, a municipality and village in the South Moravian Region
- Tři Dvory, a municipality and village in the Central Bohemian Region

== Russia ==
- Dvory, a in Teriberskaya Volost and later Alexandrovskaya Volost

== Slovakia ==
- Dvory, a part of Bratislava-Petržalka
- Dvory nad Žitavou, a municipality and village in the Nitra Region
