= Hluboké Dvory =

- Municipality
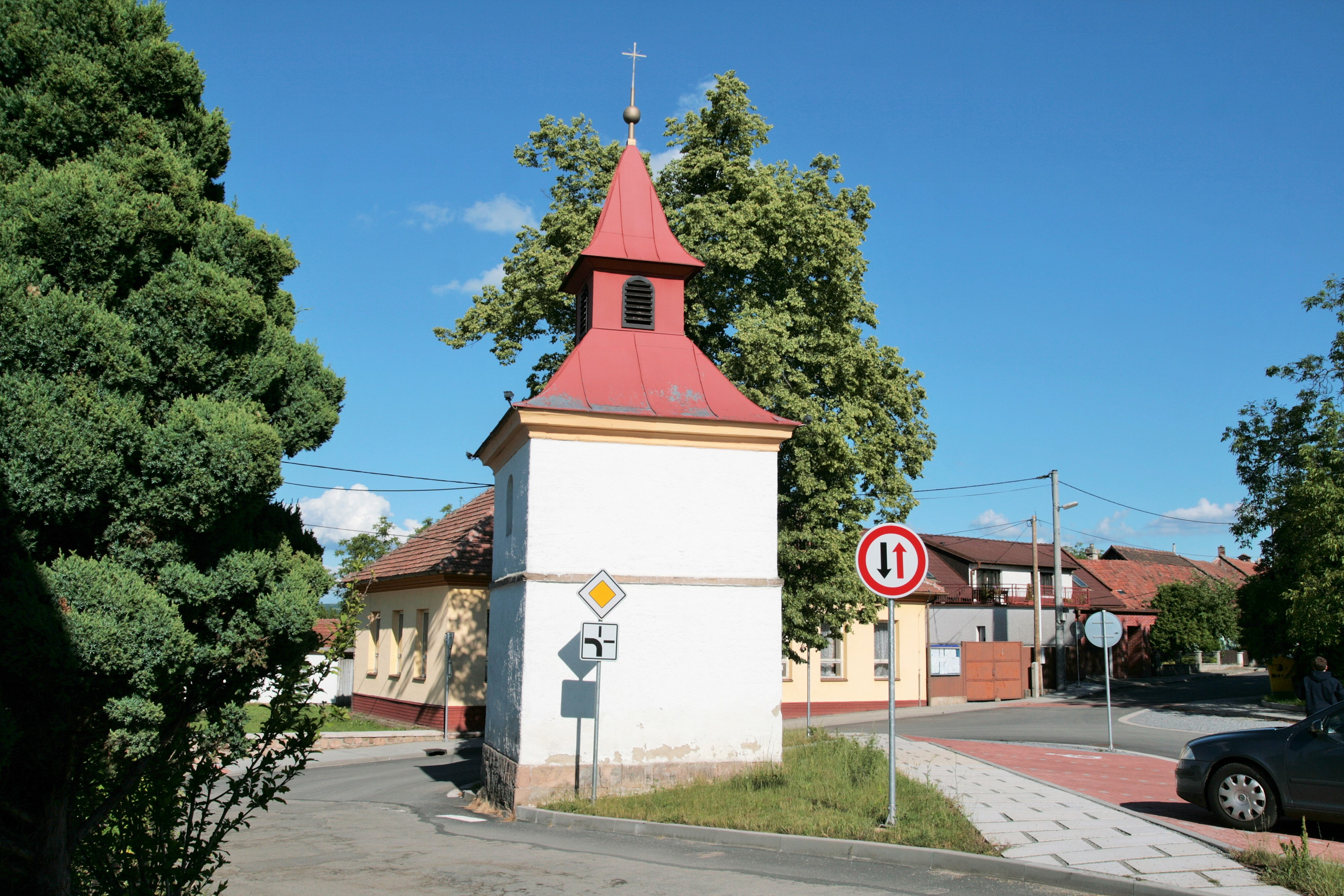
- Centre of Hluboké Dvory

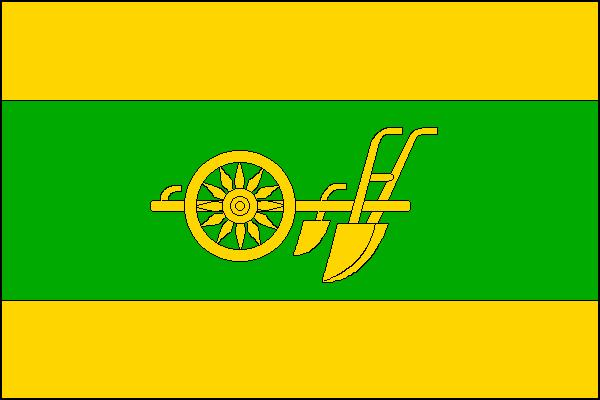
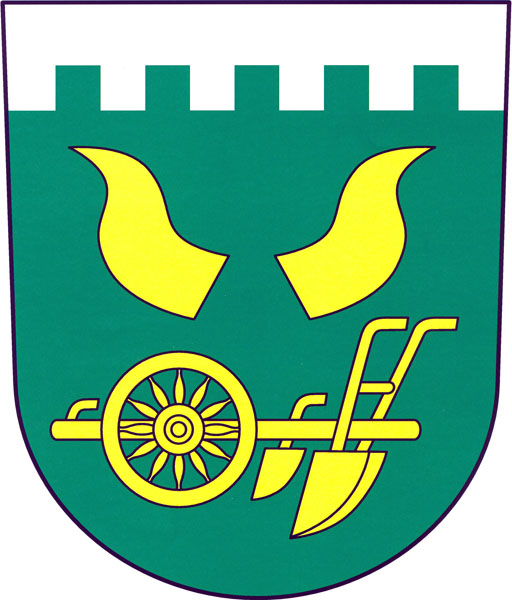
- Flag Coat of arms

- Location in the Czech Republic
- Coordinates: 49°22′59″N 16°30′51″E
- Country: Czech Republic
- Region: South Moravian
- District: Brno-Country
- First mentioned: 1349

Area
  - Total: 4.37 km^{2} (1.69 sq mi)
- Elevation: 405 m (1,329 ft)

Population (2026-01-01)
  - Total: 103
  - Density: 23.6/km^{2} (61.0/sq mi)
- Time zone: UTC+1 (CET)
  - Summer (DST): UTC+2 (CEST)
- Postal code: 679 23
- Website: www.hlubokedvory.cz

Hluboké Dvory is a municipality and village in Brno-Country District in the South Moravian Region of the Czech Republic. It has about 100 inhabitants.

Hluboké Dvory lies approximately 22 kilometres (14 mi) north of Brno and 171 km (106 mi) south-east of Prague.

== Demographics ==
Historical population
Year	Pop.	±%
1869	220	—
1880	227	+3.2%
1890	217	−4.4%
1900	223	+2.8%
1910	203	−9.0%
1921	212	+4.4%
1930	184	−13.2%
1950	161	−12.5%
1961	164	+1.9%
1970	140	−14.6%
1980	111	−20.7%
1991	85	−23.4%
2001	69	−18.8%
2011	78	+13.0%
2021	93	+19.2%
Source: Censuses
