= Tři Dvory =

- Municipality
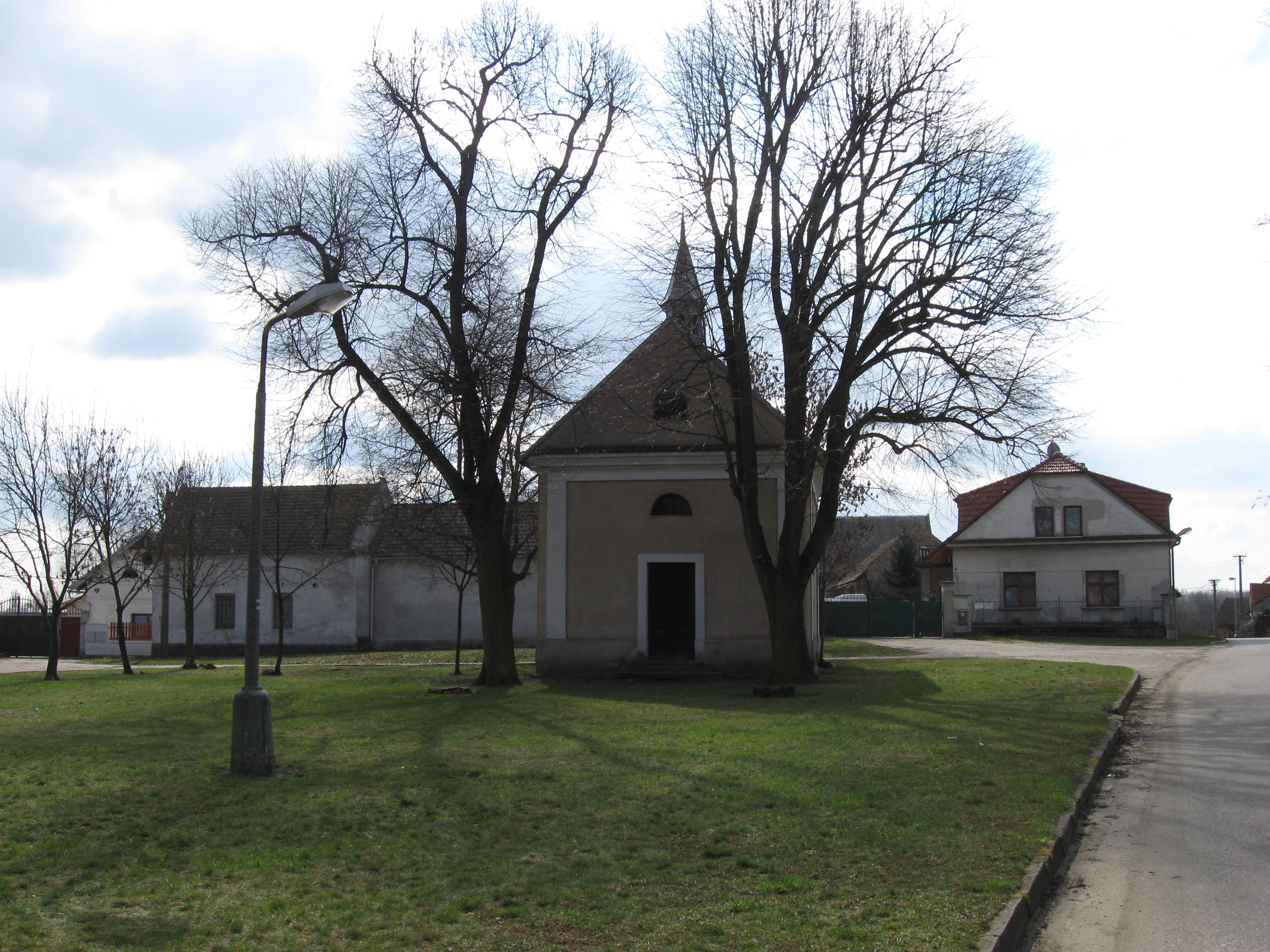
- Chapel of the Assumption of the Virgin Mary

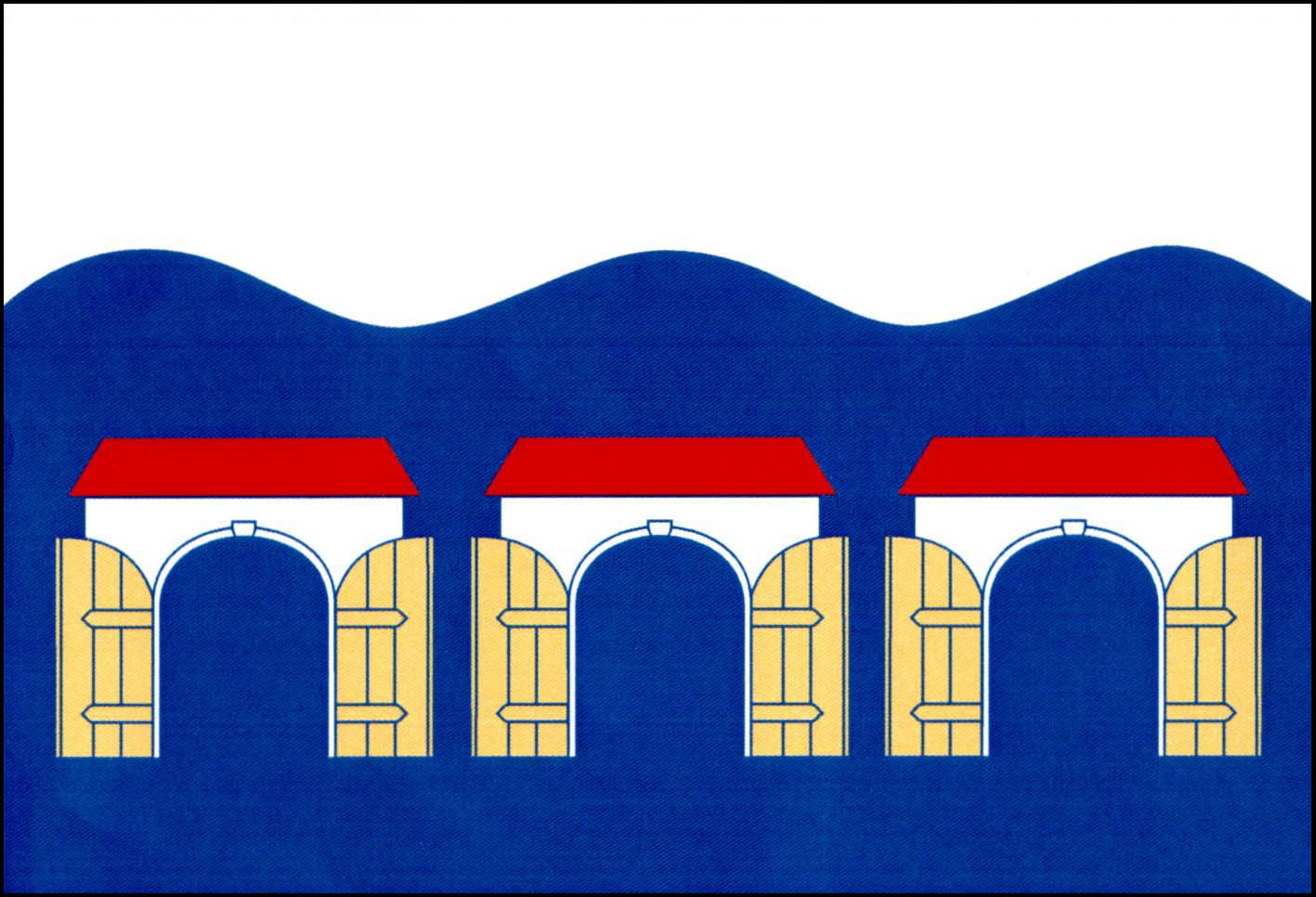
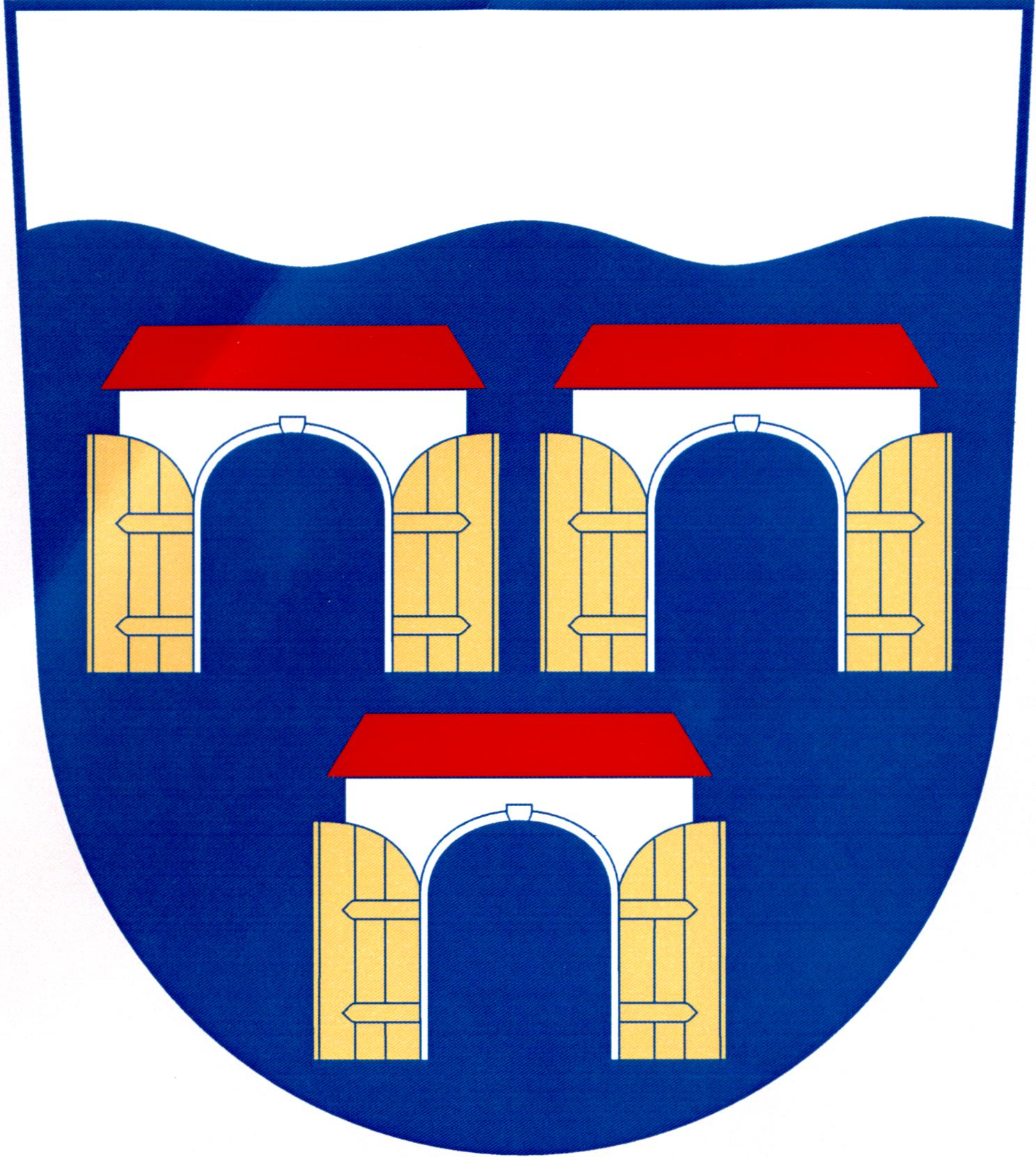
- Flag Coat of arms

- Location in the Czech Republic
- Coordinates: 50°1′55″N 15°15′24″E
- Country: Czech Republic
- Region: Central Bohemian
- District: Kolín
- First mentioned: 1387

Area
  - Total: 4.62 km^{2} (1.78 sq mi)
- Elevation: 197 m (646 ft)

Population (2026-01-01)
  - Total: 985
  - Density: 213/km^{2} (552/sq mi)
- Time zone: UTC+1 (CET)
  - Summer (DST): UTC+2 (CEST)
- Postal code: 280 02
- Website: www.tridvory.cz

Tři Dvory is a municipality and village in Kolín District in the Central Bohemian Region of the Czech Republic. It has about 1,000 inhabitants.

== Etymology ==
In Czech, the name Tři Dvory means 'three courtyards', 'three farmyards'.

== Geography ==
Tři Dvory is located about 4 kilometres (2 mi) east of Kolín and 51 km (32 mi) east of Prague. It lies mostly in the Central Elbe Table, only a small part of the municipal territory extends into the East Elbe Table. The highest point is near the top of the hill Na Vinici at 247 m (810 ft) above sea level. The southern municipal border is formed by the Elbe River.

== History ==
The first written mention of Tři Dvory is from 1387, when the village was bought by the town of Kolín. With the exception of the years 1547–1555, when the village was owned by the royal chamber, it belonged continuously to the town of Kolín until the establishment of an independent municipality in 1848. In 1690, Tři Dvory burned down after an arson attack, but was soon rebuilt. Until 1848, the village was agricultural, but then industry began to develop in Kolín and many people began to commute to work there.

== Demographics ==
Historical population

| Year | Pop. | ±% |
|---|---|---|
| 1869 | 444 | — |
| 1880 | 490 | +10.4% |
| 1890 | 577 | +17.8% |
| 1900 | 597 | +3.5% |
| 1910 | 593 | −0.7% |

| Year | Pop. | ±% |
|---|---|---|
| 1921 | 663 | +11.8% |
| 1930 | 769 | +16.0% |
| 1950 | 761 | −1.0% |
| 1961 | 819 | +7.6% |
| 1970 | 807 | −1.5% |

| Year | Pop. | ±% |
|---|---|---|
| 1980 | 913 | +13.1% |
| 1991 | 923 | +1.1% |
| 2001 | 857 | −7.2% |
| 2011 | 909 | +6.1% |
| 2021 | 970 | +6.7% |

Source: Censuses

== Transport ==
There are no railways or major roads passing through the municipality.

== Sights ==
There are no protected cultural monuments in the municipality. The main landmark of Tři Dvory is the Chapel of the Assumption of the Virgin Mary. It was built in 1891.
