= Dvory (Nymburk District) =

- Municipality
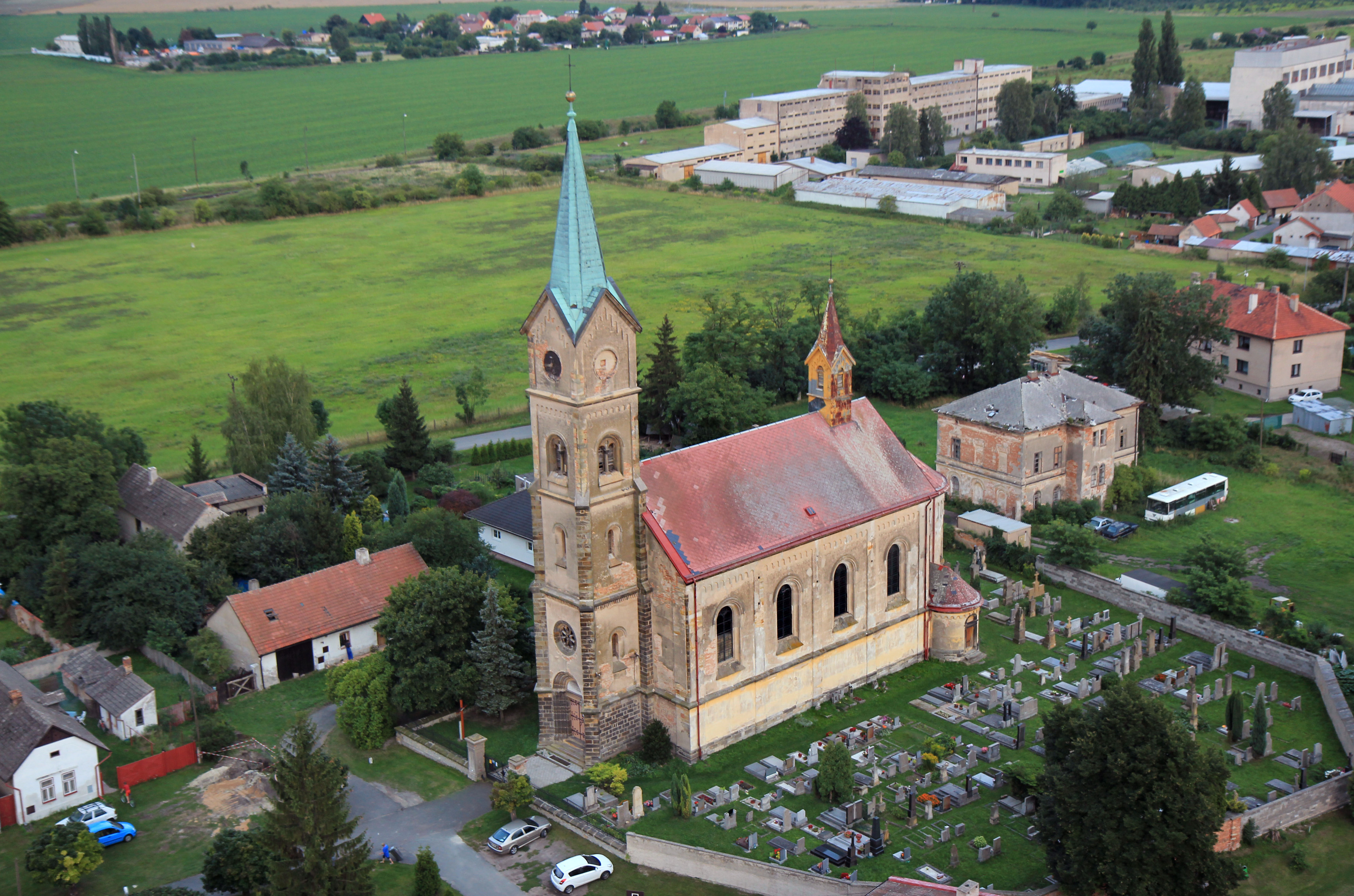
- Church of Saint Wenceslaus in Veleliby

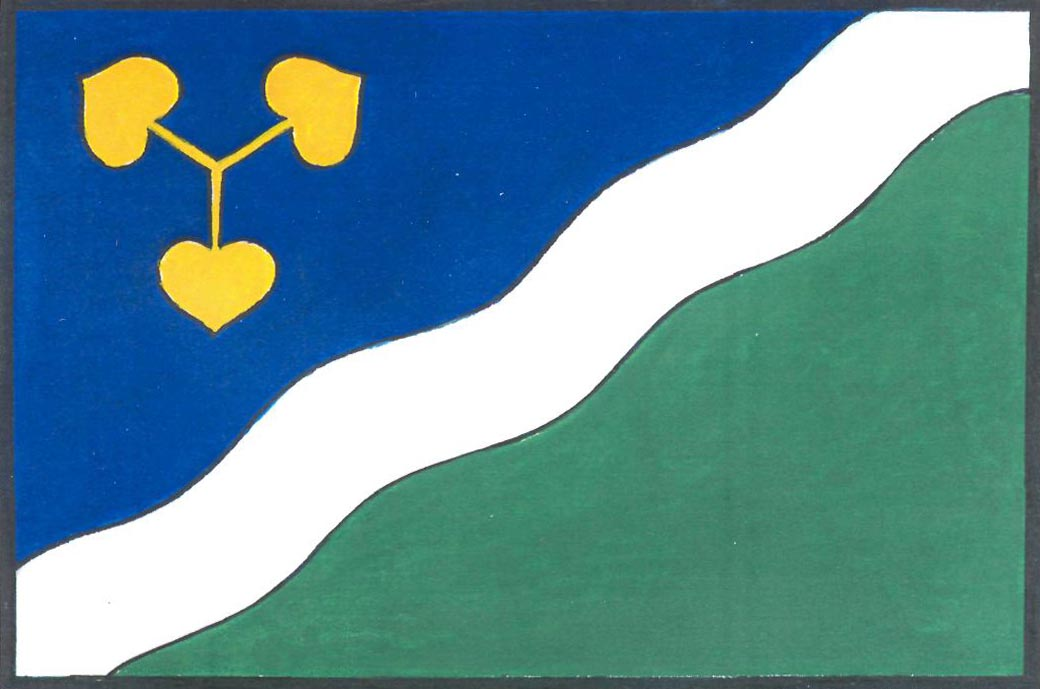
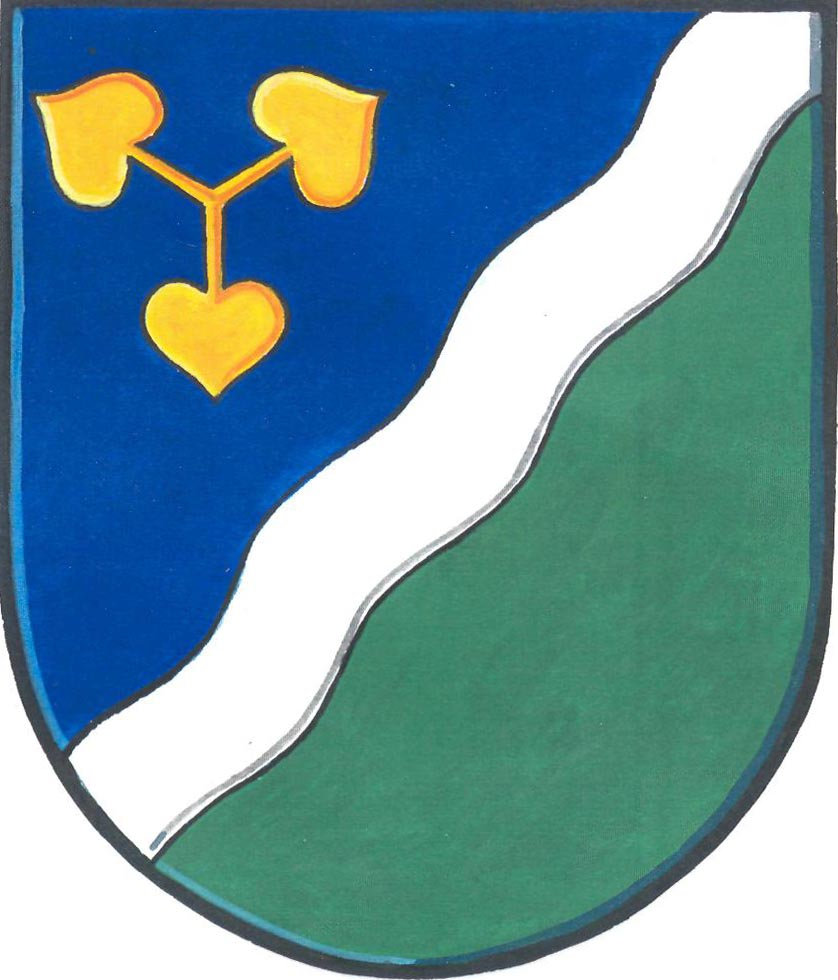
- Flag Coat of arms

- Location in the Czech Republic
- Coordinates: 50°12′42″N 14°59′44″E
- Country: Czech Republic
- Region: Central Bohemian
- District: Nymburk
- First mentioned: 1553

Area
  - Total: 6.79 km^{2} (2.62 sq mi)
- Elevation: 191 m (627 ft)

Population (2026-01-01)
  - Total: 619
  - Density: 91.2/km^{2} (236/sq mi)
- Time zone: UTC+1 (CET)
  - Summer (DST): UTC+2 (CEST)
- Postal code: 288 02
- Website: www.dvory-veleliby.cz

Dvory is a municipality and village in Nymburk District in the Central Bohemian Region of the Czech Republic. It has about 600 inhabitants.

== Administrative division ==
Dvory consists of two municipal parts (in brackets population according to the 2021 census):

- Dvory (376)
- Veleliby (171)

== Demographics ==
Historical population
Year	Pop.	±%
1869	353	—
1880	478	+35.4%
1890	556	+16.3%
1900	608	+9.4%
1910	584	−3.9%
1921	744	+27.4%
1930	766	+3.0%
1950	597	−22.1%
1961	666	+11.6%
1970	675	+1.4%
1980	641	−5.0%
1991	539	−15.9%
2001	531	−1.5%
2011	545	+2.6%
2021	547	+0.4%
Source: Censuses
