= Vracovice =

Vracovice may refer to places in the Czech Republic:

- Vracovice (Benešov District), a municipality and village in the Central Bohemian Region
- Vracovice (Znojmo District), a municipality and village in the South Moravian Region
- Vračovice, a village and part of Vračovice-Orlov in the Pardubice Region
