= Malovidy =

- Village
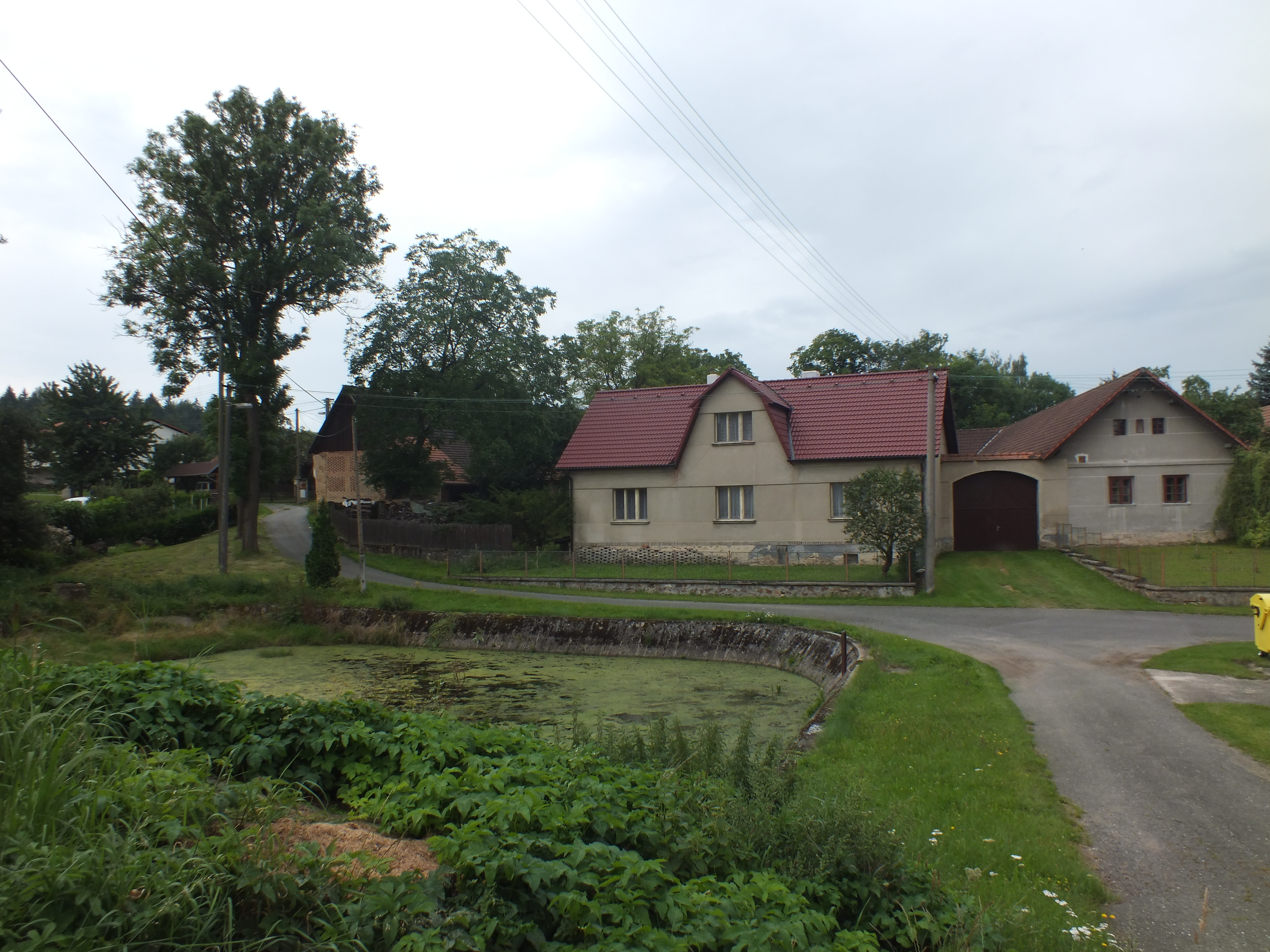
- Southern part of Malovidy

- Location in the Czech Republic
- Coordinates: 49°39′41″N 14°57′31″E
- Country: Czech Republic
- Region: Central Bohemian
- District: Benešov
- Municipality: Vracovice
- First mentioned: 1318

Area
  - Total: 1.85 km^{2} (0.71 sq mi)
- Elevation: 490 m (1,610 ft)

Population (2021)
  - Total: 108
  - Density: 58.4/km^{2} (151/sq mi)
- Time zone: UTC+1 (CET)
  - Summer (DST): UTC+2 (CEST)
- Postal code: 258 01

Malovidy is a village and municipal part of Vracovice in Benešov District in the Central Bohemian Region of the Czech Republic. It has about 100 inhabitants.

== Demographics ==
Historical population
Year	Pop.	±%
1869	141	—
1880	147	+4.3%
1890	166	+12.9%
1900	142	−14.5%
1910	167	+17.6%
1921	175	+4.8%
1930	142	−18.9%
1950	120	−15.5%
1961	124	+3.3%
1970	131	+5.6%
1980	125	−4.6%
1991	119	−4.8%
2001	127	+6.7%
2011	105	−17.3%
2021	108	+2.9%
Source: Censuses
