= Vracovice (Znojmo District) =

- Municipality
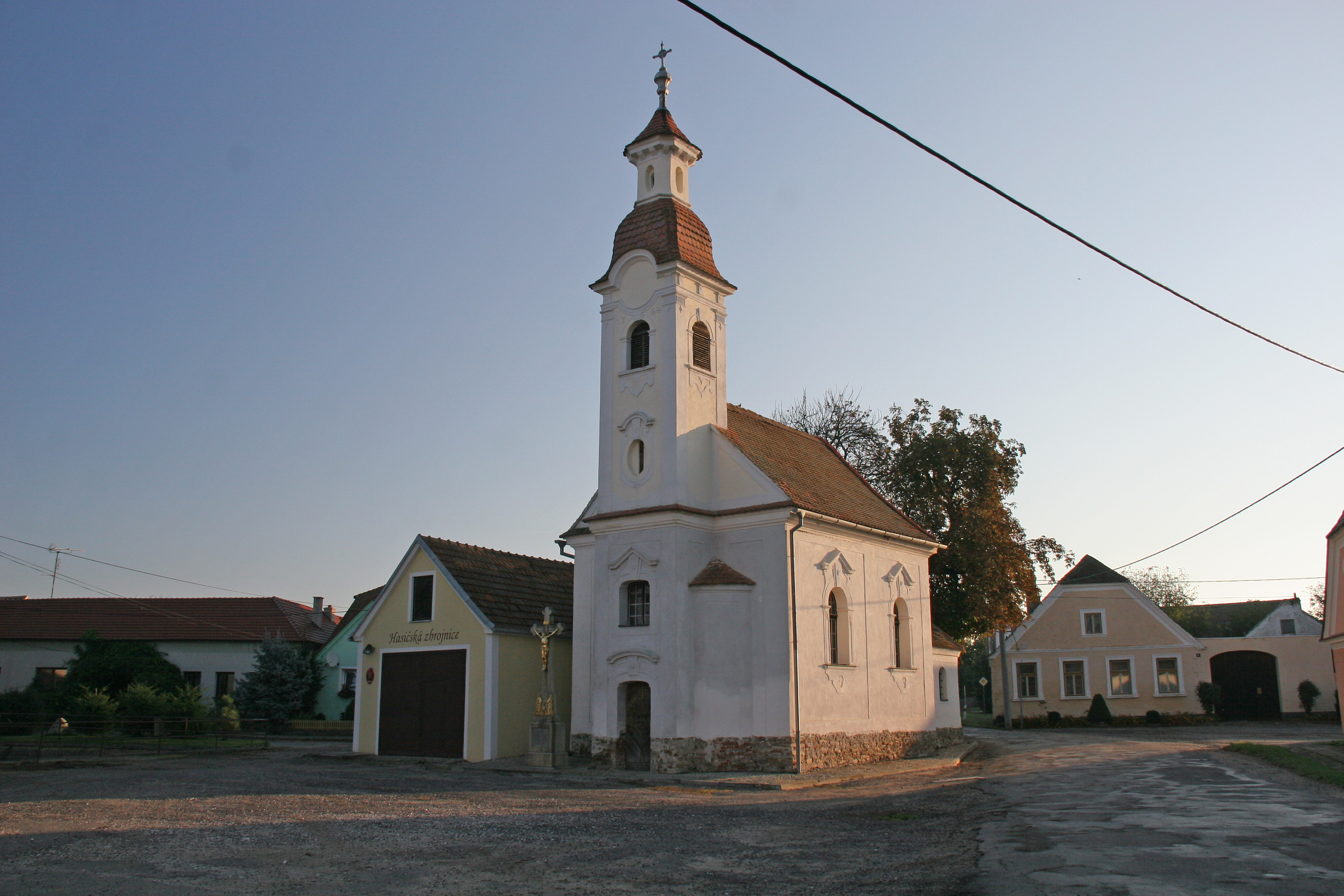
- Chapel of Saint Michael

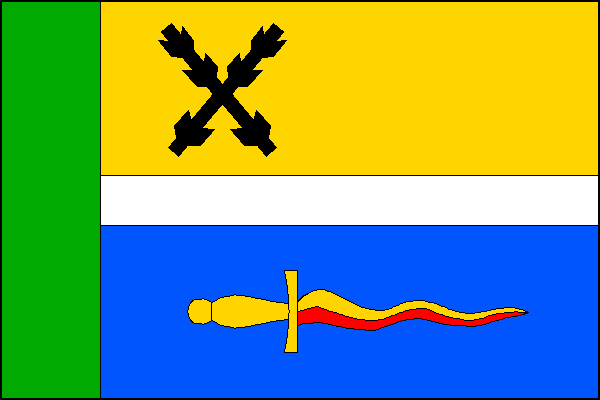
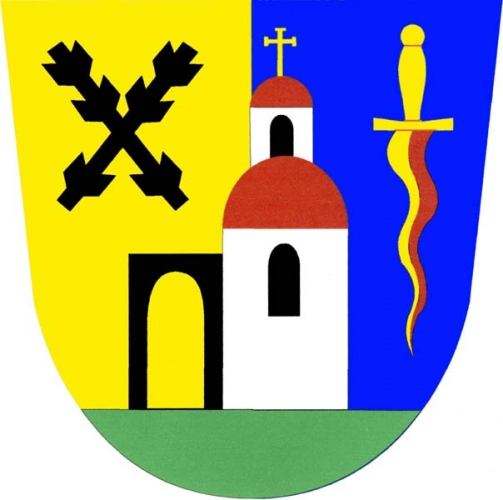
- Flag Coat of arms

- Location in the Czech Republic
- Coordinates: 48°54′8″N 15°53′55″E
- Country: Czech Republic
- Region: South Moravian
- District: Znojmo
- First mentioned: 1323

Area
  - Total: 6.04 km^{2} (2.33 sq mi)
- Elevation: 429 m (1,407 ft)

Population (2026-01-01)
  - Total: 190
  - Density: 31/km^{2} (81/sq mi)
- Time zone: UTC+1 (CET)
  - Summer (DST): UTC+2 (CEST)
- Postal code: 671 02
- Website: www.vracovice.cz

Vracovice is a municipality and village in Znojmo District in the South Moravian Region of the Czech Republic. It has about 200 inhabitants.

Vracovice lies approximately 12 kilometres (7 mi) north-west of Znojmo, 62 km (39 mi) south-west of Brno, and 170 km (110 mi) south-east of Prague.

== Demographics ==
Historical population
Year	Pop.	±%
1869	230	—
1880	245	+6.5%
1890	358	+46.1%
1900	376	+5.0%
1910	331	−12.0%
1921	276	−16.6%
1930	264	−4.3%
1950	174	−34.1%
1961	171	−1.7%
1970	170	−0.6%
1980	189	+11.2%
1991	199	+5.3%
2001	200	+0.5%
2011	200	+0.0%
2021	198	−1.0%
Source: Censuses

== Sights ==
The main landmark of Vracovice is the Chapel of Saint Michael. It was built in the late Baroque style in 1764 and extended in 1802.
