= Vracovice (Benešov District) =

- Municipality
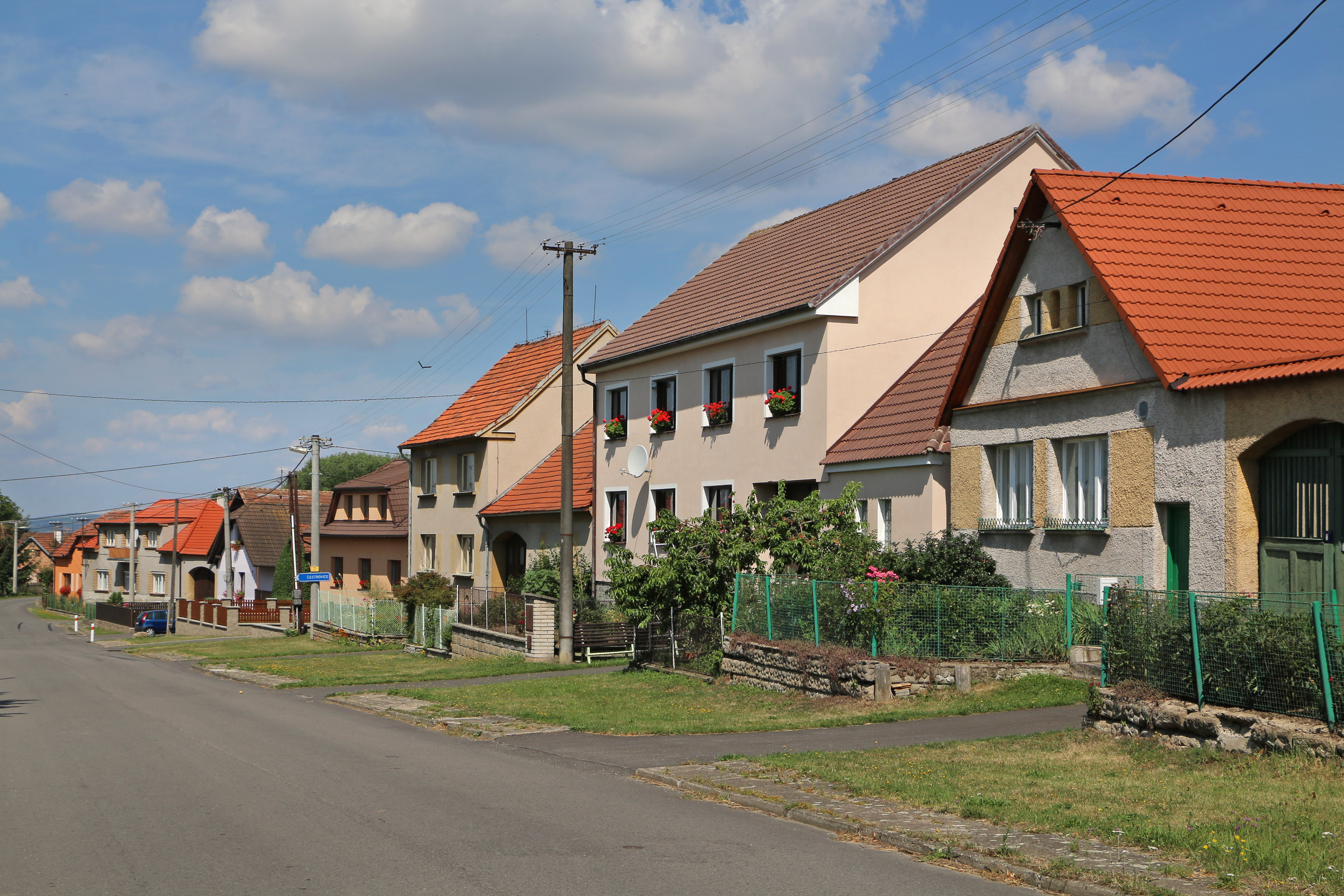
- Main street

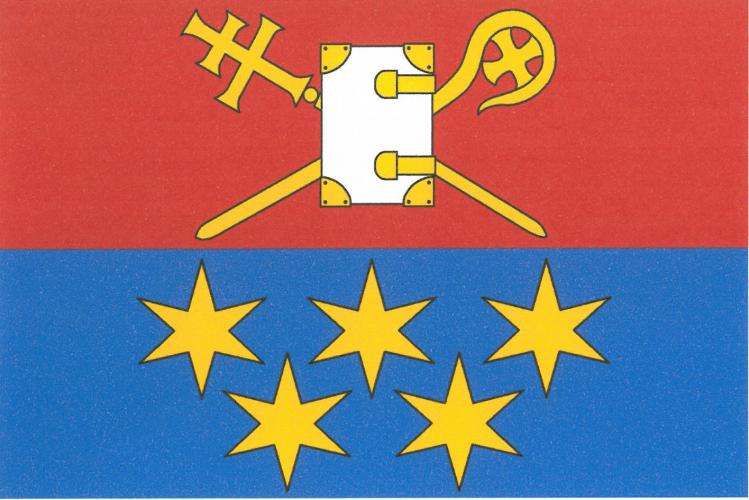
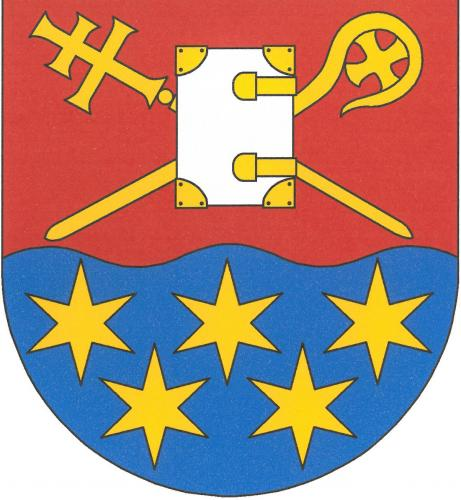
- Flag Coat of arms

- Location in the Czech Republic
- Coordinates: 49°39′45″N 14°55′56″E
- Country: Czech Republic
- Region: Central Bohemian
- District: Benešov
- First mentioned: 1318

Area
  - Total: 10.93 km^{2} (4.22 sq mi)
- Elevation: 500 m (1,600 ft)

Population (2026-01-01)
  - Total: 406
  - Density: 37.1/km^{2} (96.2/sq mi)
- Time zone: UTC+1 (CET)
  - Summer (DST): UTC+2 (CEST)
- Postal code: 258 01
- Website: www.obecvracovice.cz

Vracovice is a municipality and village in Benešov District in the Central Bohemian Region of the Czech Republic. It has about 400 inhabitants.

== Administrative division ==
Vracovice consists of two municipal parts (in brackets population according to the 2021 census):

- Vracovice (284)
- Malovidy (108)

== Demographics ==
Historical population
| Year | Pop. | ±% |
|---|---|---|
| 1869 | 503 | — |
| 1880 | 571 | +13.5% |
| 1890 | 536 | −6.1% |
| 1900 | 536 | +0.0% |
| 1910 | 523 | −2.4% |
| 1921 | 522 | −0.2% |
| 1930 | 469 | −10.2% |
| 1950 | 422 | −10.0% |
| 1961 | 400 | −5.2% |
| 1970 | 386 | −3.5% |
| 1980 | 389 | +0.8% |
| 1991 | 376 | −3.3% |
| 2001 | 379 | +0.8% |
| 2011 | 356 | −6.1% |
| 2021 | 392 | +10.1% |
Source: Censuses
