= Županovice =

Županovice may refer to places in the Czech Republic:

- Županovice (Jindřichův Hradec District), a municipality and village in the South Bohemian Region
- Županovice (Příbram District), a municipality and village in the Central Bohemian Region
