= Županovice (Příbram District) =

- Municipality
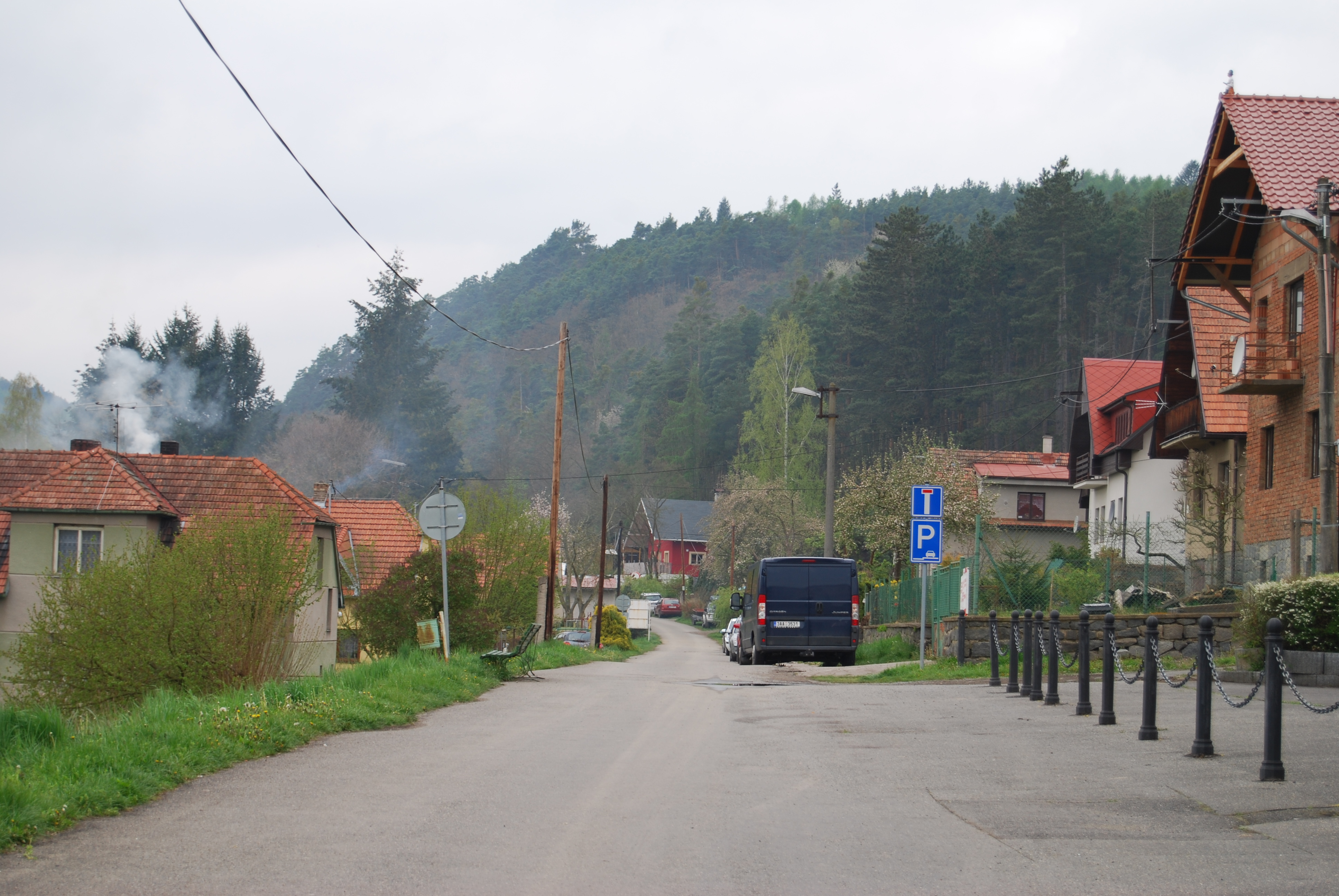
- A street in Županovice

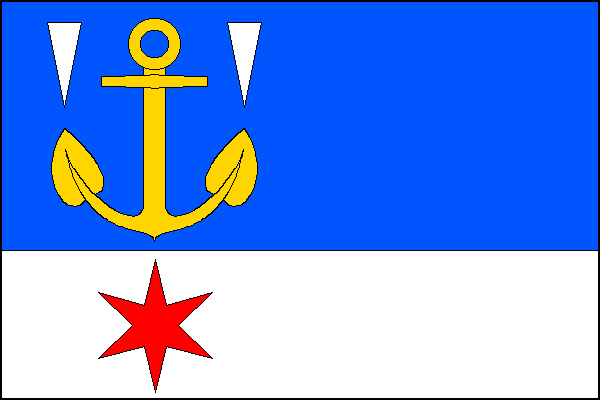
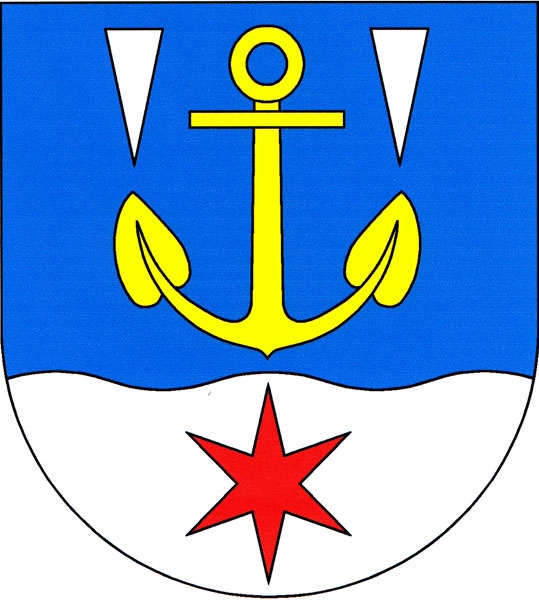
- Flag Coat of arms

- Location in the Czech Republic
- Coordinates: 49°42′28″N 14°17′56″E
- Country: Czech Republic
- Region: Central Bohemian
- District: Příbram
- First mentioned: 1235

Area
  - Total: 4.87 km^{2} (1.88 sq mi)
- Elevation: 295 m (968 ft)

Population (2026-01-01)
  - Total: 80
  - Density: 16/km^{2} (43/sq mi)
- Time zone: UTC+1 (CET)
  - Summer (DST): UTC+2 (CEST)
- Postal code: 263 01
- Website: www.obeczupanovice.cz

Županovice is a municipality and village in Příbram District in the Central Bohemian Region of the Czech Republic. It has about 80 inhabitants. It is known as a recreational area on the shore of Slapy Reservoir.

== Etymology ==
The name is derived either from the personal name Župan or from the word župan, meaning "the village of Župan's/župan's people".

== Geography ==
Županovice is located about 21 kilometres (13 mi) east of Příbram and 35 km (22 mi) south of Prague. It lies in the Benešov Uplands. The highest point is the hill Dějkov at 404 m (1,325 ft) above sea level. The municipality is situated on the shore of the Slapy Reservoir, built on the Vltava River.

== History ==
The first written mention of Županovice is from 1235, when Constance of Hungary donated the village to her daughter Agnes of Bohemia. Agnes bequeathed Županovice to the Knights of the Cross with the Red Star at St. Francis in Prague. They built a hospital here and remained the owners of the village until serfdom was abolished in 1848.

During the construction of the Slapy Reservoir in 1954, most of the historical part of the village was demolished and mostly new family houses remained.

== Demographics ==
Historical population

| Year | Pop. | ±% |
|---|---|---|
| 1869 | 264 | — |
| 1880 | 311 | +17.8% |
| 1890 | 299 | −3.9% |
| 1900 | 277 | −7.4% |
| 1910 | 276 | −0.4% |

| Year | Pop. | ±% |
|---|---|---|
| 1921 | 244 | −11.6% |
| 1930 | 242 | −0.8% |
| 1950 | 184 | −24.0% |
| 1961 | 109 | −40.8% |
| 1970 | 97 | −11.0% |

| Year | Pop. | ±% |
|---|---|---|
| 1980 | 80 | −17.5% |
| 1991 | 81 | +1.2% |
| 2001 | 81 | +0.0% |
| 2011 | 82 | +1.2% |
| 2021 | 79 | −3.7% |

Source: Censuses

== Economy ==
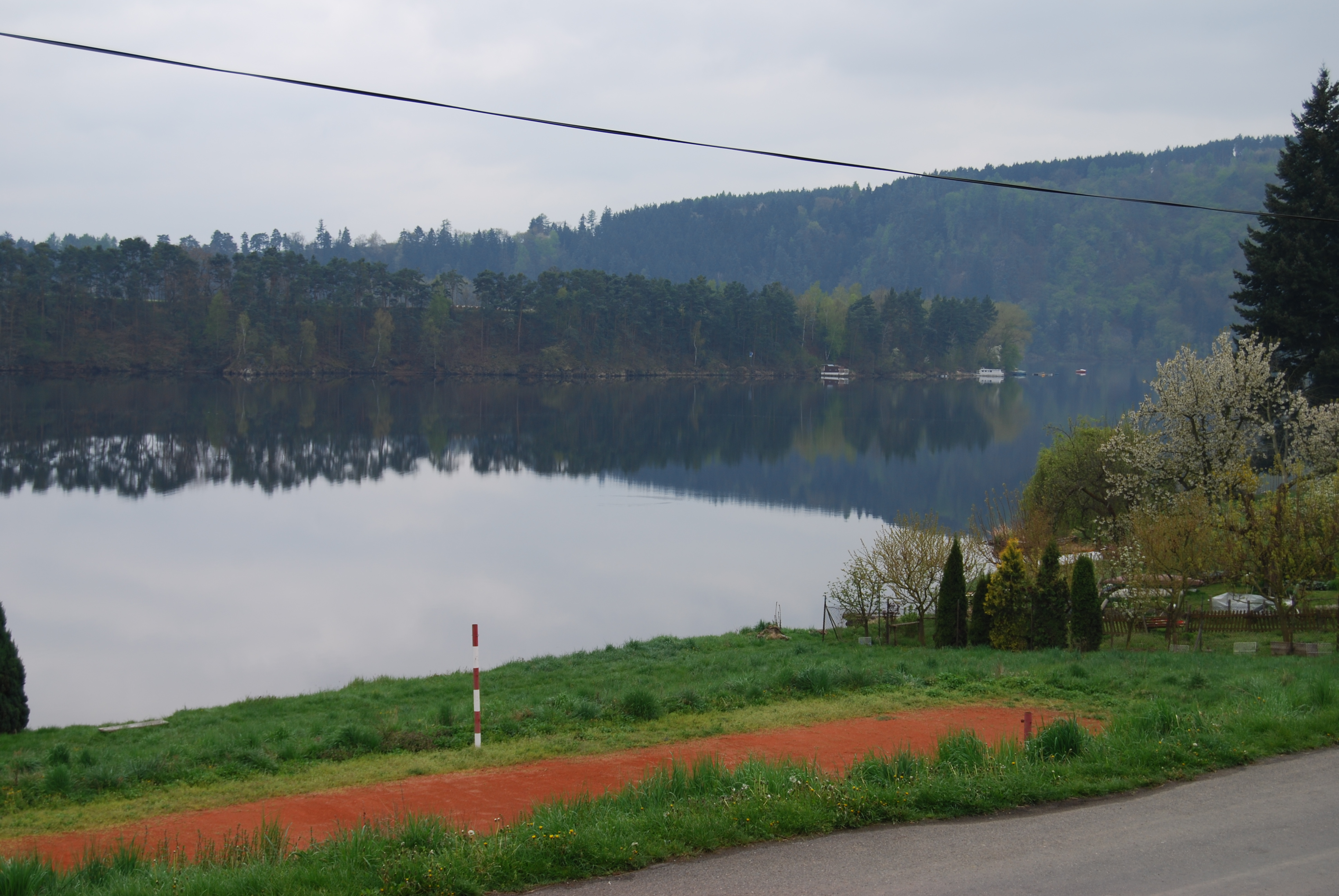
Slapy Reservoir in Županovice

Županovice is known as a recreational area. There are approximately 200 of recreational facilities, cottage hamlets and campsites.

== Transport ==
There are no railways or major roads passing through the municipality.

== Sights ==
There are no protected cultural monuments in the municipality.
