= Županovice (Jindřichův Hradec District) =

- Municipality
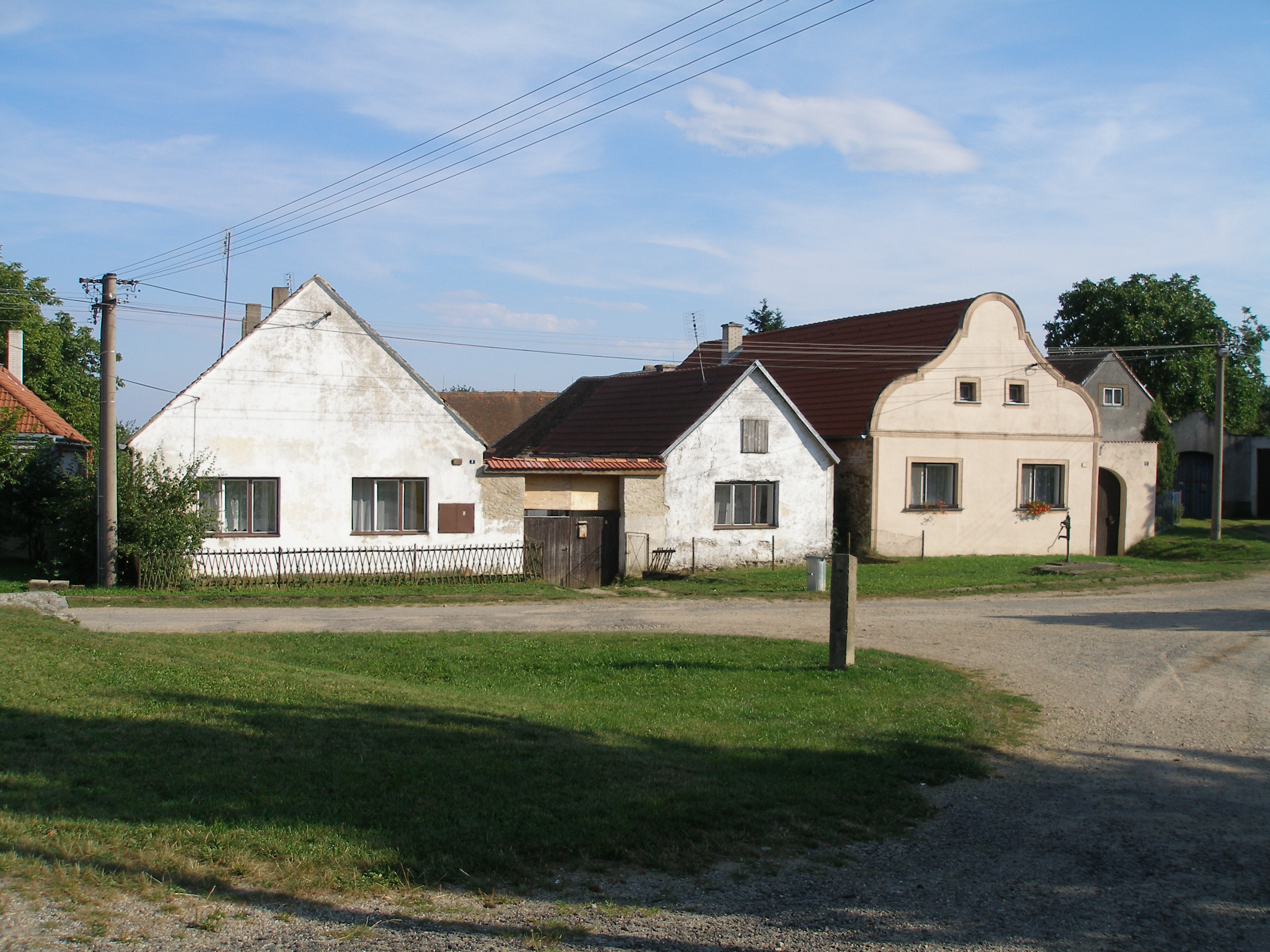
- Centre of Županovice

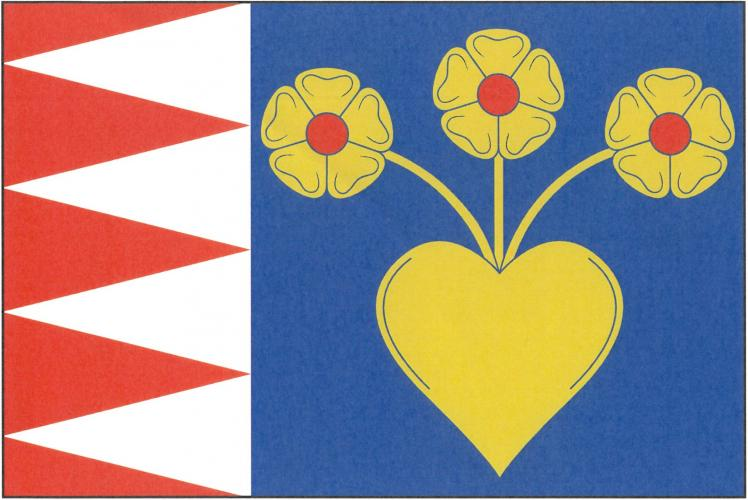
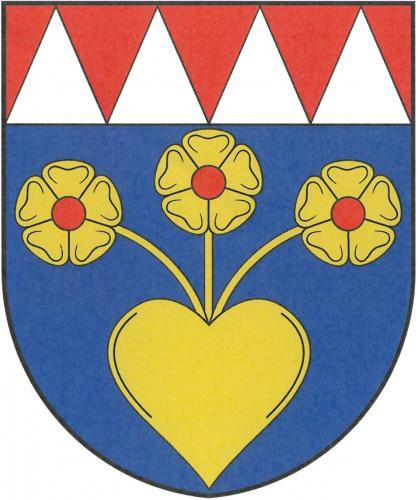
- Flag Coat of arms

- Location in the Czech Republic
- Coordinates: 48°57′26″N 15°30′22″E
- Country: Czech Republic
- Region: South Bohemian
- District: Jindřichův Hradec
- First mentioned: 1320

Area
  - Total: 4.48 km^{2} (1.73 sq mi)
- Elevation: 512 m (1,680 ft)

Population (2026-01-01)
  - Total: 50
  - Density: 11/km^{2} (29/sq mi)
- Time zone: UTC+1 (CET)
  - Summer (DST): UTC+2 (CEST)
- Postal code: 378 81
- Website: www.obec-zupanovice.cz

Županovice is a municipality and village in Jindřichův Hradec District in the South Bohemian Region of the Czech Republic. It has about 50 inhabitants.

Županovice lies approximately 43 kilometres (27 mi) south-east of Jindřichův Hradec, 75 km (47 mi) east of České Budějovice, and 148 km (92 mi) south-east of Prague.

== Demographics ==
Historical population
Year	Pop.	±%
1869	125	—
1880	122	−2.4%
1890	111	−9.0%
1900	104	−6.3%
1910	127	+22.1%
1921	123	−3.1%
1930	121	−1.6%
1950	90	−25.6%
1961	96	+6.7%
1970	91	−5.2%
1980	71	−22.0%
1991	54	−23.9%
2001	42	−22.2%
2011	61	+45.2%
2021	59	−3.3%
Source: Censuses
