= Volevčice =

Volevčice may refer to places in the Czech Republic:

- Volevčice (Jihlava District), a municipality and village in the Vysočina Region
- Volevčice (Most District), a municipality and village in the Ústí nad Labem Region
