= Volevčice (Most District) =

- Municipality
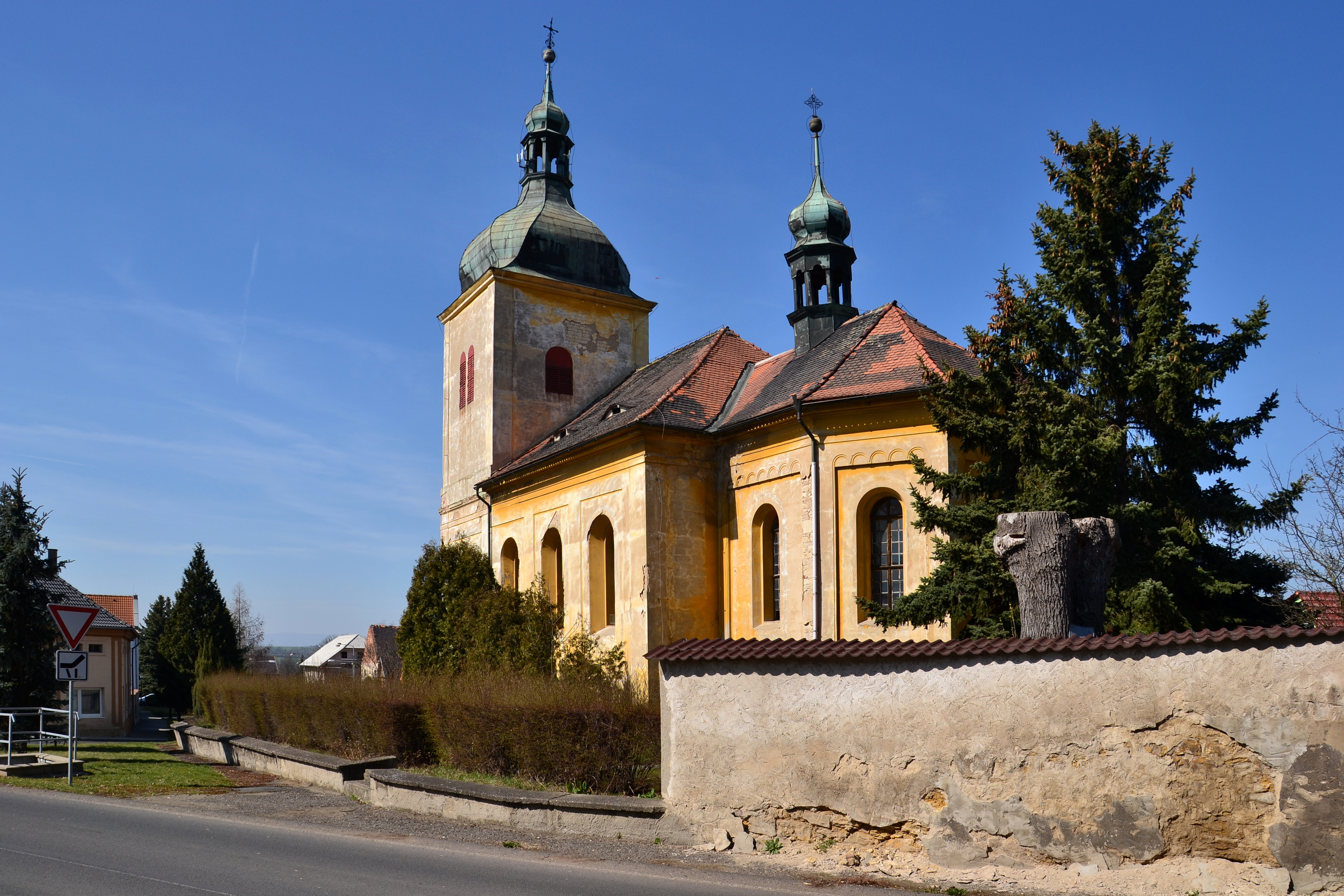
- Church of Saint Procopius

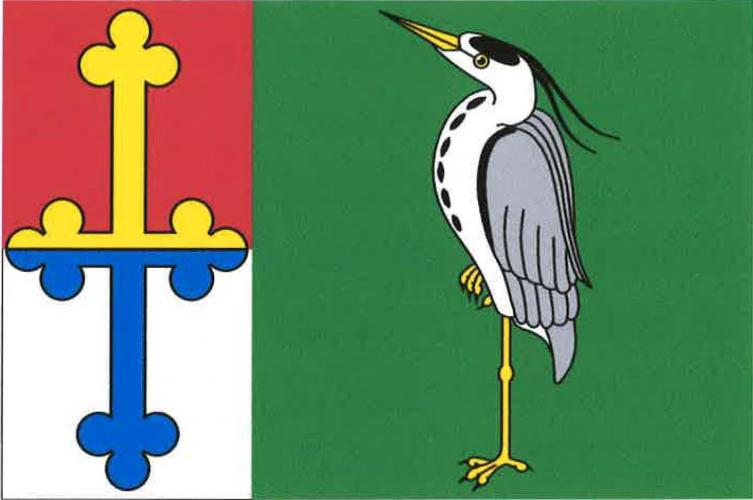
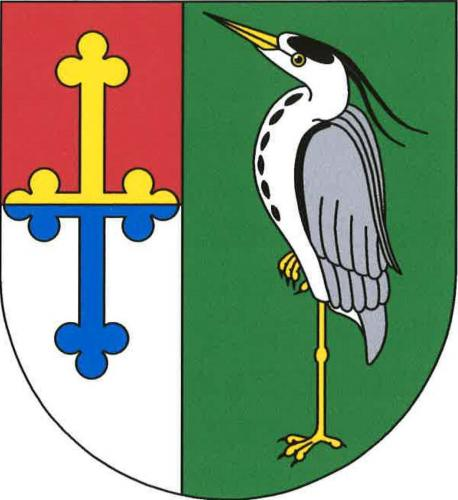
- Flag Coat of arms

- Location in the Czech Republic
- Coordinates: 50°26′6″N 13°41′26″E
- Country: Czech Republic
- Region: Ústí nad Labem
- District: Most
- First mentioned: 1333

Area
  - Total: 5.13 km^{2} (1.98 sq mi)
- Elevation: 219 m (719 ft)

Population (2026-01-01)
  - Total: 135
  - Density: 26.3/km^{2} (68.2/sq mi)
- Time zone: UTC+1 (CET)
  - Summer (DST): UTC+2 (CEST)
- Postal code: 434 01
- Website: www.volevcice.cz

Volevčice (German: Wolepschitz) is a municipality and village in Most District in the Ústí nad Labem Region of the Czech Republic. It has about 100 inhabitants.

Volevčice lies approximately 10 kilometres (6 mi) south-east of Most, 36 km (22 mi) south-west of Ústí nad Labem, and 65 km (40 mi) north-west of Prague.

== Demographics ==
Historical population
Year	Pop.	±%
1869	187	—
1880	228	+21.9%
1890	219	−3.9%
1900	245	+11.9%
1910	274	+11.8%
1921	232	−15.3%
1930	262	+12.9%
1950	192	−26.7%
1961	173	−9.9%
1970	176	+1.7%
1980	100	−43.2%
1991	76	−24.0%
2001	94	+23.7%
2011	89	−5.3%
2021	115	+29.2%
Source: Censuses
