= Volevčice (Jihlava District) =

- Municipality
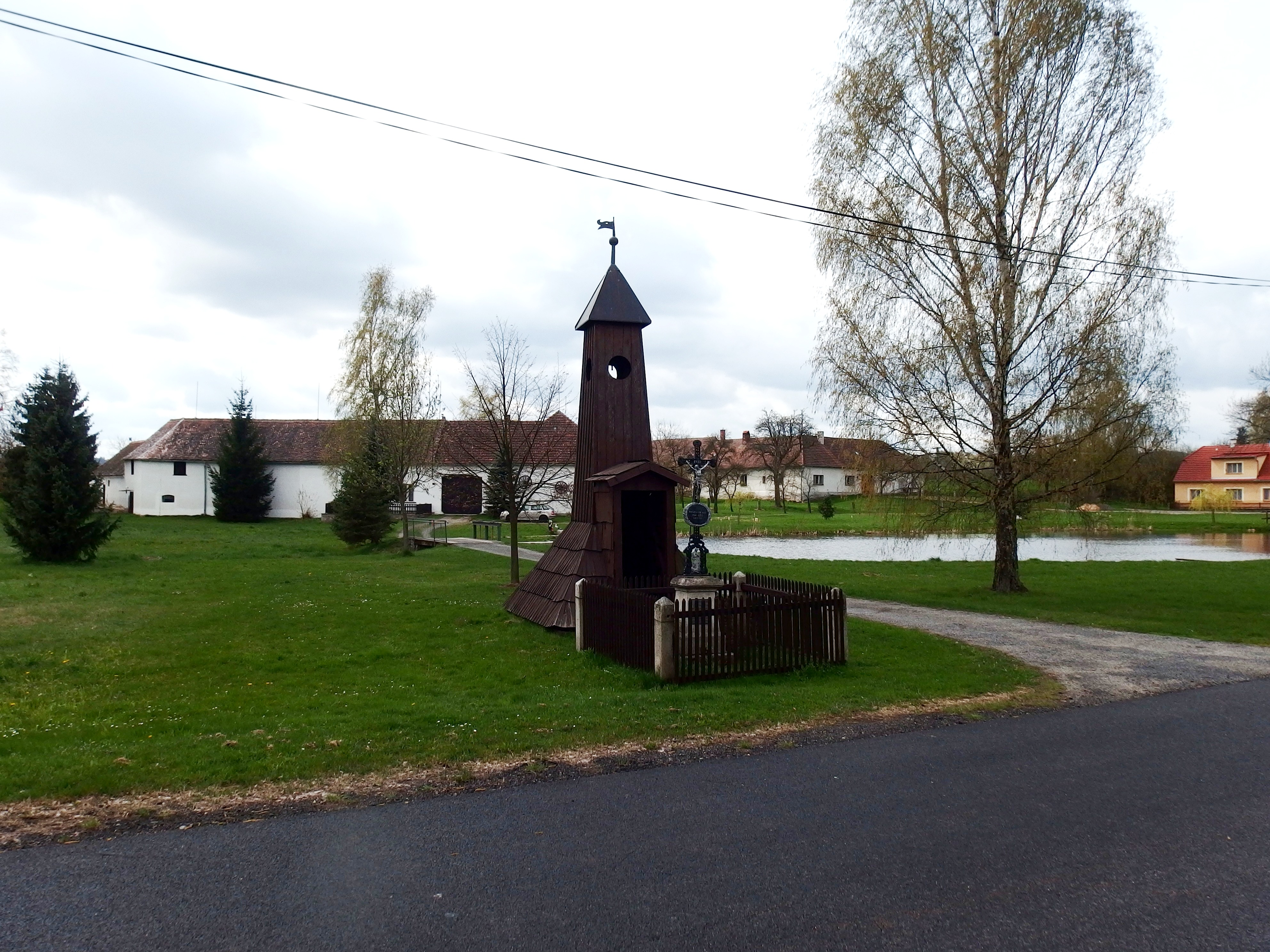
- Centre of Volevčice

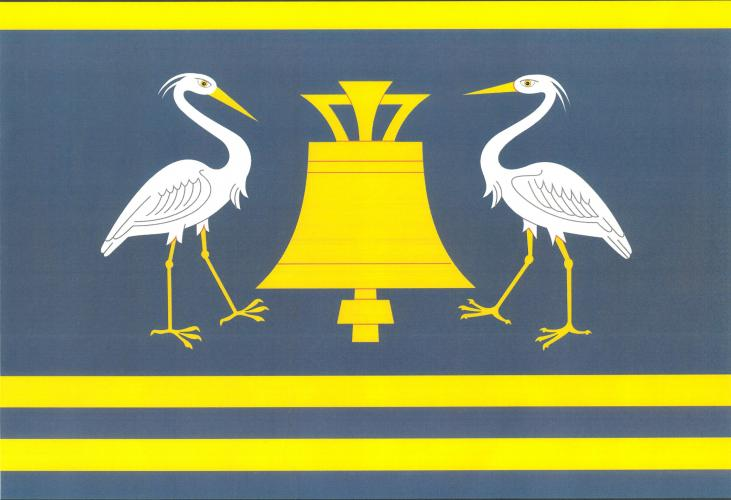
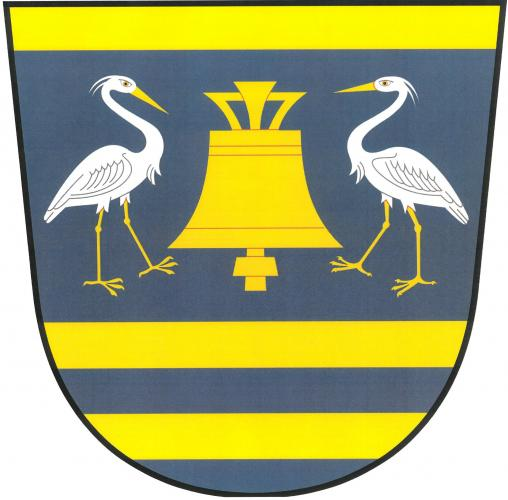
- Flag Coat of arms

- Location in the Czech Republic
- Coordinates: 49°12′40″N 15°26′41″E
- Country: Czech Republic
- Region: Vysočina
- District: Jihlava
- First mentioned: 1366

Area
  - Total: 3.32 km^{2} (1.28 sq mi)
- Elevation: 541 m (1,775 ft)

Population (2026-01-01)
  - Total: 70
  - Density: 21/km^{2} (55/sq mi)
- Time zone: UTC+1 (CET)
  - Summer (DST): UTC+2 (CEST)
- Postal code: 588 56
- Website: www.volevciceutelce.cz

Volevčice (Czech pronunciation: [ˈvolɛftʃɪtsɛ]) is a municipality and village in Jihlava District in the Vysočina Region of the Czech Republic. It has about 70 inhabitants.

Volevčice lies approximately 24 kilometres (15 mi) south-west of Jihlava and 122 km (76 mi) south-east of Prague.

== Demographics ==
Historical population
Year	Pop.	±%
1869	158	—
1880	166	+5.1%
1890	163	−1.8%
1900	153	−6.1%
1910	154	+0.7%
1921	164	+6.5%
1930	127	−22.6%
1950	97	−23.6%
1961	85	−12.4%
1970	87	+2.4%
1980	71	−18.4%
1991	57	−19.7%
2001	56	−1.8%
2011	47	−16.1%
2021	68	+44.7%
Source: Censuses
