= Katov =

Katov may refer to places:

- Katov (Brno-Country District), a municipality and village in the South Moravian Region, Czech Republic
- Katov (Tábor District), a municipality and village in the South Bohemian Region, Czech Republic
- Kátov, a municipality and village in Slovakia
