= Katov (Tábor District) =

- Municipality
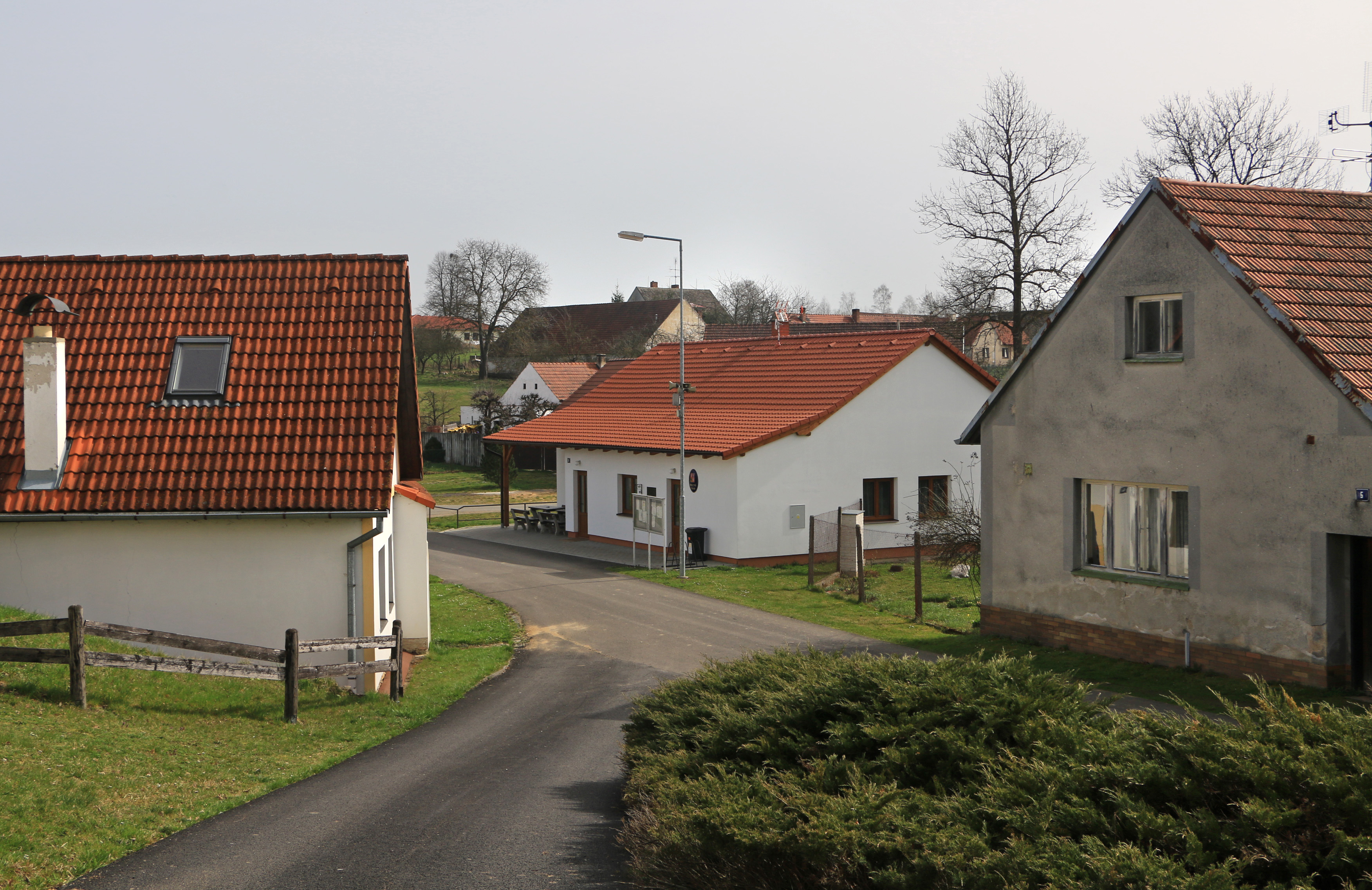
- Municipal office

- Location in the Czech Republic
- Coordinates: 49°16′54″N 14°49′43″E
- Country: Czech Republic
- Region: South Bohemian
- District: Tábor
- First mentioned: 1497

Area
  - Total: 3.71 km^{2} (1.43 sq mi)
- Elevation: 475 m (1,558 ft)

Population (2026-01-01)
  - Total: 70
  - Density: 19/km^{2} (49/sq mi)
- Time zone: UTC+1 (CET)
  - Summer (DST): UTC+2 (CEST)
- Postal code: 392 01
- Website: www.obeckatov.cz

Katov is a municipality and village in Tábor District in the South Bohemian Region of the Czech Republic. It has about 70 inhabitants.

Katov lies approximately 19 kilometres (12 mi) south-east of Tábor, 43 km (27 mi) north-east of České Budějovice, and 95 km (59 mi) south of Prague.

== Demographics ==
Historical population
Year	Pop.	±%
1869	216	—
1880	208	−3.7%
1890	230	+10.6%
1900	207	−10.0%
1910	191	−7.7%
1921	206	+7.9%
1930	184	−10.7%
1950	147	−20.1%
1961	163	+10.9%
1970	140	−14.1%
1980	124	−11.4%
1991	96	−22.6%
2001	80	−16.7%
2011	67	−16.2%
2021	72	+7.5%
Source: Censuses
