= Katov (Brno-Country District) =

- Municipality
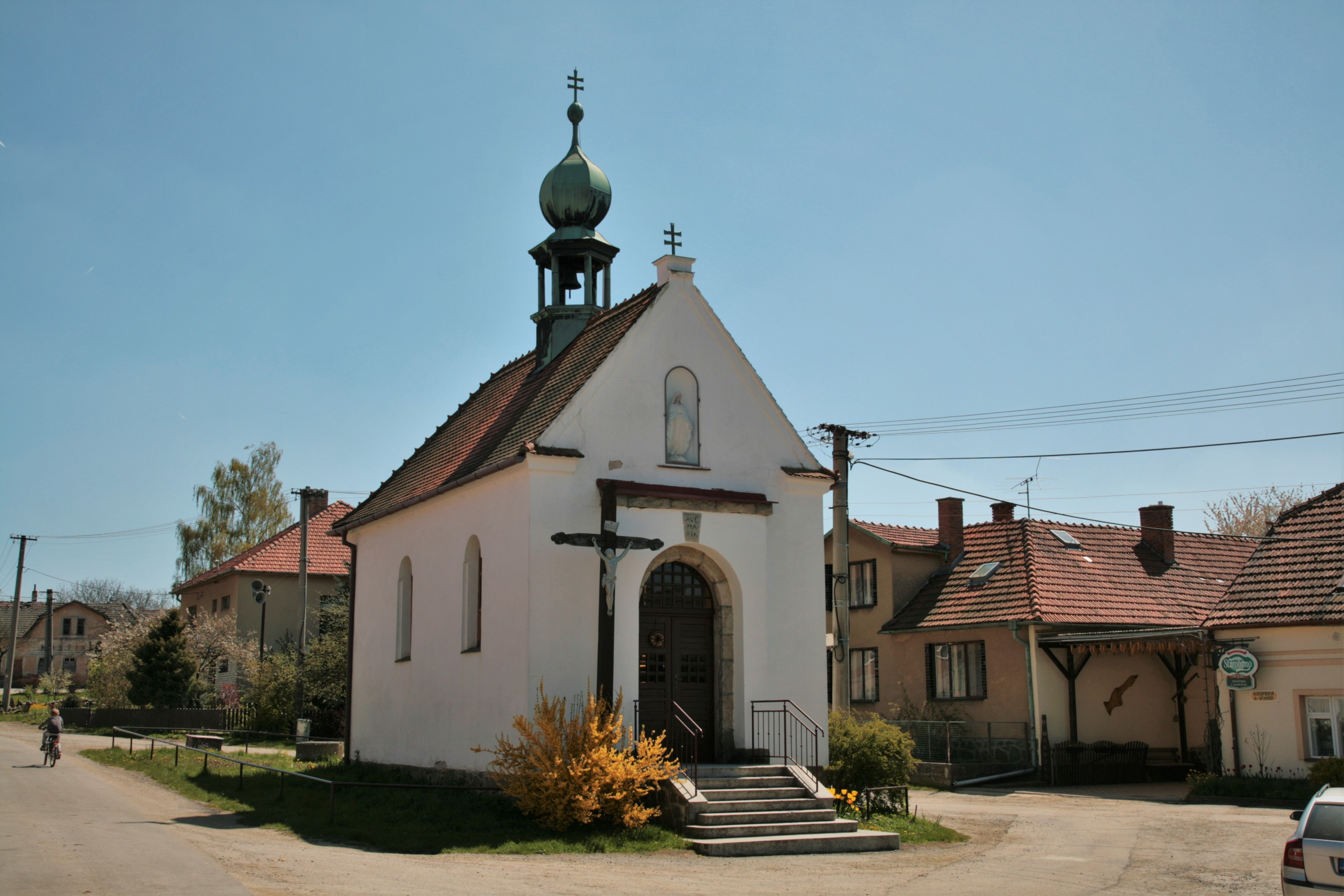
- Chapel of the Nativity of the Virgin Mary

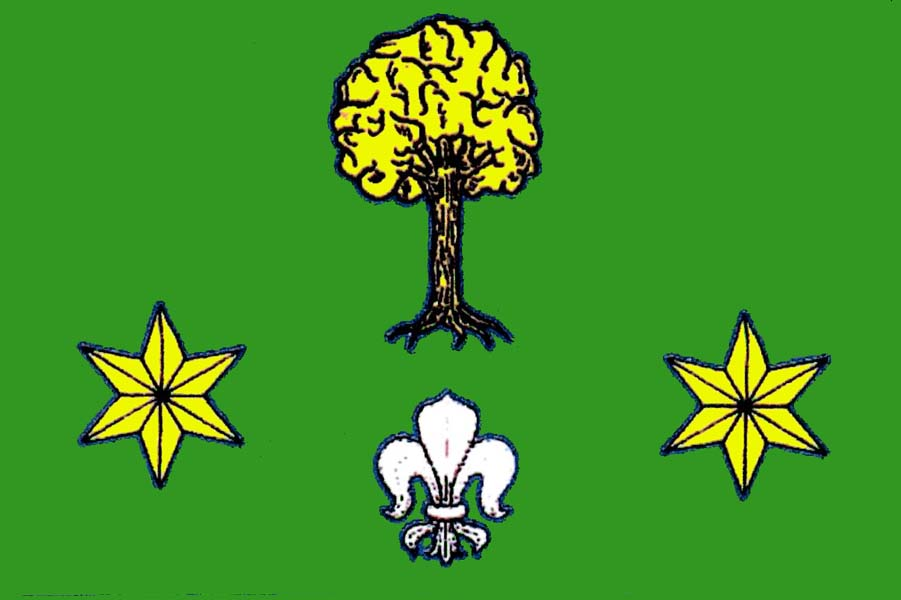
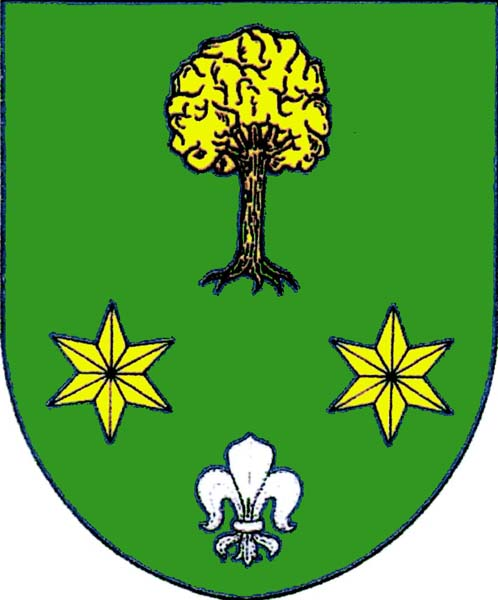
- Flag Coat of arms

- Location in the Czech Republic
- Coordinates: 49°19′58″N 16°16′44″E
- Country: Czech Republic
- Region: South Moravian
- District: Brno-Country
- First mentioned: 1390

Area
  - Total: 3.00 km^{2} (1.16 sq mi)
- Elevation: 474 m (1,555 ft)

Population (2026-01-01)
  - Total: 273
  - Density: 91.0/km^{2} (236/sq mi)
- Time zone: UTC+1 (CET)
  - Summer (DST): UTC+2 (CEST)
- Postal code: 594 55
- Website: www.katov.cz

Katov is a municipality and village in Brno-Country District in the South Moravian Region of the Czech Republic. It has about 300 inhabitants.

Katov lies approximately 29 kilometres (18 mi) north-west of Brno and 159 km (99 mi) south-east of Prague.

== Demographics ==
Historical population
Year	Pop.	±%
1869	254	—
1880	268	+5.5%
1890	247	−7.8%
1900	254	+2.8%
1910	222	−12.6%
1921	205	−7.7%
1930	212	+3.4%
1950	197	−7.1%
1961	213	+8.1%
1970	207	−2.8%
1980	181	−12.6%
1991	189	+4.4%
2001	196	+3.7%
2011	201	+2.6%
2021	265	+31.8%
Source: Censuses
