= Bukovka =

- Municipality
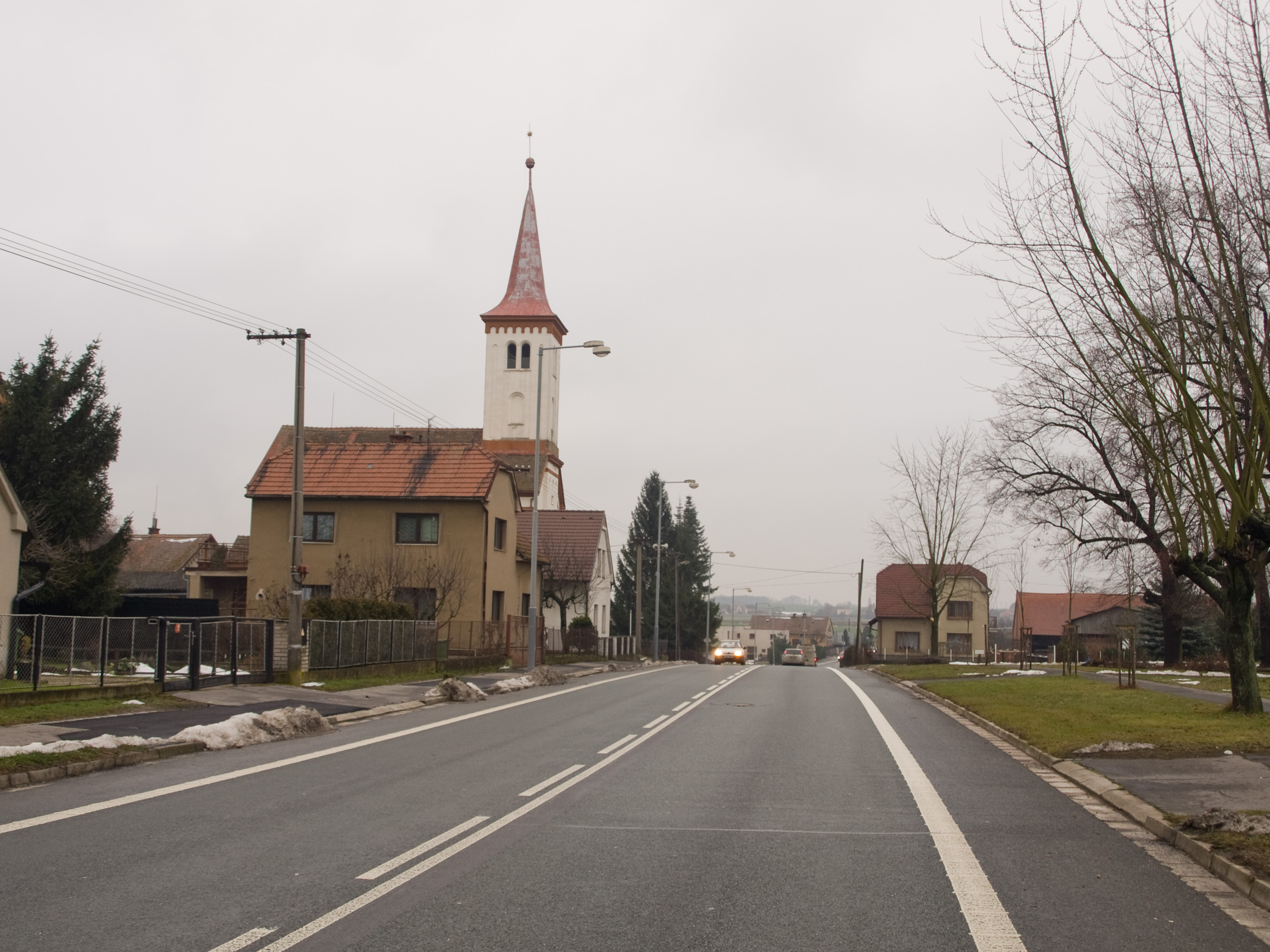
- Main road

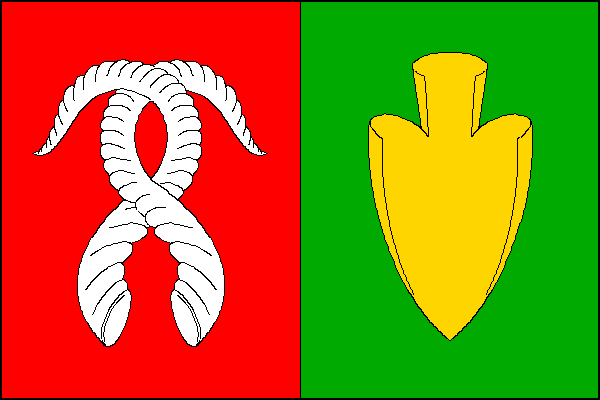
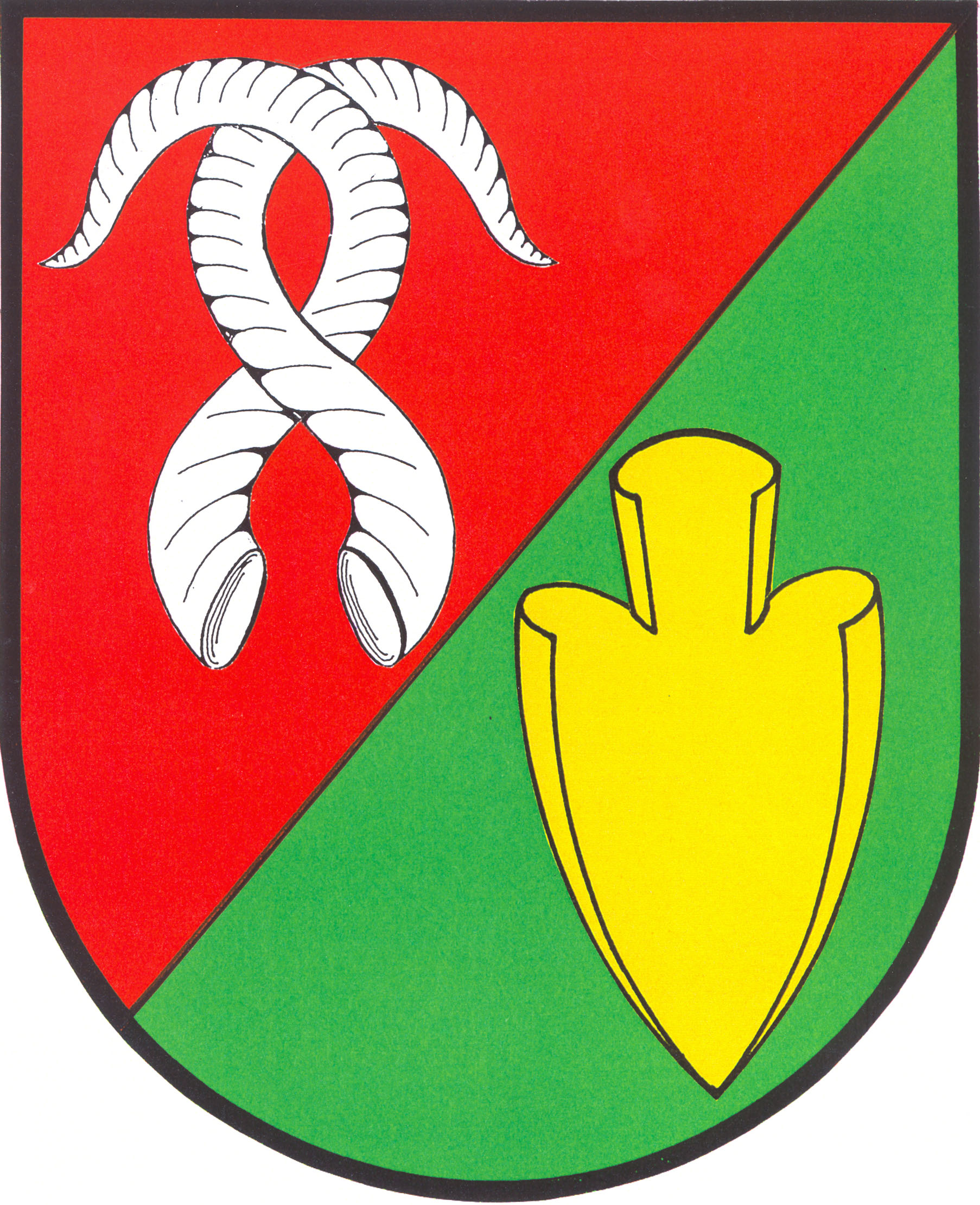
- Flag Coat of arms

- Location in the Czech Republic
- Coordinates: 50°6′4″N 15°37′31″E
- Country: Czech Republic
- Region: Pardubice
- District: Pardubice
- First mentioned: 1400

Area
  - Total: 5.55 km^{2} (2.14 sq mi)
- Elevation: 237 m (778 ft)

Population (2026-01-01)
  - Total: 401
  - Density: 72.3/km^{2} (187/sq mi)
- Time zone: UTC+1 (CET)
  - Summer (DST): UTC+2 (CEST)
- Postal code: 533 41
- Website: www.bukovka.cz

Bukovka is a municipality and village in Pardubice District in the Pardubice Region of the Czech Republic. It has about 400 inhabitants.

== Administrative division ==
Bukovka consists of two municipal parts (in brackets population according to the 2021 census):

- Bukovka (252)
- Habřinka (130)

== Demographics ==
Historical population
Year	Pop.	±%
1869	466	—
1880	471	+1.1%
1890	485	+3.0%
1900	418	−13.8%
1910	418	+0.0%
1921	401	−4.1%
1930	371	−7.5%
1950	323	−12.9%
1961	330	+2.2%
1970	331	+0.3%
1980	346	+4.5%
1991	388	+12.1%
2001	395	+1.8%
2011	374	−5.3%
2021	382	+2.1%
Source: Censuses
