= Hostín u Vojkovic =

- Municipality
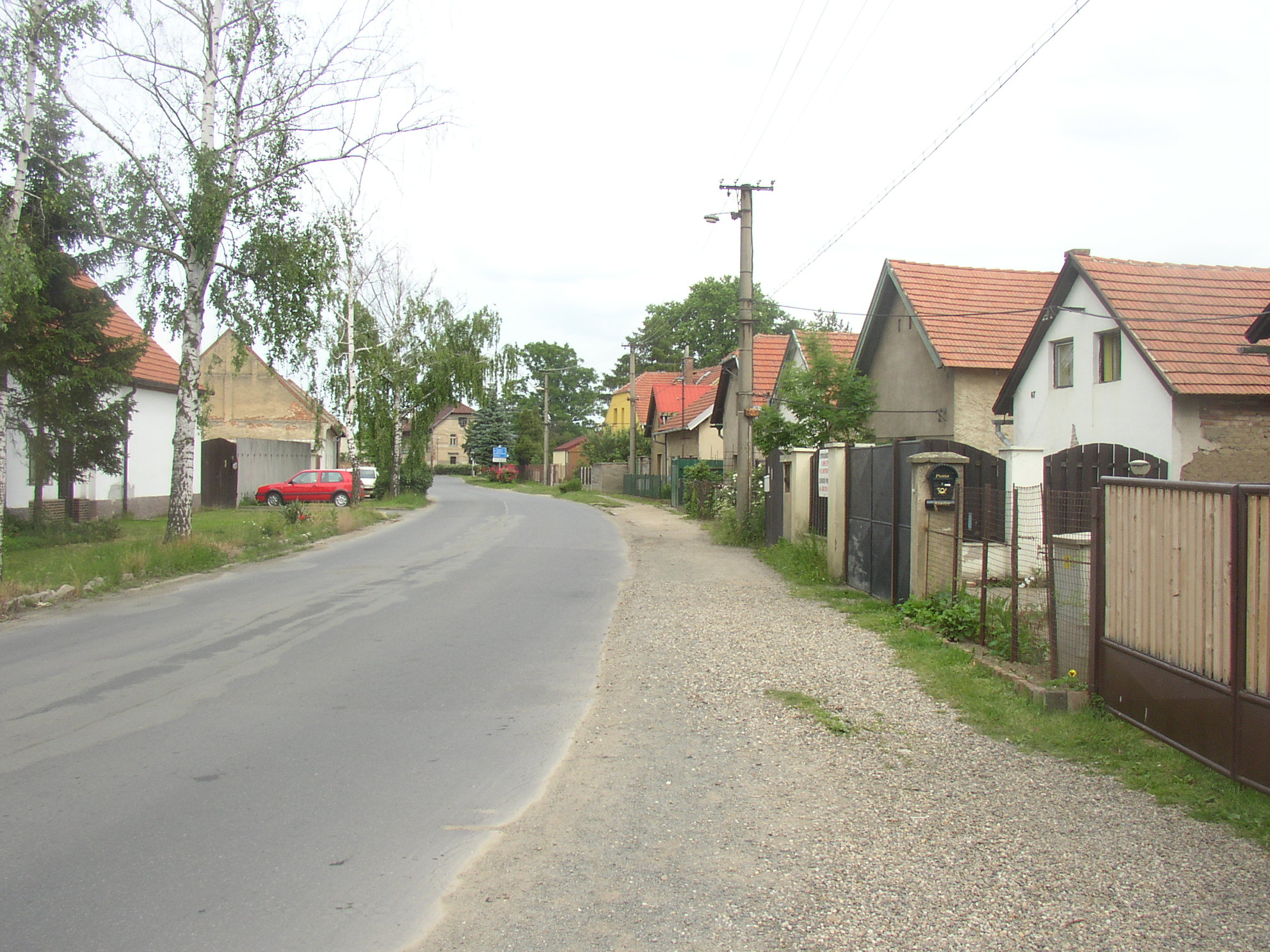
- Main road

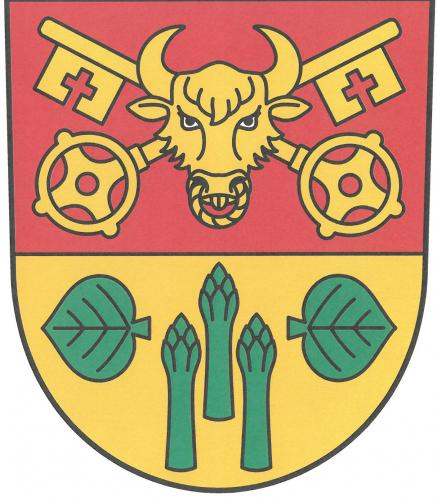
- Coat of arms

- Location in the Czech Republic
- Coordinates: 50°17′50″N 14°23′49″E
- Country: Czech Republic
- Region: Central Bohemian
- District: Mělník
- First mentioned: 1088

Area
  - Total: 4.78 km^{2} (1.85 sq mi)
- Elevation: 169 m (554 ft)

Population (2026-01-01)
  - Total: 328
  - Density: 68.6/km^{2} (178/sq mi)
- Time zone: UTC+1 (CET)
  - Summer (DST): UTC+2 (CEST)
- Postal code: 277 44
- Website: www.hostinuvojkovic.cz

Hostín u Vojkovic is a municipality and village in Mělník District in the Central Bohemian Region of the Czech Republic. It has about 300 inhabitants.

== Demographics ==
Historical population
Year	Pop.	±%
1869	401	—
1880	411	+2.5%
1890	457	+11.2%
1900	464	+1.5%
1910	441	−5.0%
1921	455	+3.2%
1930	431	−5.3%
1950	380	−11.8%
1961	339	−10.8%
1970	376	+10.9%
1980	356	−5.3%
1991	313	−12.1%
2001	326	+4.2%
2011	279	−14.4%
2021	305	+9.3%
Source: Censuses
