= Jinolice =

- Municipality
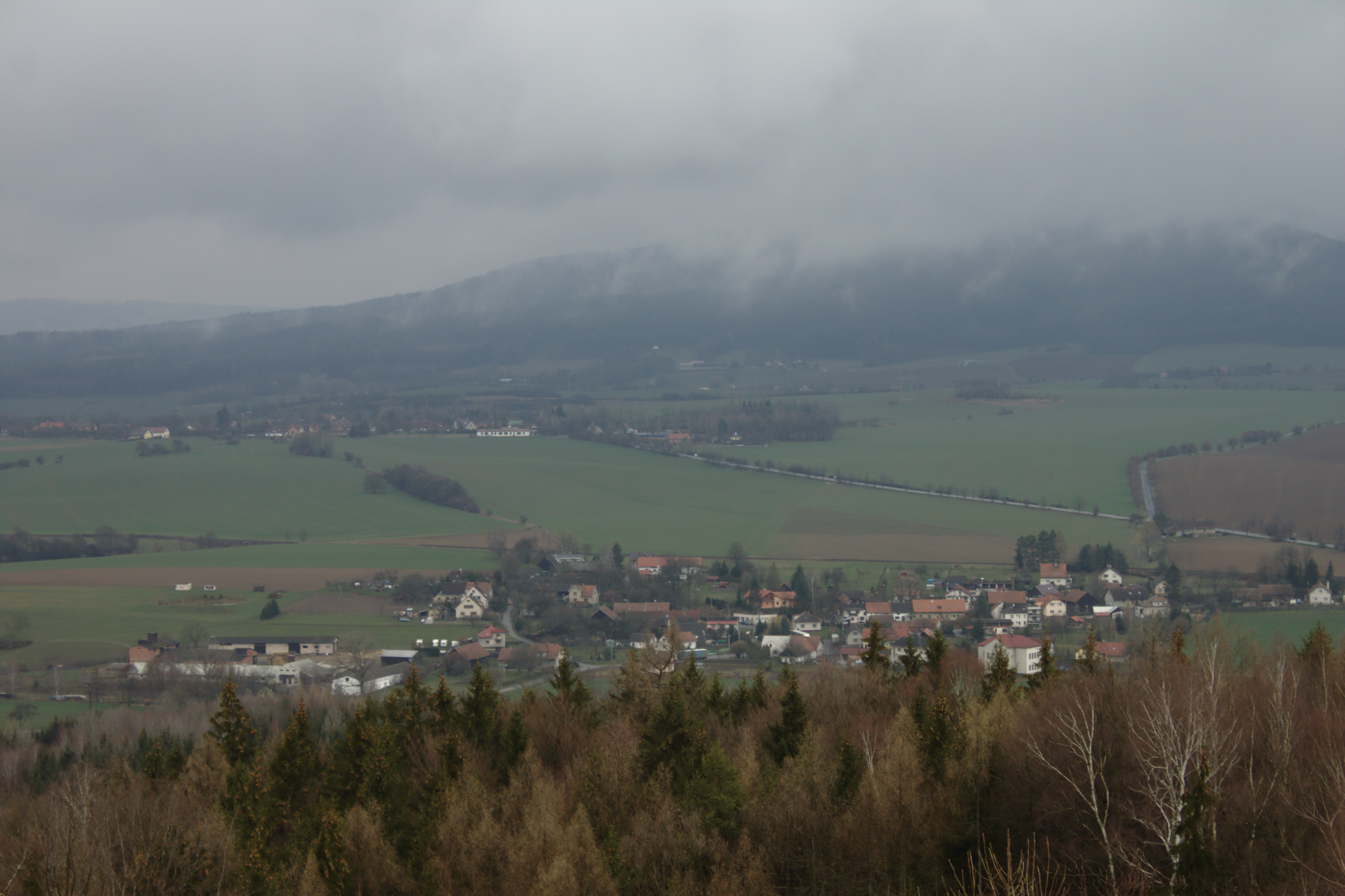
- View from the south

- Location in the Czech Republic
- Coordinates: 50°28′44″N 15°19′47″E
- Country: Czech Republic
- Region: Hradec Králové
- District: Jičín
- First mentioned: 1377

Area
  - Total: 2.15 km^{2} (0.83 sq mi)
- Elevation: 325 m (1,066 ft)

Population (2026-01-01)
  - Total: 186
  - Density: 86.5/km^{2} (224/sq mi)
- Time zone: UTC+1 (CET)
  - Summer (DST): UTC+2 (CEST)
- Postal code: 506 01
- Website: www.obecjinolice.cz

Jinolice is a municipality and village in Jičín District in the Hradec Králové Region of the Czech Republic. It has about 200 inhabitants.

== Demographics ==
Historical population
| Year | Pop. | ±% |
|---|---|---|
| 1869 | 293 | — |
| 1880 | 284 | −3.1% |
| 1890 | 284 | +0.0% |
| 1900 | 254 | −10.6% |
| 1910 | 223 | −12.2% |
| 1921 | 229 | +2.7% |
| 1930 | 235 | +2.6% |
| 1950 | 180 | −23.4% |
| 1961 | 179 | −0.6% |
| 1970 | 179 | +0.0% |
| 1980 | 165 | −7.8% |
| 1991 | 161 | −2.4% |
| 2001 | 170 | +5.6% |
| 2011 | 184 | +8.2% |
| 2021 | 190 | +3.3% |
Source: Censuses
