= Rokytňany =

- Municipality
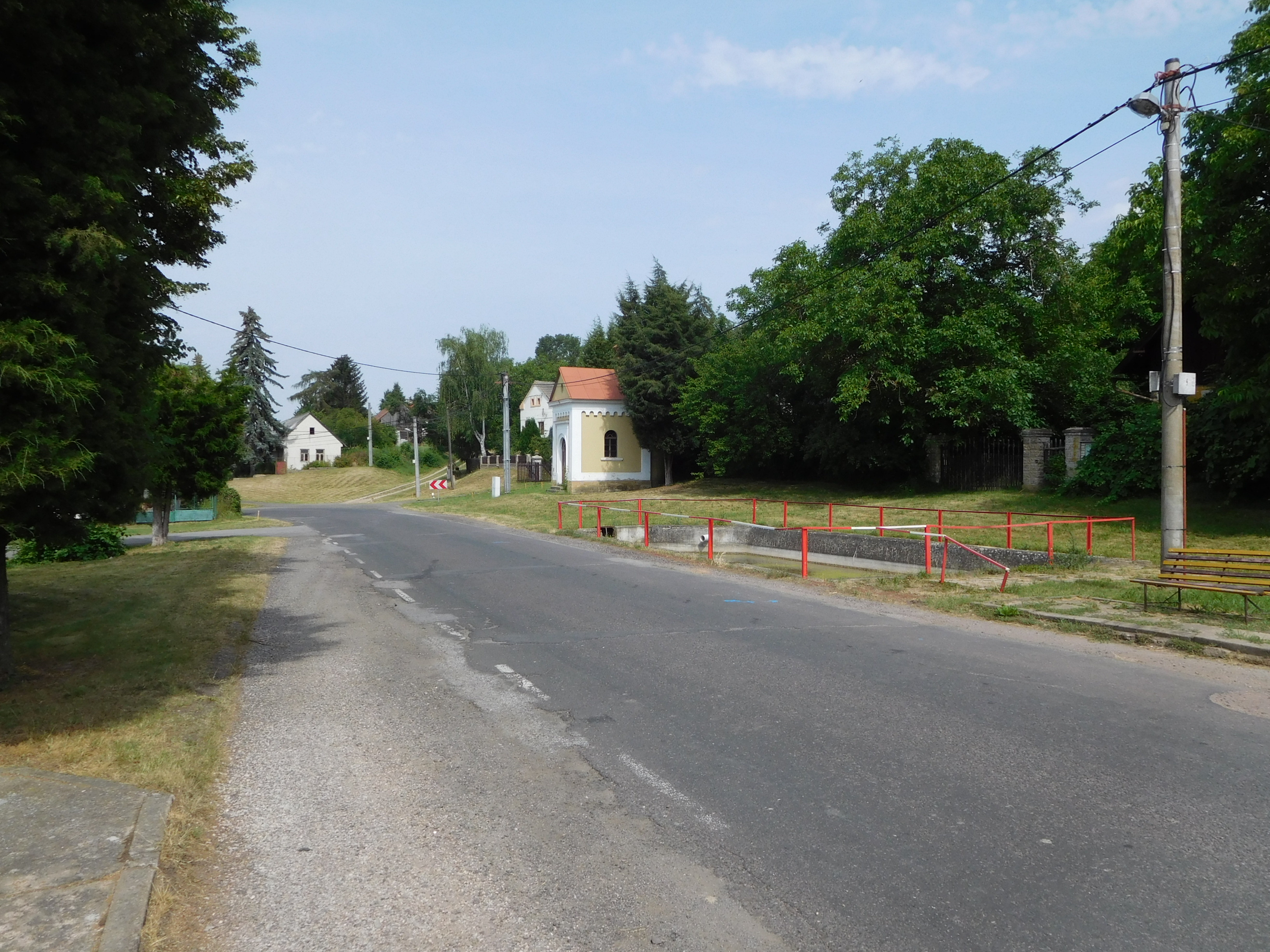
- Centre of Horní Rokytňany

- Location in the Czech Republic
- Coordinates: 50°22′39″N 15°7′42″E
- Country: Czech Republic
- Region: Hradec Králové
- District: Jičín
- First mentioned: 1381

Area
  - Total: 4.96 km^{2} (1.92 sq mi)
- Elevation: 248 m (814 ft)

Population (2026-01-01)
  - Total: 156
  - Density: 31.5/km^{2} (81.5/sq mi)
- Time zone: UTC+1 (CET)
  - Summer (DST): UTC+2 (CEST)
- Postal code: 507 23
- Website: www.rokytnany.e-obec.cz

Rokytňany is a municipality in Jičín District in the Hradec Králové Region of the Czech Republic. It has about 200 inhabitants.

== Administrative division ==
Rokytňany consists of two municipal parts (in brackets population according to the 2021 census):

- Dolní Rokytňany (73)
- Horní Rokytňany (50)

== Demographics ==
Historical population
Year	Pop.	±%
1869	474	—
1880	522	+10.1%
1890	538	+3.1%
1900	481	−10.6%
1910	470	−2.3%
1921	437	−7.0%
1930	382	−12.6%
1950	255	−33.2%
1961	209	−18.0%
1970	183	−12.4%
1980	114	−37.7%
1991	87	−23.7%
2001	75	−13.8%
2011	98	+30.7%
2021	123	+25.5%
Source: Censuses
