= Velký Beranov =

- Municipality
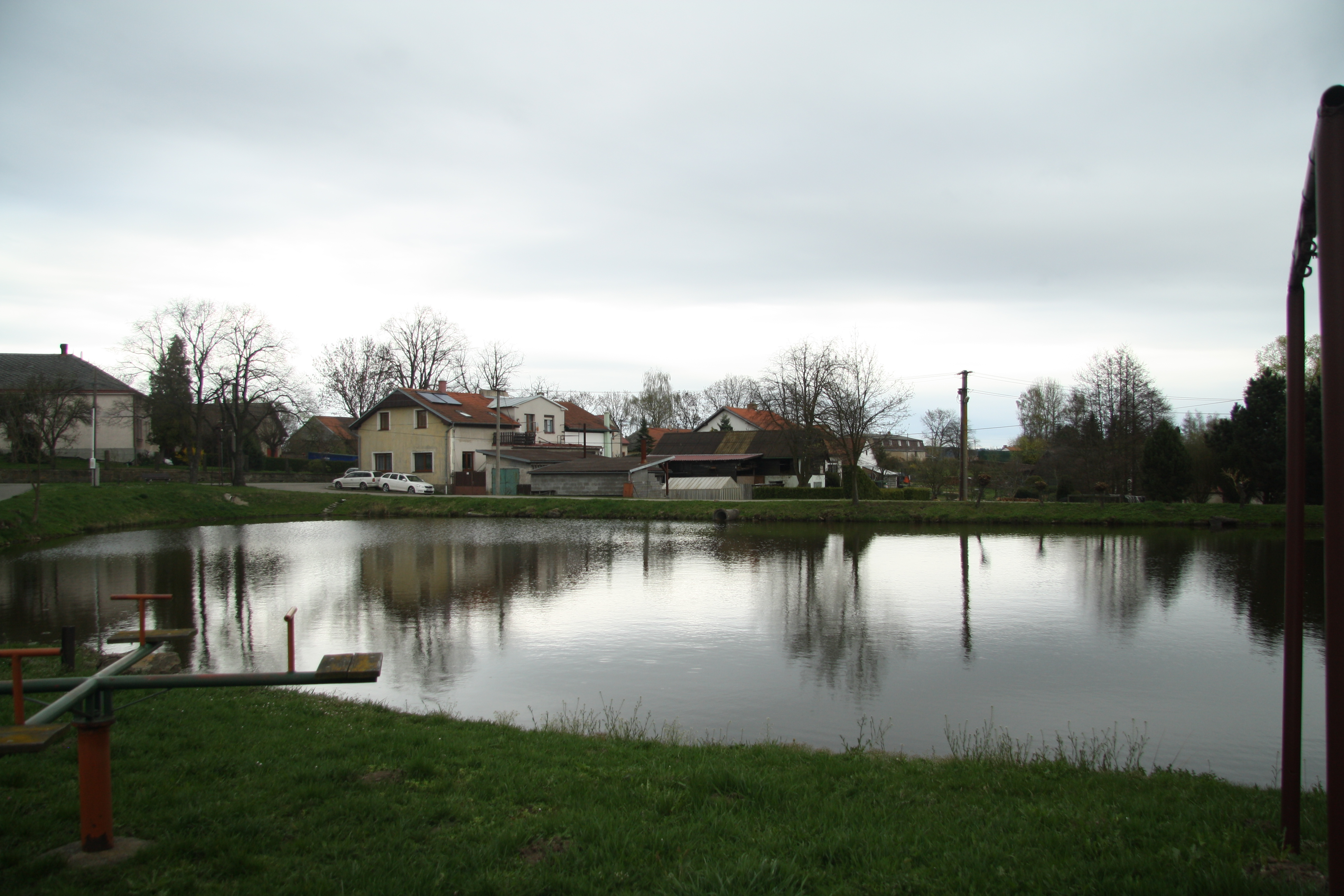
- Jeclov, a part of Velký Beranov

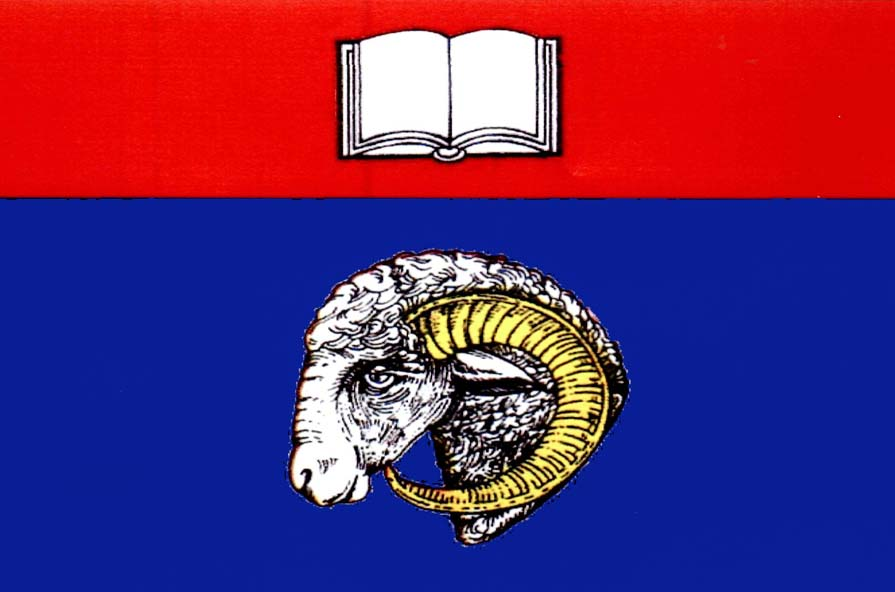
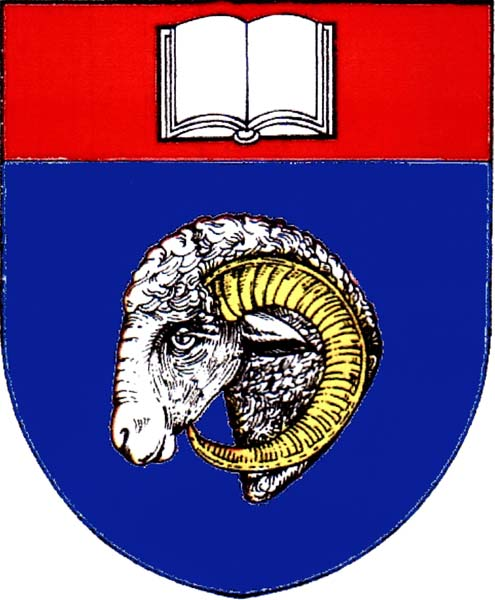
- Flag Coat of arms

- Location in the Czech Republic
- Coordinates: 49°24′18″N 15°40′1″E
- Country: Czech Republic
- Region: Vysočina
- District: Jihlava
- First mentioned: 1318

Area
  - Total: 10.15 km^{2} (3.92 sq mi)
- Elevation: 524 m (1,719 ft)

Population (2026-01-01)
  - Total: 1,316
  - Density: 129.7/km^{2} (335.8/sq mi)
- Time zone: UTC+1 (CET)
  - Summer (DST): UTC+2 (CEST)
- Postal code: 588 21
- Website: www.velkyberanov.cz

Velký Beranov (Czech pronunciation: [ˈvɛlkiː ˈbɛranof]) is a municipality and village in Jihlava District in the Vysočina Region of the Czech Republic. It has about 1,300 inhabitants.

== Administrative division ==
Velký Beranov consists of three municipal parts (in brackets population according to the 2021 census):

- Velký Beranov (1,134)
- Bradlo (49)
- Jeclov (61)

== Geography ==
Velký Beranov is located about 5 kilometres (3 mi) east of Jihlava. It lies in the southern part of the Upper Sázava Hills. The highest point is at 563 m (1,847 ft) above sea level. The Jihlava River forms the southern municipal border.

== History ==
The first written mention of Velký Beranov is from 1318.

== Demographics ==
Historical population

Year	Pop.	±%
1869	742	—
1880	803	+8.2%
1890	940	+17.1%
1900	949	+1.0%
1910	1,067	+12.4%

Year	Pop.	±%
1921	1,010	−5.3%
1930	1,034	+2.4%
1950	707	−31.6%
1961	820	+16.0%
1970	746	−9.0%

Year	Pop.	±%
1980	866	+16.1%
1991	1,077	+24.4%
2001	1,192	+10.7%
2011	1,270	+6.5%
2021	1,244	−2.0%

Source: Censuses

== Transport ==
There are no railways or major roads passing through the municipality, but the D1 motorway from Prague to Brno runs close to the northern municipal border.

== Sights ==
The main landmark of Velký Beranov is the Chapel of Saint Anne. It was built in the Neoclassical style in 1797.

A valuable technical monument is the stone bridge on the western edge of the municipal territory: It was built in 1783–1785 as part of the road from Brno to Jihlava. At the end of the 1930s, the road lost its importance and fell into disuse, but the bridge survived in its authentic form.
