= Nové Bránice =

- Municipality
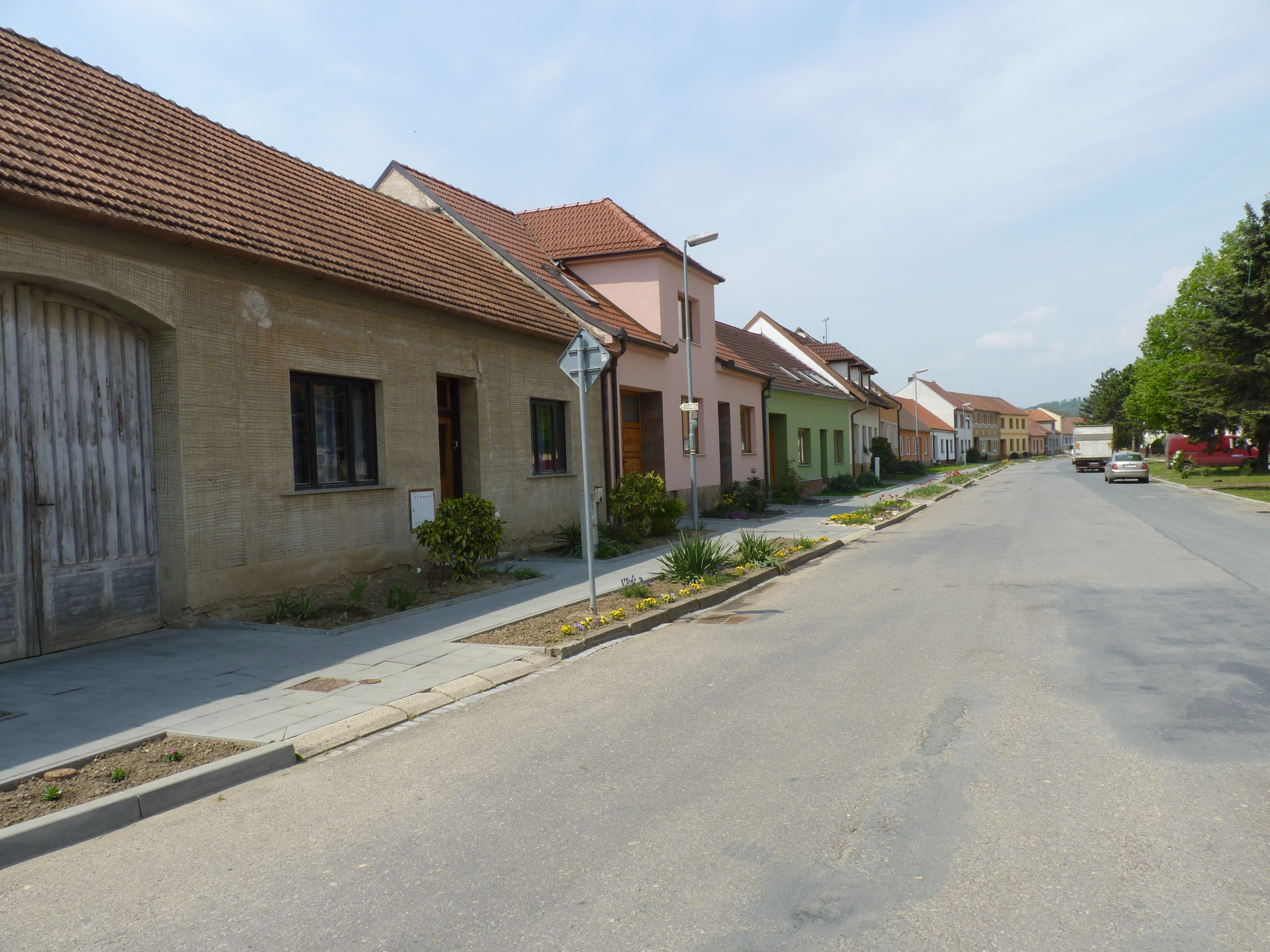
- Main road

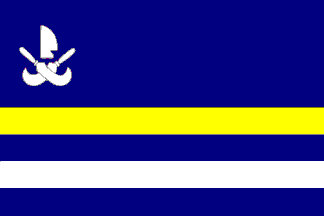
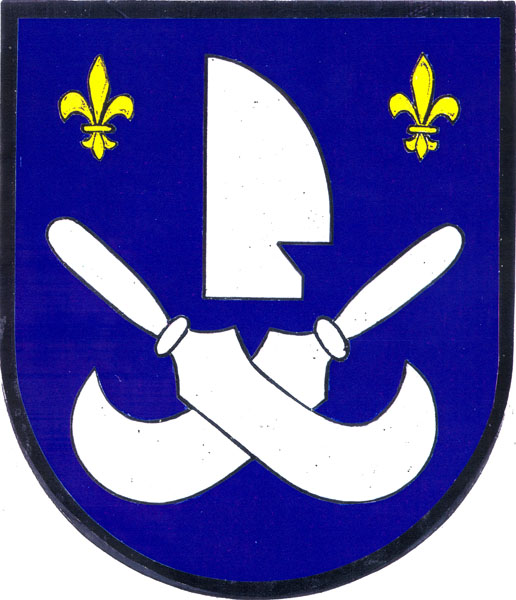
- Flag Coat of arms

- Location in the Czech Republic
- Coordinates: 49°4′16″N 16°26′30″E
- Country: Czech Republic
- Region: South Moravian
- District: Brno-Country
- First mentioned: 1306

Area
  - Total: 6.23 km^{2} (2.41 sq mi)
- Elevation: 198 m (650 ft)

Population (2026-01-01)
  - Total: 946
  - Density: 152/km^{2} (393/sq mi)
- Time zone: UTC+1 (CET)
  - Summer (DST): UTC+2 (CEST)
- Postal code: 664 64
- Website: www.novebranice.cz

Nové Bránice (until 1947 Německé Bránice; German: Deutsch Branitz) is a municipality and village in Brno-Country District in the South Moravian Region of the Czech Republic. It has about 900 inhabitants.

Nové Bránice lies on the Jihlava River, approximately 21 kilometres (13 mi) south-west of Brno and 184 km (114 mi) south-east of Prague.

== Demographics ==
Historical population
Year	Pop.	±%
1869	496	—
1880	498	+0.4%
1890	520	+4.4%
1900	552	+6.2%
1910	576	+4.3%
1921	569	−1.2%
1930	594	+4.4%
1950	591	−0.5%
1961	591	+0.0%
1970	602	+1.9%
1980	630	+4.7%
1991	645	+2.4%
2001	660	+2.3%
2011	696	+5.5%
2021	700	+0.6%
Source: Censuses
