= Kupařovice =

- Municipality
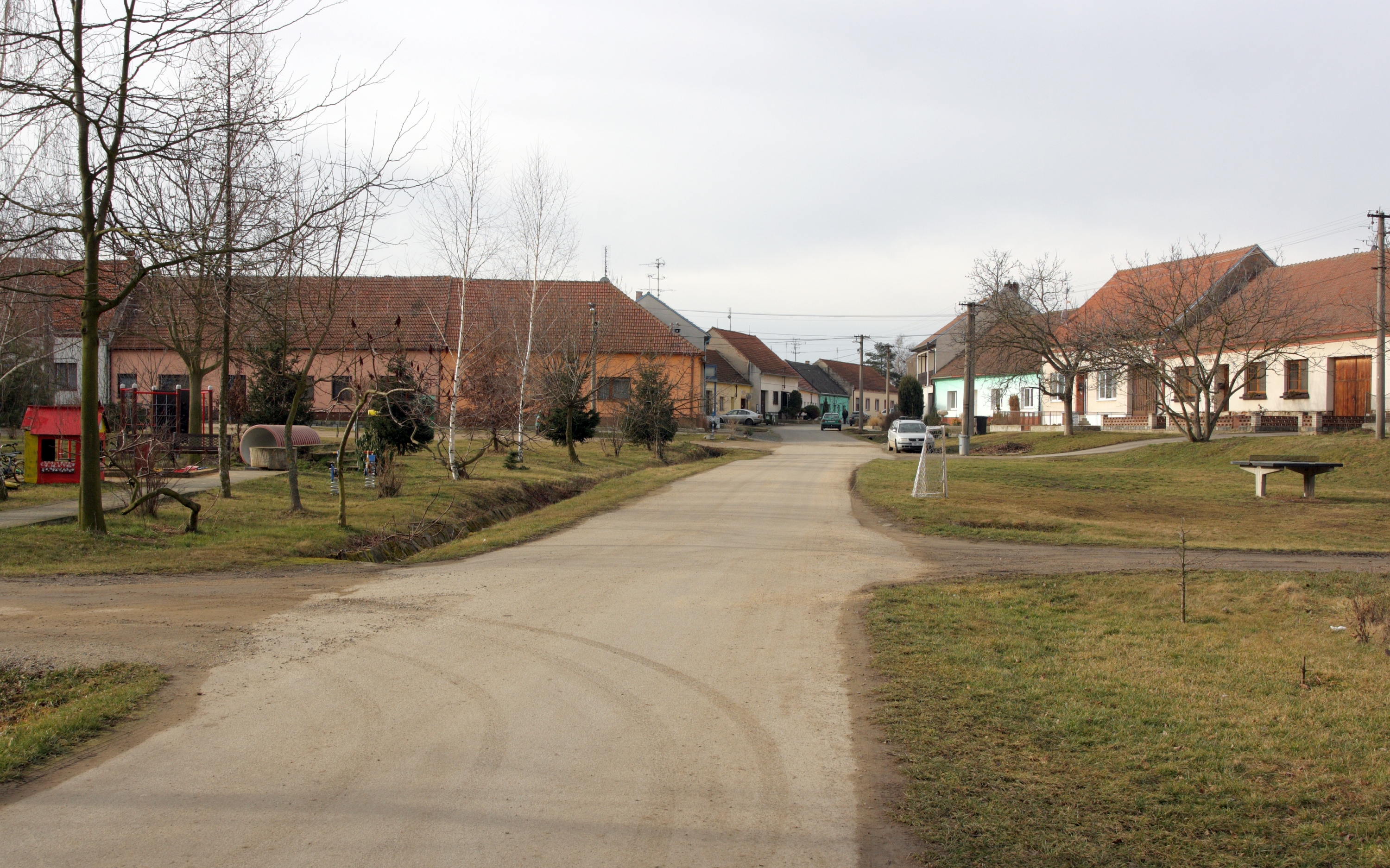
- Centre of Kupařovice

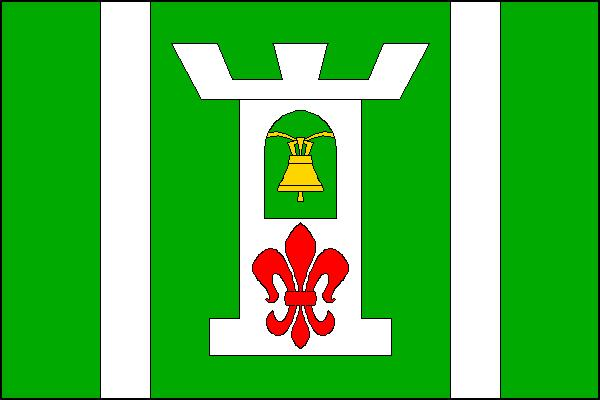
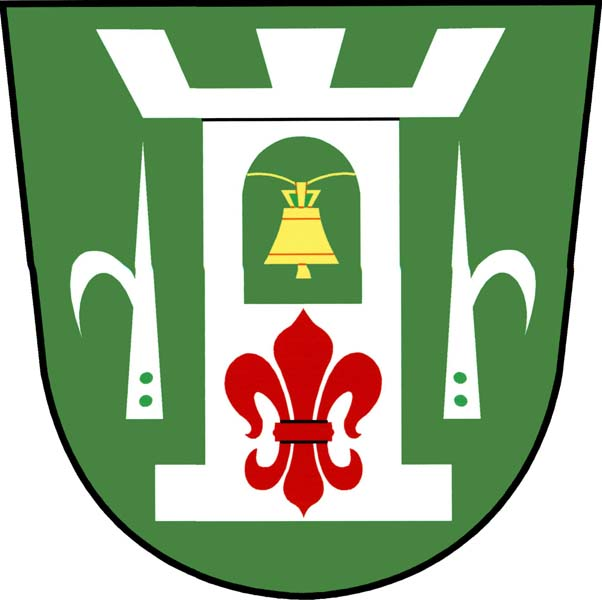
- Flag Coat of arms

- Location in the Czech Republic
- Coordinates: 49°2′36″N 16°29′27″E
- Country: Czech Republic
- Region: South Moravian
- District: Brno-Country
- First mentioned: 1337

Area
  - Total: 3.31 km^{2} (1.28 sq mi)
- Elevation: 187 m (614 ft)

Population (2026-01-01)
  - Total: 393
  - Density: 119/km^{2} (308/sq mi)
- Time zone: UTC+1 (CET)
  - Summer (DST): UTC+2 (CEST)
- Postal code: 664 64
- Website: www.kuparovice.cz

Kupařovice (German: Kuprowitz) is a municipality and village in Brno-Country District in the South Moravian Region of the Czech Republic. It has about 400 inhabitants.

Kupařovice lies on the Jihlava River, approximately 22 kilometres (14 mi) south-west of Brno and 189 km (117 mi) south-east of Prague.

== Demographics ==
Historical population
Year	Pop.	±%
1869	219	—
1880	252	+15.1%
1890	255	+1.2%
1900	259	+1.6%
1910	285	+10.0%
1921	275	−3.5%
1930	251	−8.7%
1950	178	−29.1%
1961	199	+11.8%
1970	223	+12.1%
1980	217	−2.7%
1991	263	+21.2%
2001	282	+7.2%
2011	270	−4.3%
2021	353	+30.7%
Source: Censuses
