= Bransouze =

- Municipality
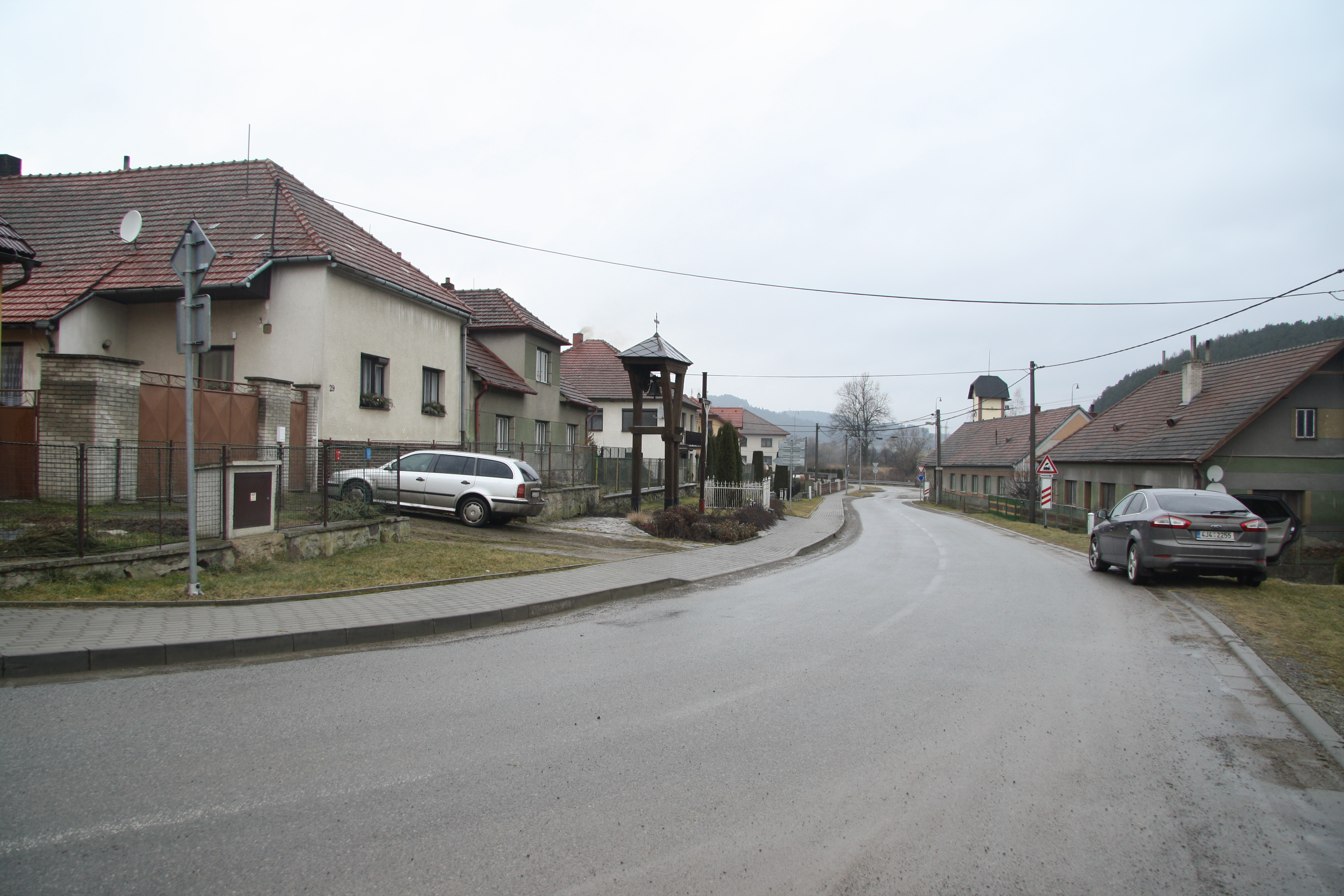
- Centre of Bransouze

- Flag Coat of arms

- Location in the Czech Republic
- Coordinates: 49°18′9″N 15°45′7″E
- Country: Czech Republic
- Region: Vysočina
- District: Třebíč
- First mentioned: 1234

Area
  - Total: 5.15 km^{2} (1.99 sq mi)
- Elevation: 427 m (1,401 ft)

Population (2026-01-01)
  - Total: 210
  - Density: 41/km^{2} (110/sq mi)
- Time zone: UTC+1 (CET)
  - Summer (DST): UTC+2 (CEST)
- Postal code: 675 21
- Website: www.bransouze.cz

Bransouze is a municipality and village in Třebíč District in the Vysočina Region of the Czech Republic. It has about 200 inhabitants.

== Etymology ==
The initial name of the settlement was Branečeves, meaning "Branek's village". The name Bransouze has been used since 1915.

== Geography ==
Bransouze is located about 13 kilometres (8 mi) northwest of Třebíč and 16 km (10 mi) southeast of Jihlava. It lies in the Křižanov Highlands. The highest point is the Bukovec hill at 572 m (1,877 ft) above sea level. The municipality is situated on the right bank of the Jihlava River.

== History ==
The first written mention of Bransouze is from 1234.

== Demographics ==
Historical population

Year	Pop.	±%
1869	367	—
1880	343	−6.5%
1890	329	−4.1%
1900	344	+4.6%
1910	365	+6.1%

Year	Pop.	±%
1921	381	+4.4%
1930	368	−3.4%
1950	350	−4.9%
1961	348	−0.6%
1970	335	−3.7%

Year	Pop.	±%
1980	326	−2.7%
1991	296	−9.2%
2001	258	−12.8%
2011	249	−3.5%
2021	222	−10.8%

Source: Censuses

== Transport ==
Bransouze is located on the railway line Jihlava–Třebíč.

== Sights ==
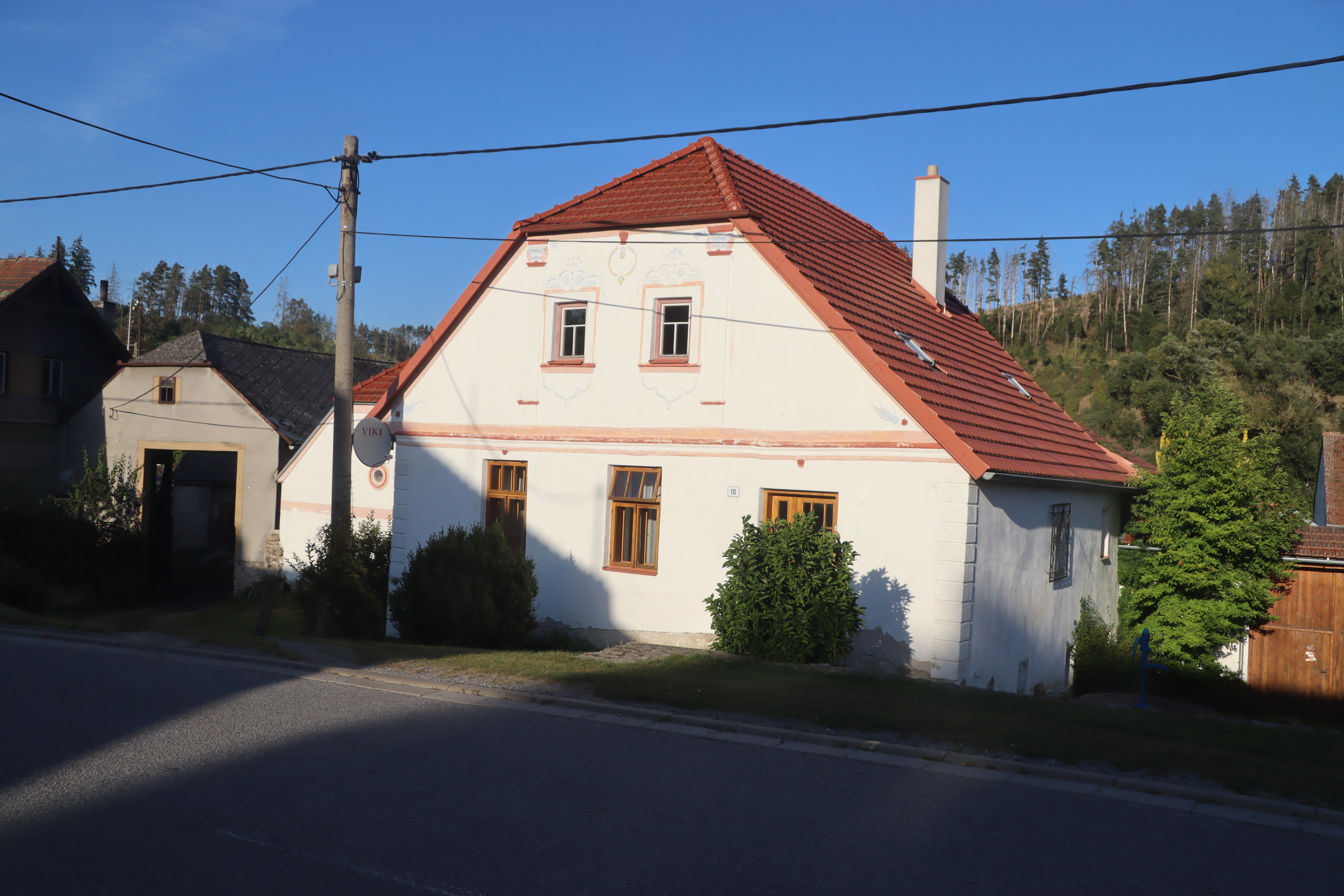
Protected house No. 10

Bransouze is poor in monuments. The only protected cultural monument is a rural house from the mid-19th century. It is a unique example of folk architecture of the region.
