= Horní Ves =

- Municipality
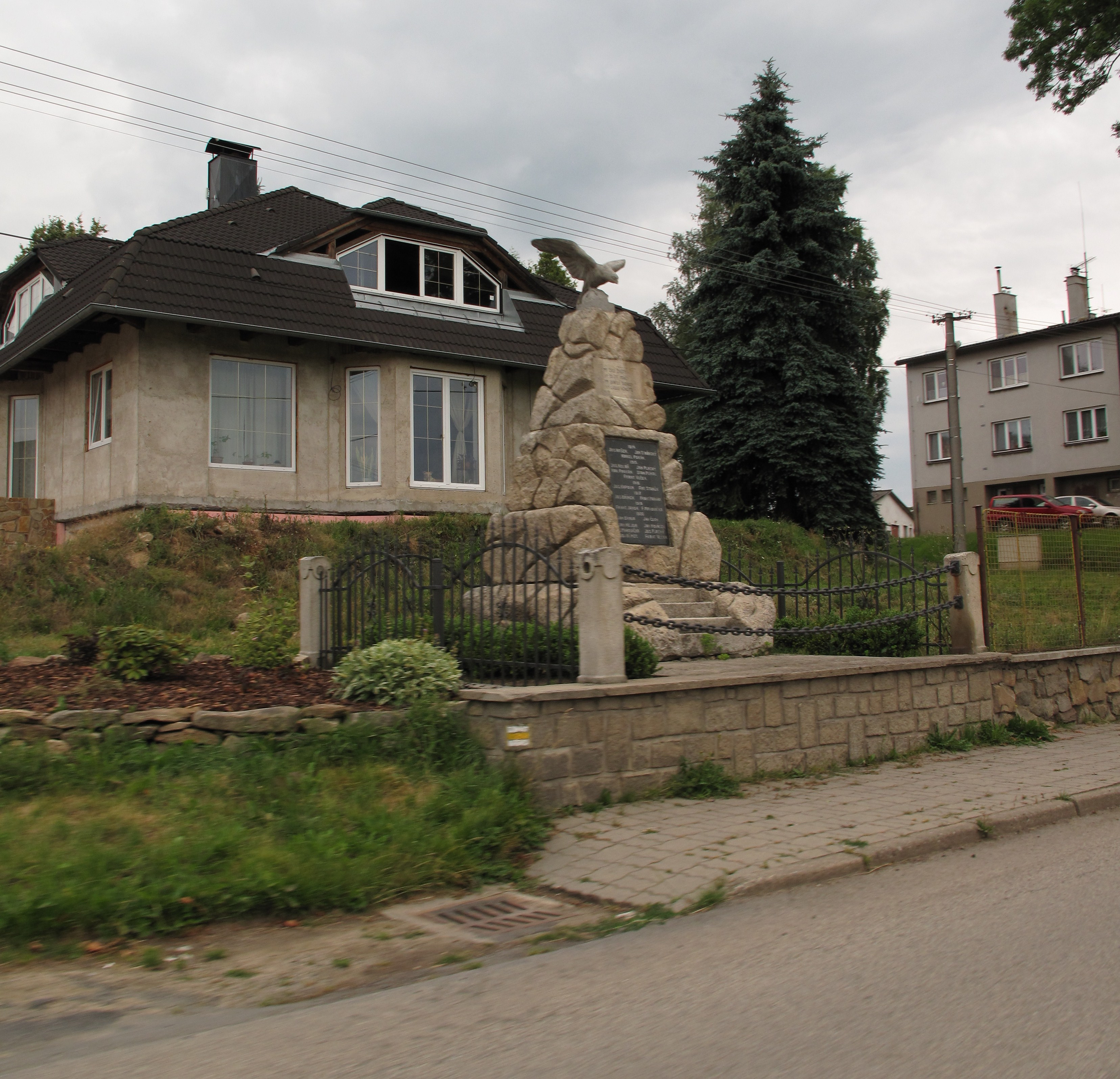
- Memorial to the fallen of World War I

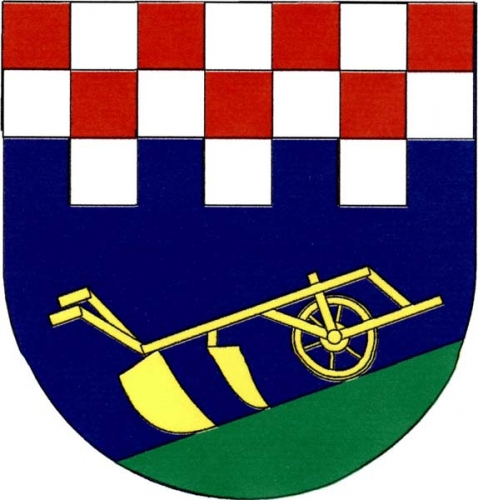
- Flag Coat of arms

- Location in the Czech Republic
- Coordinates: 49°17′36″N 15°18′27″E
- Country: Czech Republic
- Region: Vysočina
- District: Pelhřimov
- First mentioned: 1364

Area
  - Total: 9.24 km^{2} (3.57 sq mi)
- Elevation: 598 m (1,962 ft)

Population (2026-01-01)
  - Total: 337
  - Density: 36.5/km^{2} (94.5/sq mi)
- Time zone: UTC+1 (CET)
  - Summer (DST): UTC+2 (CEST)
- Postal code: 394 03
- Website: www.hornives.cz

Horní Ves (German: Oberdorf) is a municipality and village in Pelhřimov District in the Vysočina Region of the Czech Republic. It has about 300 inhabitants.

Horní Ves lies on the Jihlava River, approximately 18 kilometres (11 mi) south-east of Pelhřimov, 24 km (15 mi) south-west of Jihlava, and 110 km (68 mi) south-east of Prague.

== Demographics ==
Historical population
Year	Pop.	±%
1869	633	—
1880	615	−2.8%
1890	686	+11.5%
1900	653	−4.8%
1910	683	+4.6%
1921	752	+10.1%
1930	645	−14.2%
1950	485	−24.8%
1961	510	+5.2%
1970	455	−10.8%
1980	395	−13.2%
1991	382	−3.3%
2001	359	−6.0%
2011	288	−19.8%
2021	309	+7.3%
Source: Censuses
