= Dvorce (Jihlava District) =

- Municipality
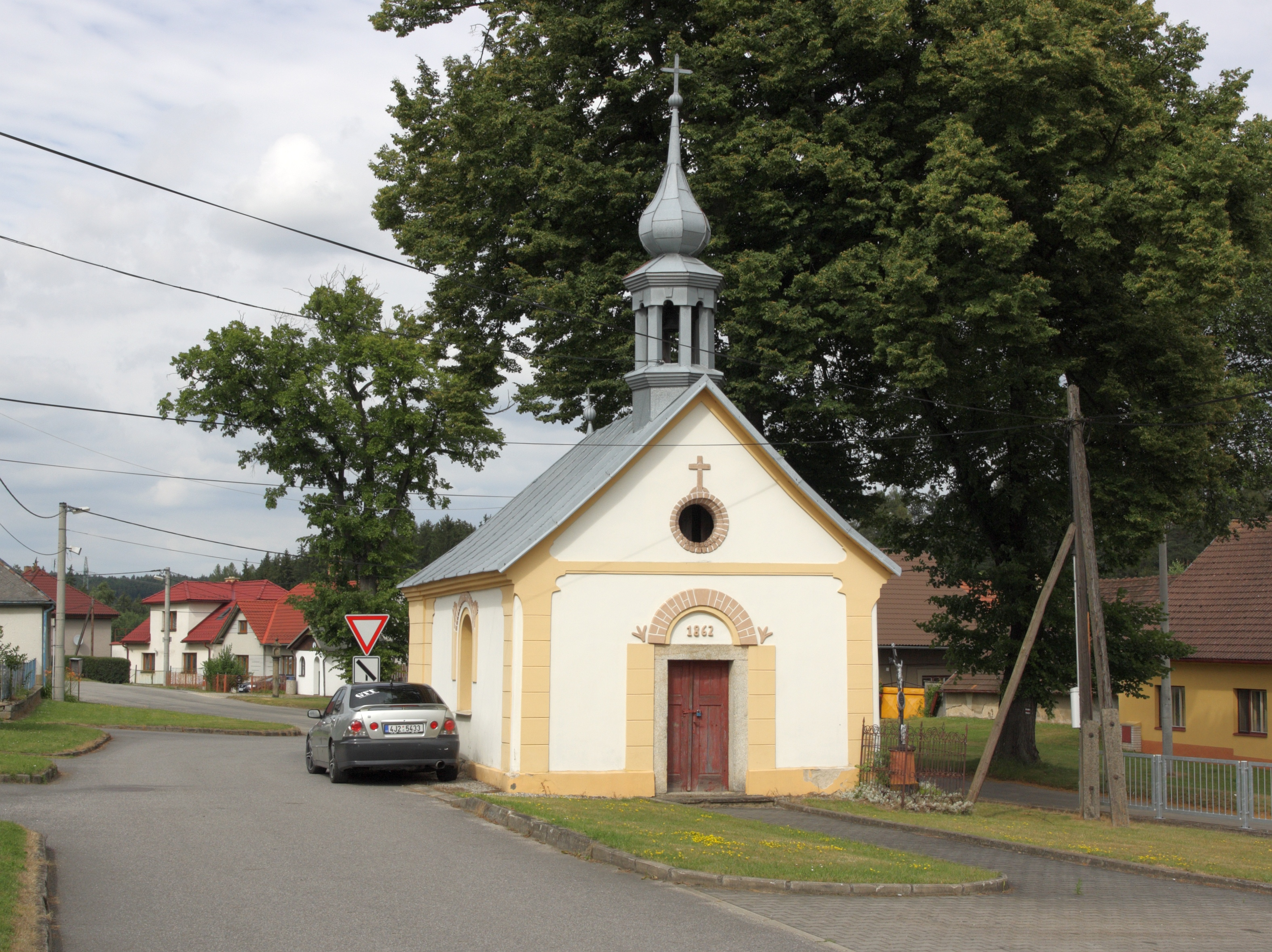
- Chapel of Saint John of Nepomuk

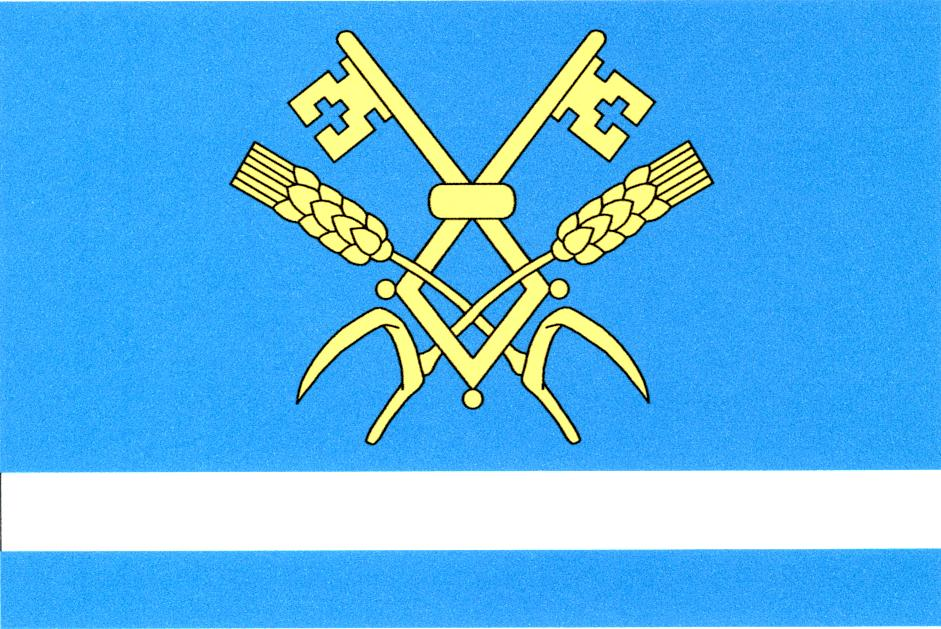
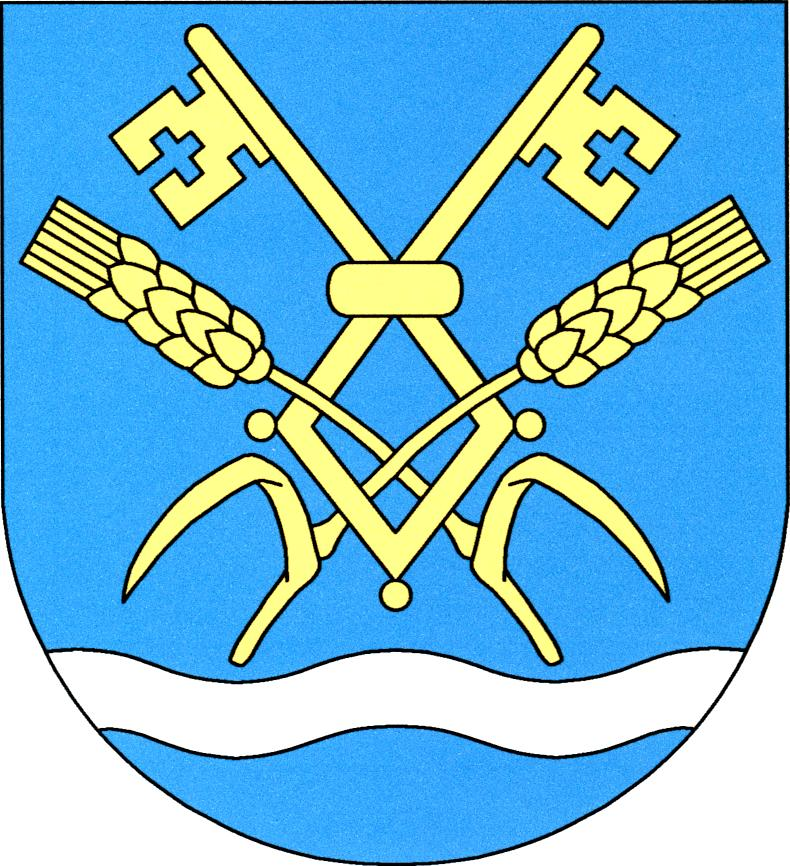
- Flag Coat of arms

- Location in the Czech Republic
- Coordinates: 49°22′31″N 15°29′25″E
- Country: Czech Republic
- Region: Vysočina
- District: Jihlava
- First mentioned: 1360

Area
  - Total: 3.50 km^{2} (1.35 sq mi)
- Elevation: 515 m (1,690 ft)

Population (2026-01-01)
  - Total: 203
  - Density: 58.0/km^{2} (150/sq mi)
- Time zone: UTC+1 (CET)
  - Summer (DST): UTC+2 (CEST)
- Postal code: 588 51
- Website: www.obec-dvorce.cz

Dvorce (Czech pronunciation: [ˈdvortsɛ]; German: Höfen) is a municipality and village in Jihlava District in the Vysočina Region of the Czech Republic. It has about 200 inhabitants.

Dvorce lies on the Jihlava River, approximately 8 kilometres (5 mi) west of Jihlava and 110 km (68 mi) south-east of Prague.

== Demographics ==
Historical population
Year	Pop.	±%
1869	187	—
1880	185	−1.1%
1890	195	+5.4%
1900	197	+1.0%
1910	204	+3.6%
1921	200	−2.0%
1930	275	+37.5%
1950	202	−26.5%
1961	239	+18.3%
1970	227	−5.0%
1980	210	−7.5%
1991	173	−17.6%
2001	159	−8.1%
2011	184	+15.7%
2021	215	+16.8%
Source: Censuses
