= Bítovčice =

- Municipality
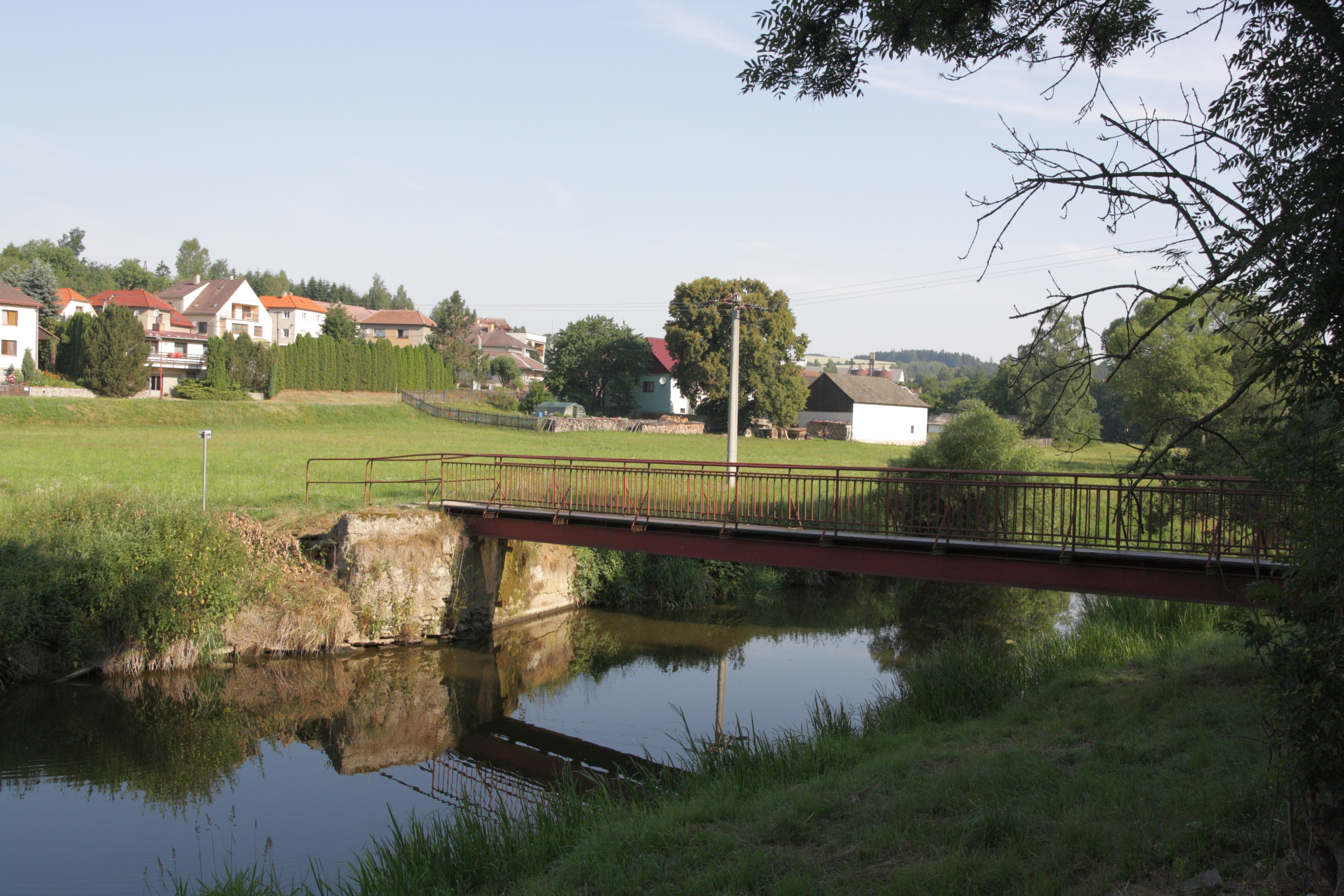
- Bridge over the Jihlava River

- Flag Coat of arms

- Location in the Czech Republic
- Coordinates: 49°22′5″N 15°44′3″E
- Country: Czech Republic
- Region: Vysočina
- District: Jihlava
- First mentioned: 1360

Area
  - Total: 6.61 km^{2} (2.55 sq mi)
- Elevation: 458 m (1,503 ft)

Population (2026-01-01)
  - Total: 395
  - Density: 59.8/km^{2} (155/sq mi)
- Time zone: UTC+1 (CET)
  - Summer (DST): UTC+2 (CEST)
- Postal code: 588 22
- Website: www.bitovcice.cz

Bítovčice (Czech pronunciation: [ˈbiːtoftʃɪtsɛ]) is a municipality and village in Jihlava District in the Vysočina Region of the Czech Republic. It has about 400 inhabitants.

Bítovčice lies on the Jihlava River, approximately 12 kilometres (7.5 mi) east of Jihlava and 124 km (77 mi) south-east of Prague.

== Demographics ==
Historical population
Year	Pop.	±%
1869	485	—
1880	439	−9.5%
1890	459	+4.6%
1900	465	+1.3%
1910	536	+15.3%
1921	551	+2.8%
1930	544	−1.3%
1950	511	−6.1%
1961	500	−2.2%
1970	476	−4.8%
1980	430	−9.7%
1991	407	−5.3%
2001	399	−2.0%
2011	432	+8.3%
2021	403	−6.7%
Source: Censuses
