= Rantířov =

- Municipality
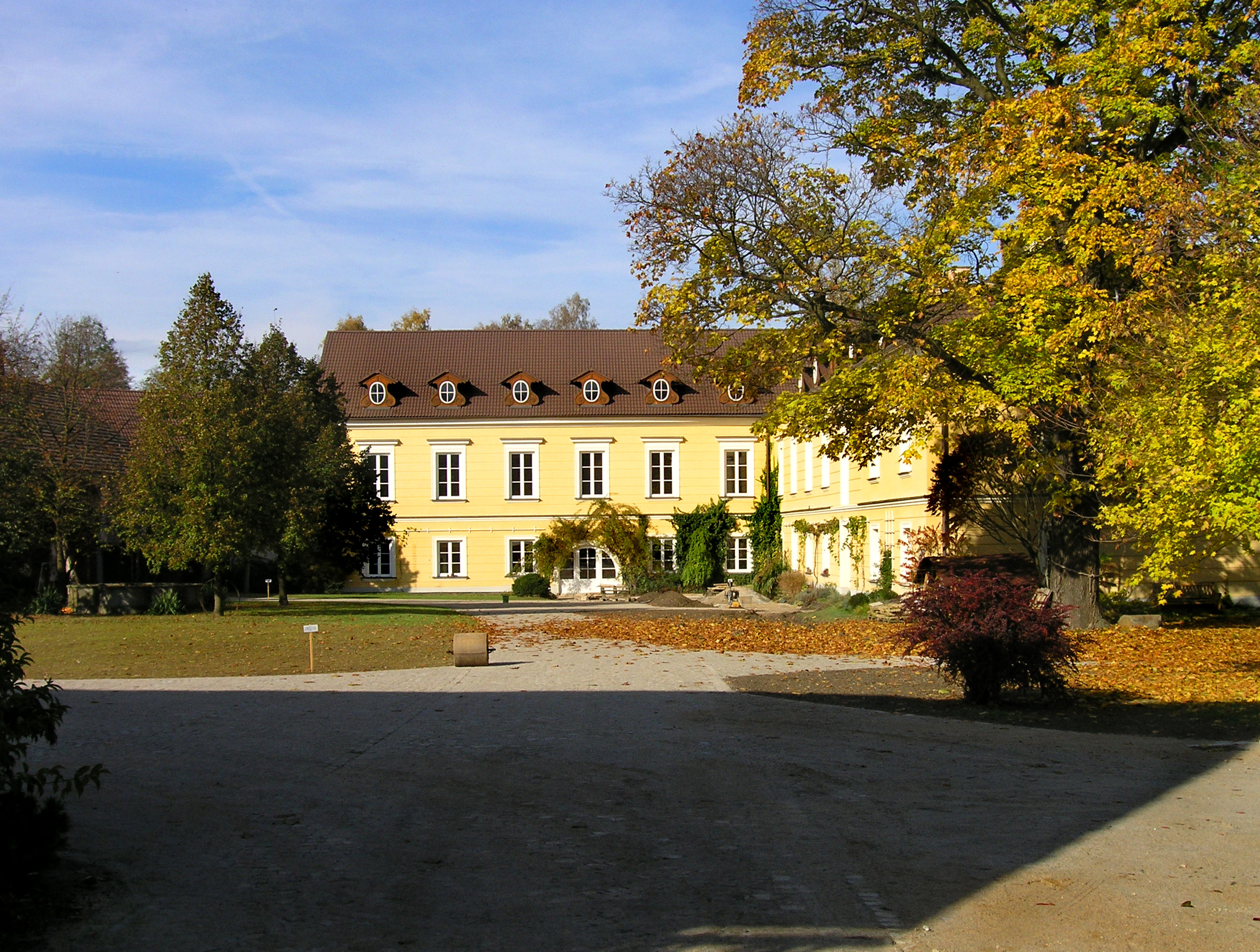
- Rantířov Castle

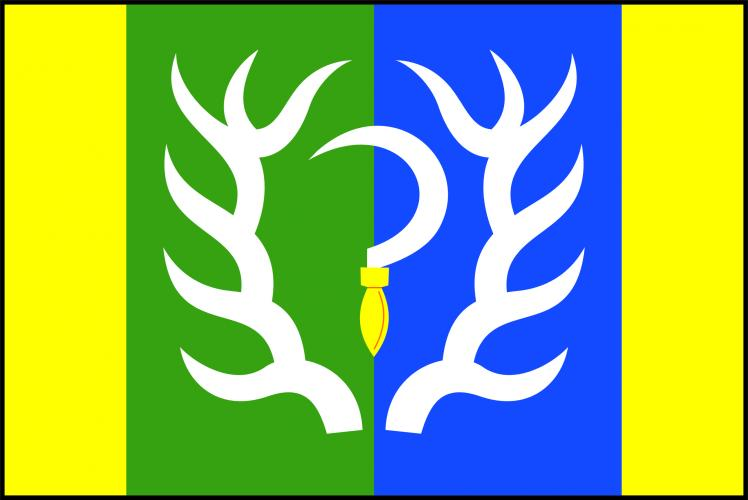
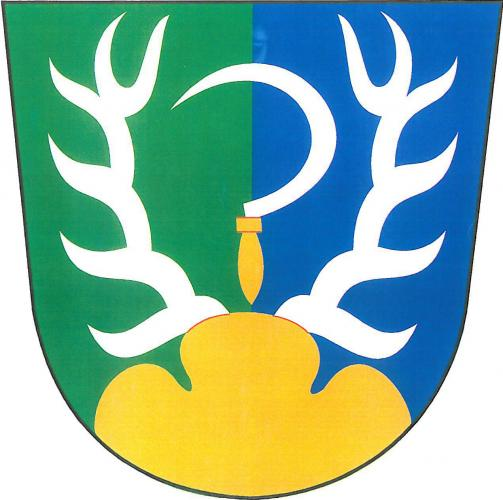
- Flag Coat of arms

- Location in the Czech Republic
- Coordinates: 49°24′30″N 15°30′55″E
- Country: Czech Republic
- Region: Vysočina
- District: Jihlava
- First mentioned: 1359

Area
  - Total: 2.74 km^{2} (1.06 sq mi)
- Elevation: 494 m (1,621 ft)

Population (2026-01-01)
  - Total: 468
  - Density: 171/km^{2} (442/sq mi)
- Time zone: UTC+1 (CET)
  - Summer (DST): UTC+2 (CEST)
- Postal code: 588 41
- Website: www.obecrantirov.cz

Rantířov (Czech pronunciation: [ˈraɲciːr̝of]; German: Fussdorf) is a municipality and village in Jihlava District in the Vysočina Region of the Czech Republic. It has about 500 inhabitants.

Rantířov lies on the Jihlava River, approximately 6 kilometres (4 mi) west of Jihlava and 110 km (68 mi) south-east of Prague.

== Demographics ==
Historical population
Year	Pop.	±%
1869	383	—
1880	323	−15.7%
1890	334	+3.4%
1900	361	+8.1%
1910	389	+7.8%
1921	374	−3.9%
1930	411	+9.9%
1950	324	−21.2%
1961	328	+1.2%
1970	312	−4.9%
1980	313	+0.3%
1991	331	+5.8%
2001	355	+7.3%
2011	463	+30.4%
2021	456	−1.5%
Source: Censuses
