= Vladislav (Třebíč District) =

- Market town
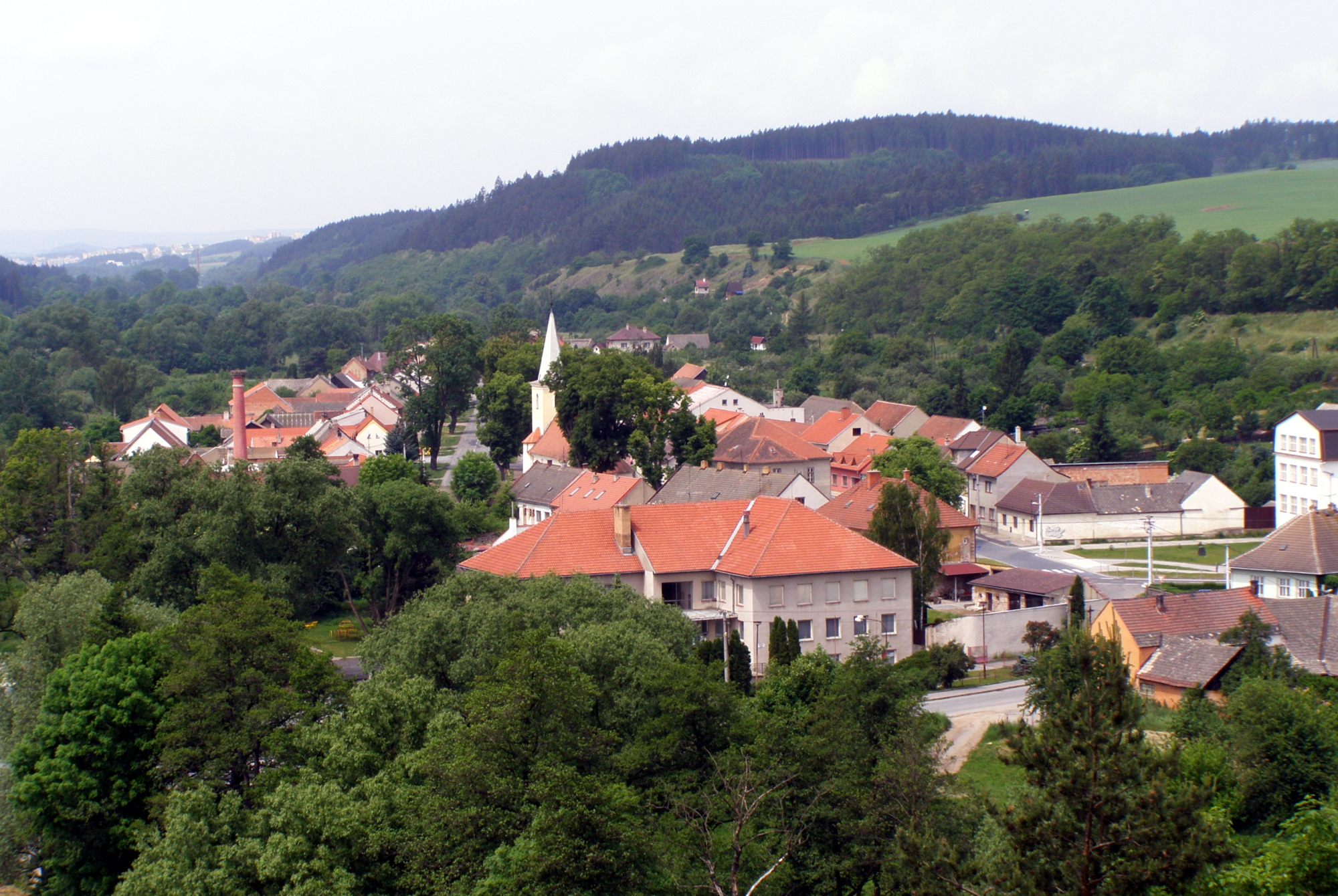
- Centre of Vladislav

- Flag Coat of arms

- Location in the Czech Republic
- Coordinates: 49°12′37″N 15°59′18″E
- Country: Czech Republic
- Region: Vysočina
- District: Třebíč
- First mentioned: 1104

Area
  - Total: 18.50 km^{2} (7.14 sq mi)
- Elevation: 385 m (1,263 ft)

Population (2026-01-01)
  - Total: 1,151
  - Density: 62.22/km^{2} (161.1/sq mi)
- Time zone: UTC+1 (CET)
  - Summer (DST): UTC+2 (CEST)
- Postal code: 675 01
- Website: www.mestysvladislav.cz

Vladislav (Czech pronunciation: [ˈvlaɟɪslaf]) is a market town in Třebíč District in the Vysočina Region of the Czech Republic. It has about 1,200 inhabitants.

== Administrative division ==
Vladislav consists of three municipal parts (in brackets population according to the 2021 census):

- Vladislav (891)
- Hostákov (187)
- Střížov (66)

== Geography ==
Vladislav is located about 7 kilometres (4 mi) east of Třebíč and 44 km (27 mi) west of Brno. It lies on the border between the Jevišovice Uplands and Křižanov Highlands. The highest point is at 495 m (1,624 ft) above sea level. The market town is situated on the left bank of the Jihlava River.

== History ==
The first written mention of Vladislav is in the foundation deed of the Třebíč Monastery from 1104, when it was called Brod. In 1304, the settlement was burned down by the Cumans. The settlements was renewed and in 1548, it was promoted to a market town. The name Vladislav first appeared in 1665.

== Demographics ==
Historical population

Year	Pop.	±%
1869	951	—
1880	974	+2.4%
1890	998	+2.5%
1900	1,065	+6.7%
1910	1,211	+13.7%

Year	Pop.	±%
1921	1,249	+3.1%
1930	1,367	+9.4%
1950	1,358	−0.7%
1961	1,458	+7.4%
1970	1,385	−5.0%

Year	Pop.	±%
1980	1,310	−5.4%
1991	1,227	−6.3%
2001	1,222	−0.4%
2011	1,142	−6.5%
2021	1,144	+0.2%

Source: Censuses

== Transport ==
The I/23 road (the section from Třebíč to Rosice) runs through Vladislav.

Vladislav is located on the railway line Brno–Třebíč.

== Sights ==
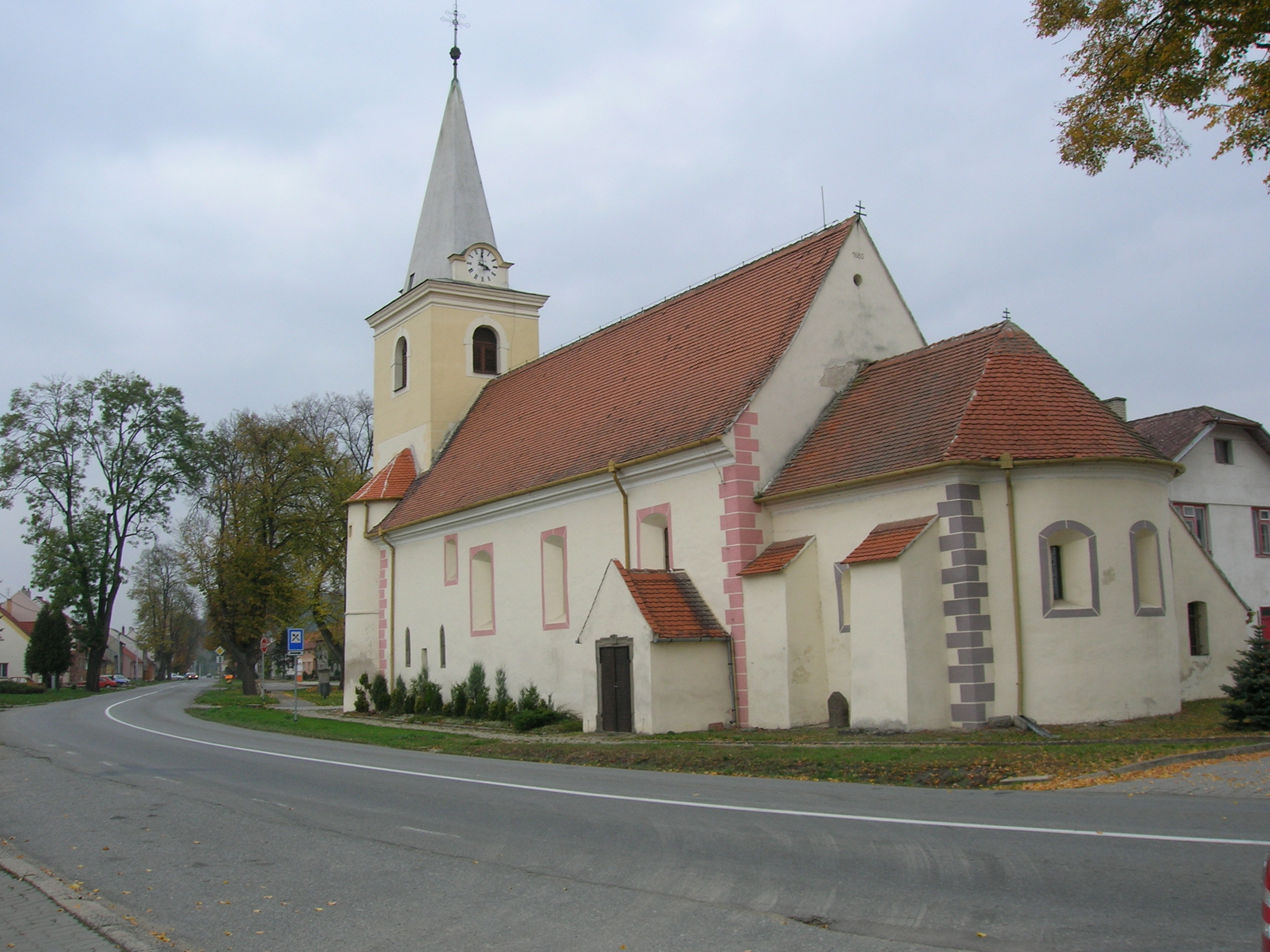
Church of the Holy Trinity

The main landmark is the Church of the Holy Trinity. It has a Romanesque apse and a late Gothic tower. After the Thirty Years' War, it was reconstructed in the Baroque style.
