= Jihlava (river) =

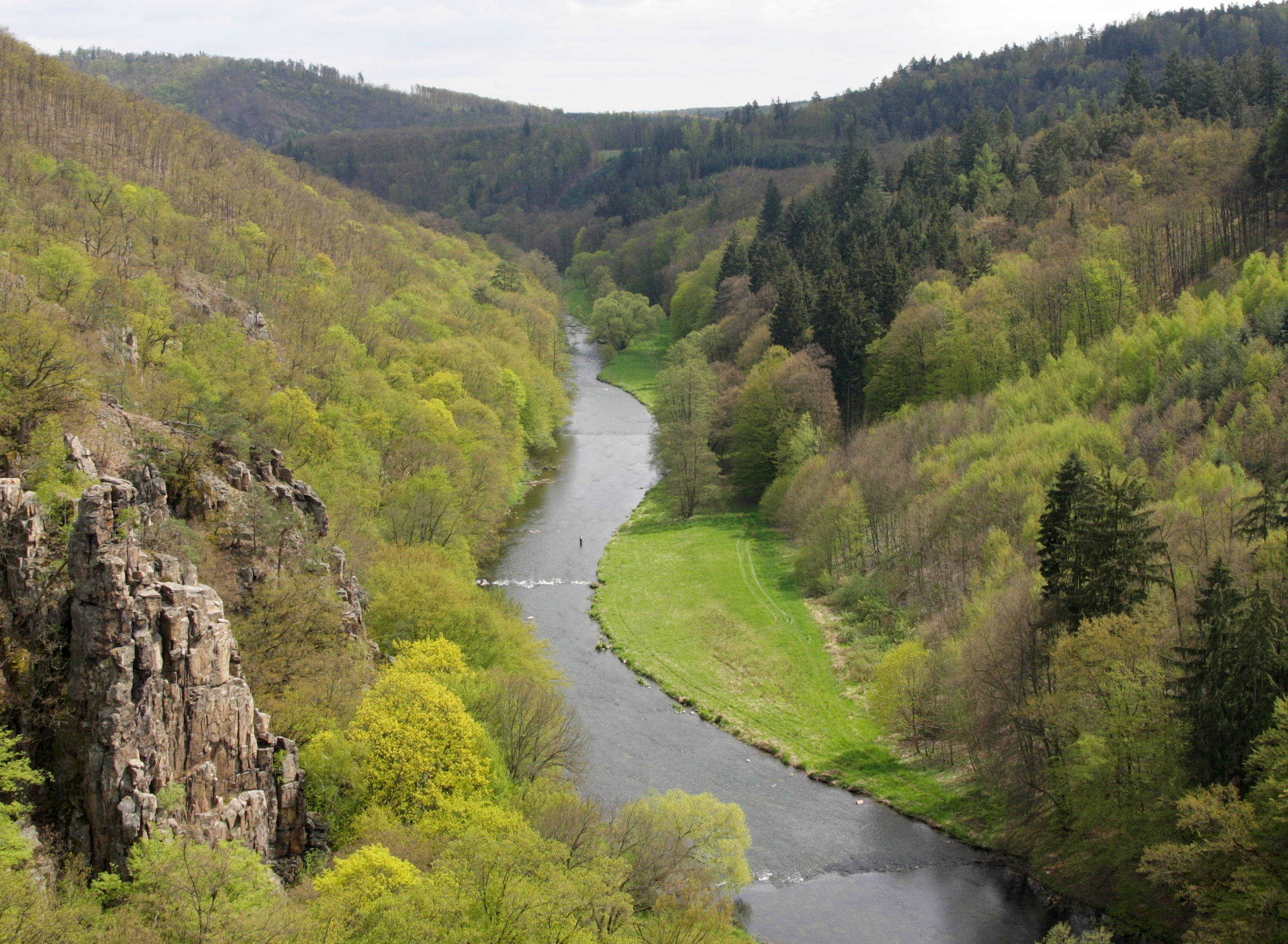
- The Jihlava at Lhánice

Location
- Country: Czech Republic
- Regions: Vysočina; South Moravian

Physical characteristics
- Source
  - location: Jihlávka, Křemešník Highlands
  - coordinates: 49°15′53″N 15°16′46″E
  - elevation: 666 m (2,185 ft)
- Mouth
  - location: Svratka
  - coordinates: 48°54′46″N 16°36′18″E
  - elevation: 169 m (554 ft)
- Length: 180.8 km (112.3 mi)
- Basin size: 2,996.5 km^{2} (1,157.0 sq mi)
- Discharge
  - average: 12 m^{3}/s (420 cu ft/s) near estuary

Basin features
- Progression: Svratka→ Thaya→ Morava→ Danube→ Black Sea

The Jihlava (Czech pronunciation: [ˈjɪɦlava]; German: Igel) is a river in the Czech Republic, a right tributary of the Svratka River. It flows through the Vysočina and South Moravian regions. It is 180.8 km (112.3 mi) long, making it the 8th longest river in the Czech Republic.

== Etymology ==
The first written mention of Jihlava (written as Giglaue) is from 1226, when it was referred to when demarcating the boundaries of the properties of the Želiv monastery. The origin of the name is often interpreted as coming from the German igel (i.e. 'hedgehog'), but a more likely origin is the Celtic word uig, meaning 'stream'.

== Characteristic ==
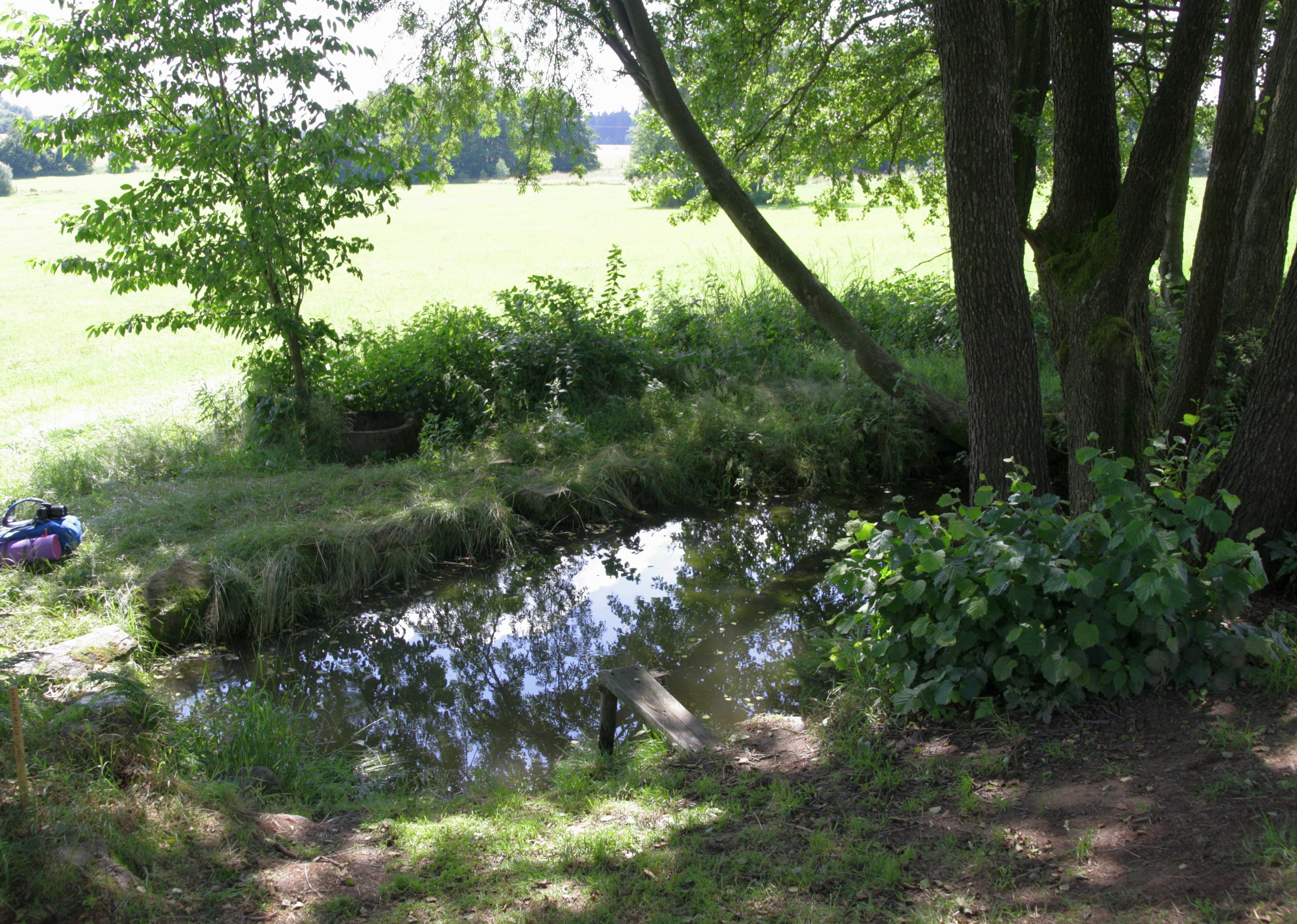
The source of the Jihlava

The Jihlava originates in the territory of Jihlávka in the Křemešník Highlands at an elevation of 666 m (2,185 ft) and flows to the Nové Mlýny reservoirs, where it enters the Svratka River in Ivaň at the elevation of 169 m (554 ft). It is 180.8 km (112.3 mi) long, making it the 8th longest river in the Czech Republic. Its drainage basin has an area of 2,996.5 km^{2} (1,157.0 sq mi).

The longest tributaries of the Jihlava are:

Tributary	Length (km)	River km	Side
Oslava	101.2	39.7	left
Rokytná	88.2	38.1	right
Brtnice	31.3	123.4	right
Třešťský potok	29.8	160.0	right
Jihlávka	25.7	142.6	right
Stařečský potok	19.3	97.9	right
Smrčenský potok	12.8	144.4	left
Klapovský potok	12.7	93.0	left
Hraniční potok	12.7	164.5	left
Rohozná	12.2	162.5	left

== Course ==
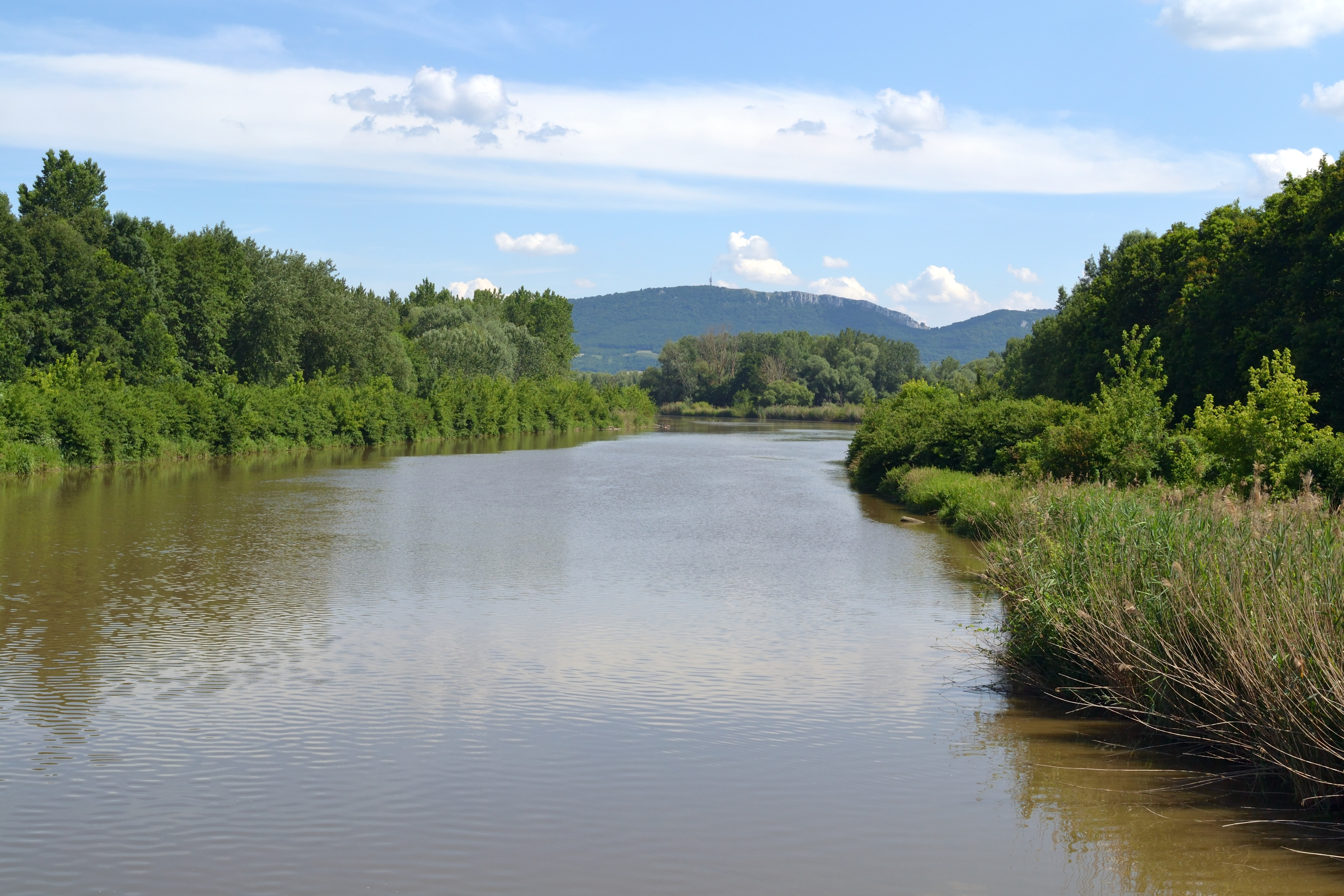
The Jihlava at its confluence with the Svratka

The most notable settlements on the river are the city of Jihlava, named after the river, and the town of Třebíč. The river flows through the municipal territories of Jihlávka, Horní Ves, Horní Cerekev, Batelov, Dolní Cerekev, Kostelec, Dvorce, Rantířov, Jihlava, Malý Beranov, Luka nad Jihlavou, Bítovčice, Bransouze, Číchov, Přibyslavice, Třebíč, Vladislav, Kramolín, Mohelno, Biskoupky, Ivančice, Moravské Bránice, Nové Bránice, Dolní Kounice, Pravlov, Kupařovice, Medlov, Pohořelice, Přibice and Ivaň.

== Bodies of water ==
There are 2,666 bodies of water in the basin area. The reservoirs Dalešice (463 ha (1,140 acres)) and Mohelno (75 ha (190 acres)) are constructed on the river and are the largest bodies of water in the basin area. Several small fishponds are built on the upper course of the river.

== Economy ==
The Dalešice Hydro Power Plant is built on the river between the Dalešice and Mohelno reservoirs.

The Jihlava is suitable for river tourism. Three of its sections are navigable.
