= Ivaň (Brno-Country District) =

- Municipality
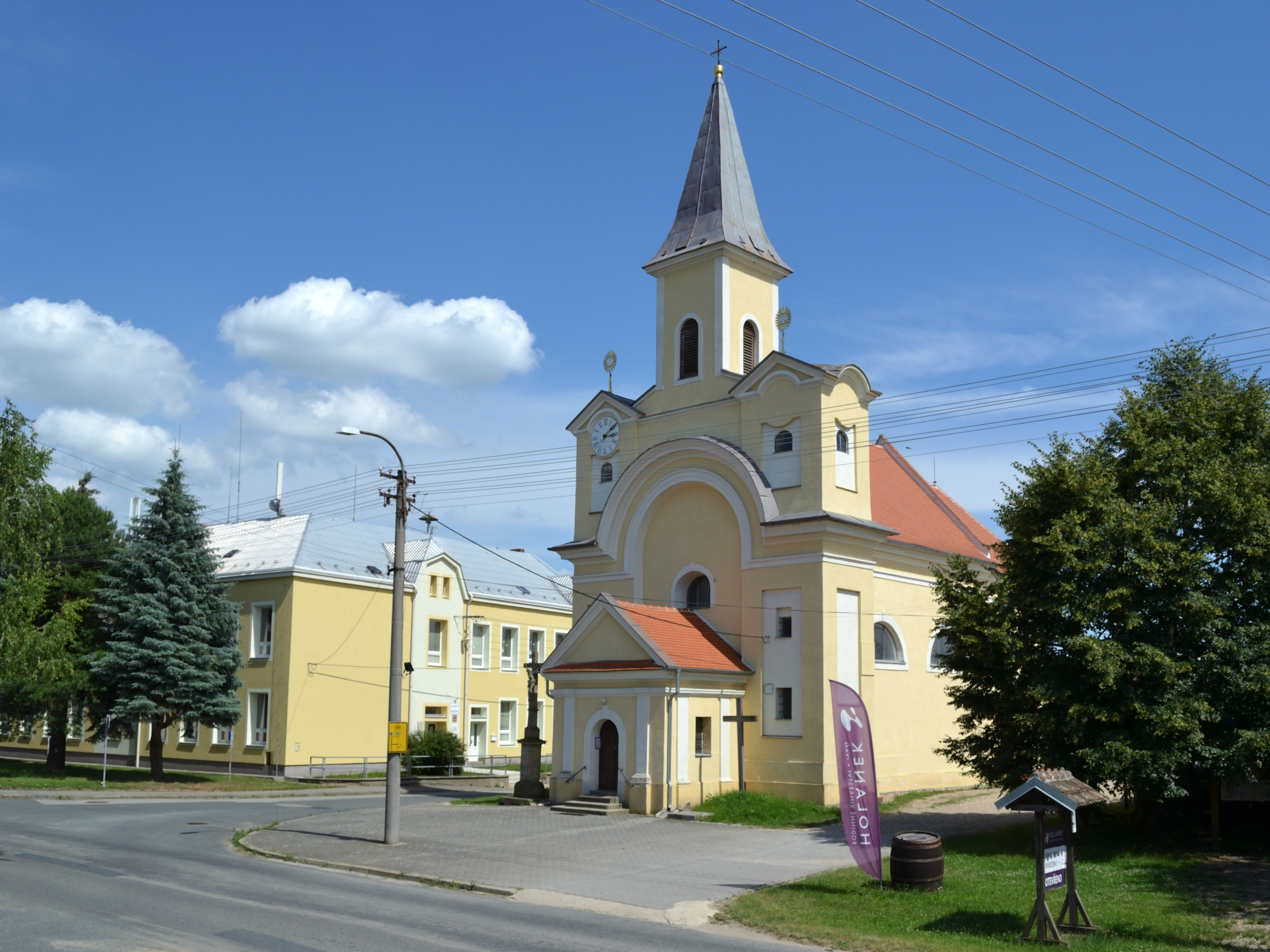
- Church of Saint Bartholomew

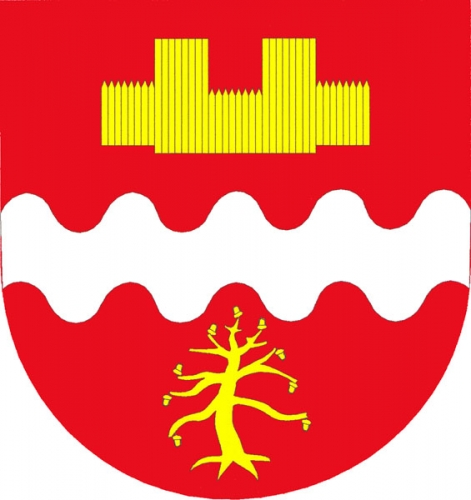
- Flag Coat of arms

- Location in the Czech Republic
- Coordinates: 48°55′47″N 16°34′33″E
- Country: Czech Republic
- Region: South Moravian
- District: Brno-Country
- First mentioned: 1257

Area
  - Total: 11.72 km^{2} (4.53 sq mi)
- Elevation: 172 m (564 ft)

Population (2026-01-01)
  - Total: 756
  - Density: 64.5/km^{2} (167/sq mi)
- Time zone: UTC+1 (CET)
  - Summer (DST): UTC+2 (CEST)
- Postal code: 691 23
- Website: www.obecivan.eu

Ivaň (German: Eibis) is a municipality and village in Brno-Country District in the South Moravian Region of the Czech Republic. It has about 800 inhabitants. It lies on the Jihlava River.

== History ==
The first written mention of Ivaň is from 1257.

== Demographics ==
Historical population
Year	Pop.	±%
1869	687	—
1880	644	−6.3%
1890	704	+9.3%
1900	797	+13.2%
1910	784	−1.6%
1921	774	−1.3%
1930	849	+9.7%
1950	709	−16.5%
1961	748	+5.5%
1970	743	−0.7%
1980	768	+3.4%
1991	702	−8.6%
2001	692	−1.4%
2011	710	+2.6%
2021	722	+1.7%
Source: Censuses
