= Moravské Bránice =

- Municipality
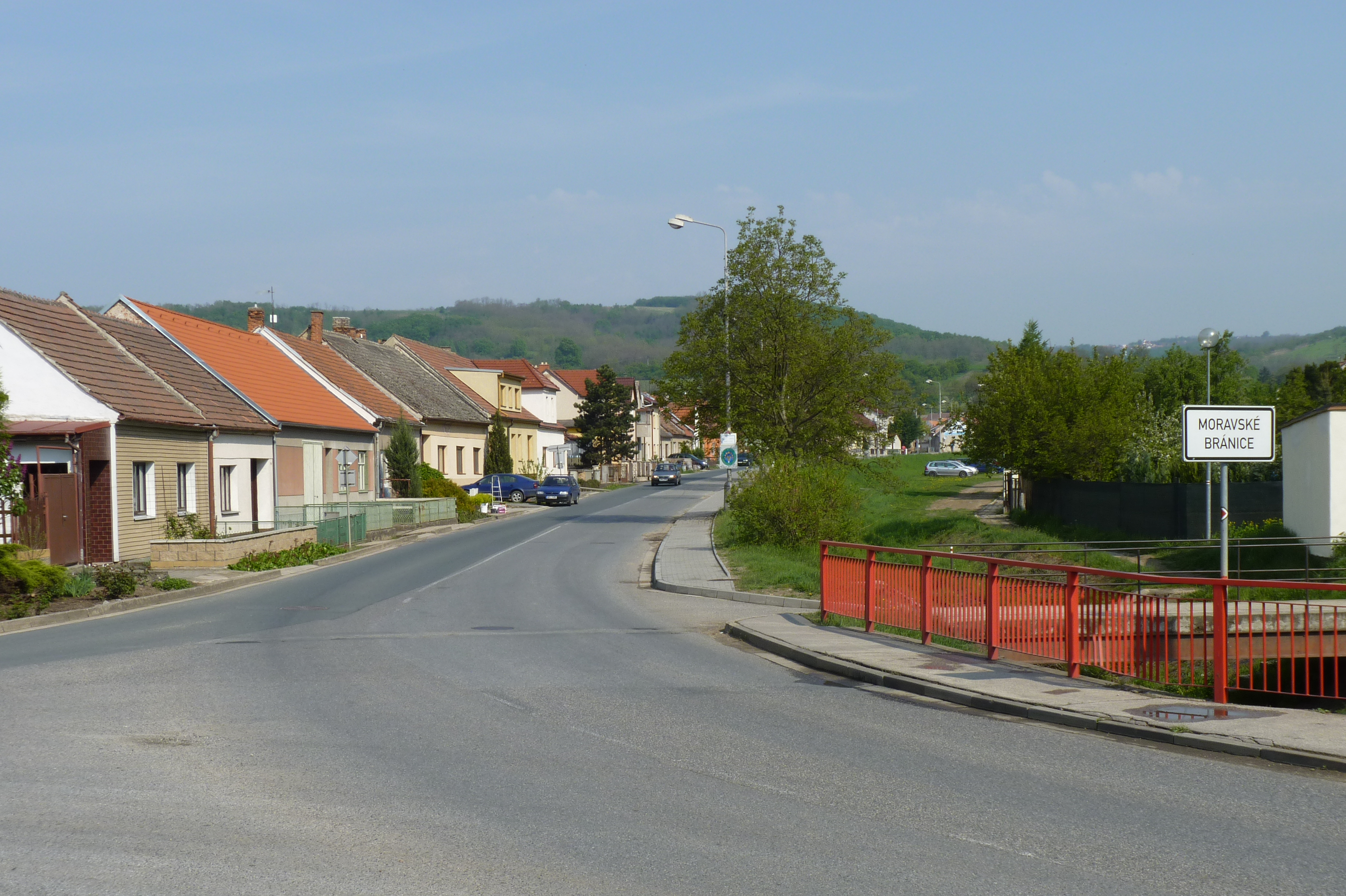
- Entrance to Moravské Bránice

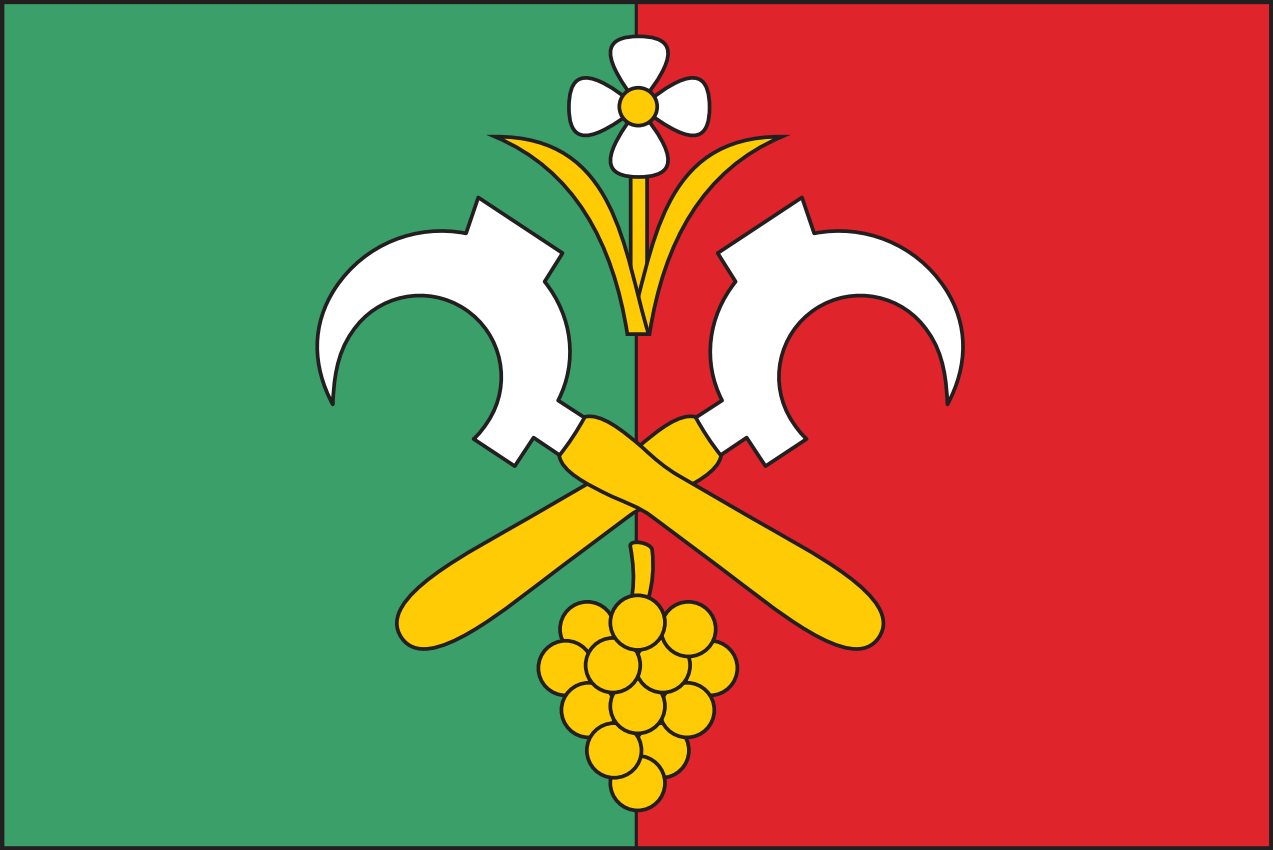
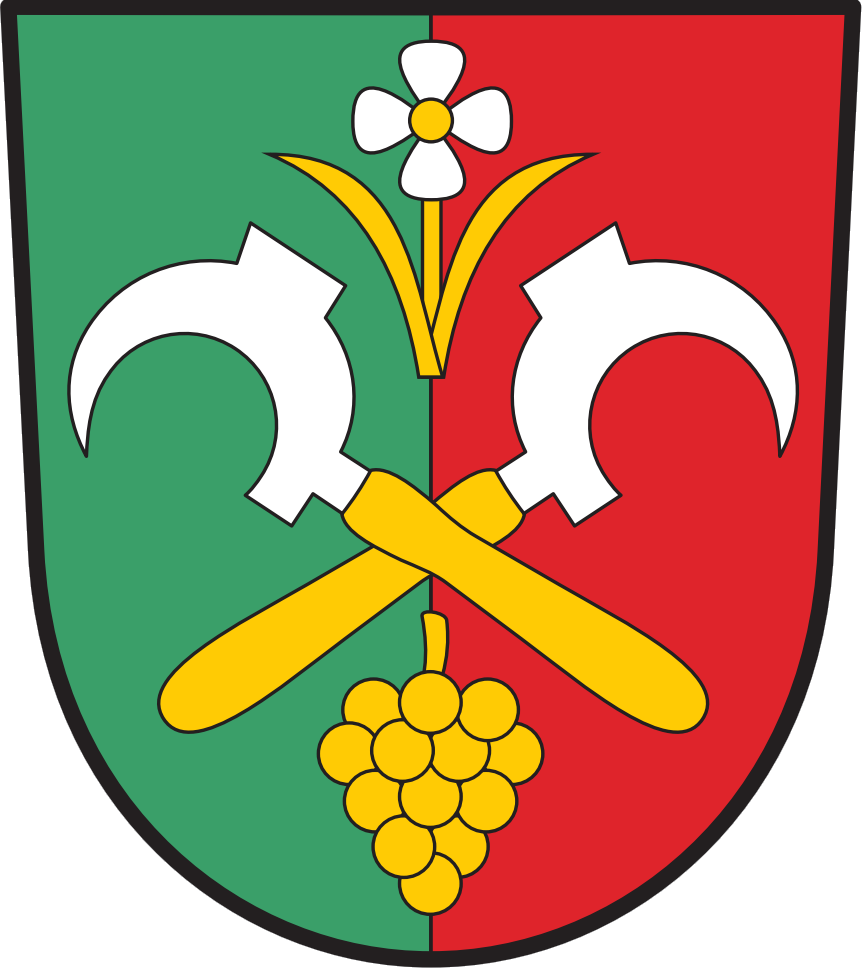
- Flag Coat of arms

- Location in the Czech Republic
- Coordinates: 49°5′0″N 16°26′11″E
- Country: Czech Republic
- Region: South Moravian
- District: Brno-Country
- First mentioned: 1181

Area
  - Total: 8.21 km^{2} (3.17 sq mi)
- Elevation: 205 m (673 ft)

Population (2026-01-01)
  - Total: 983
  - Density: 120/km^{2} (310/sq mi)
- Time zone: UTC+1 (CET)
  - Summer (DST): UTC+2 (CEST)
- Postal code: 664 64
- Website: www.moravskebranice.cz

Moravské Bránice (German: Mährisch Branitz) is a municipality and village in Brno-Country District in the South Moravian Region of the Czech Republic. It has about 1,000 inhabitants.

Moravské Bránice lies on the Jihlava River, approximately 19 kilometres (12 mi) south-west of Brno and 183 km (114 mi) south-east of Prague.

== Demographics ==
Historical population
Year	Pop.	±%
1869	592	—
1880	607	+2.5%
1890	609	+0.3%
1900	699	+14.8%
1910	767	+9.7%
1921	911	+18.8%
1930	1,078	+18.3%
1950	1,083	+0.5%
1961	1,159	+7.0%
1970	1,111	−4.1%
1980	938	−15.6%
1991	904	−3.6%
2001	913	+1.0%
2011	976	+6.9%
2021	952	−2.5%
Source: Censuses
