= Lhánice =

- Municipality
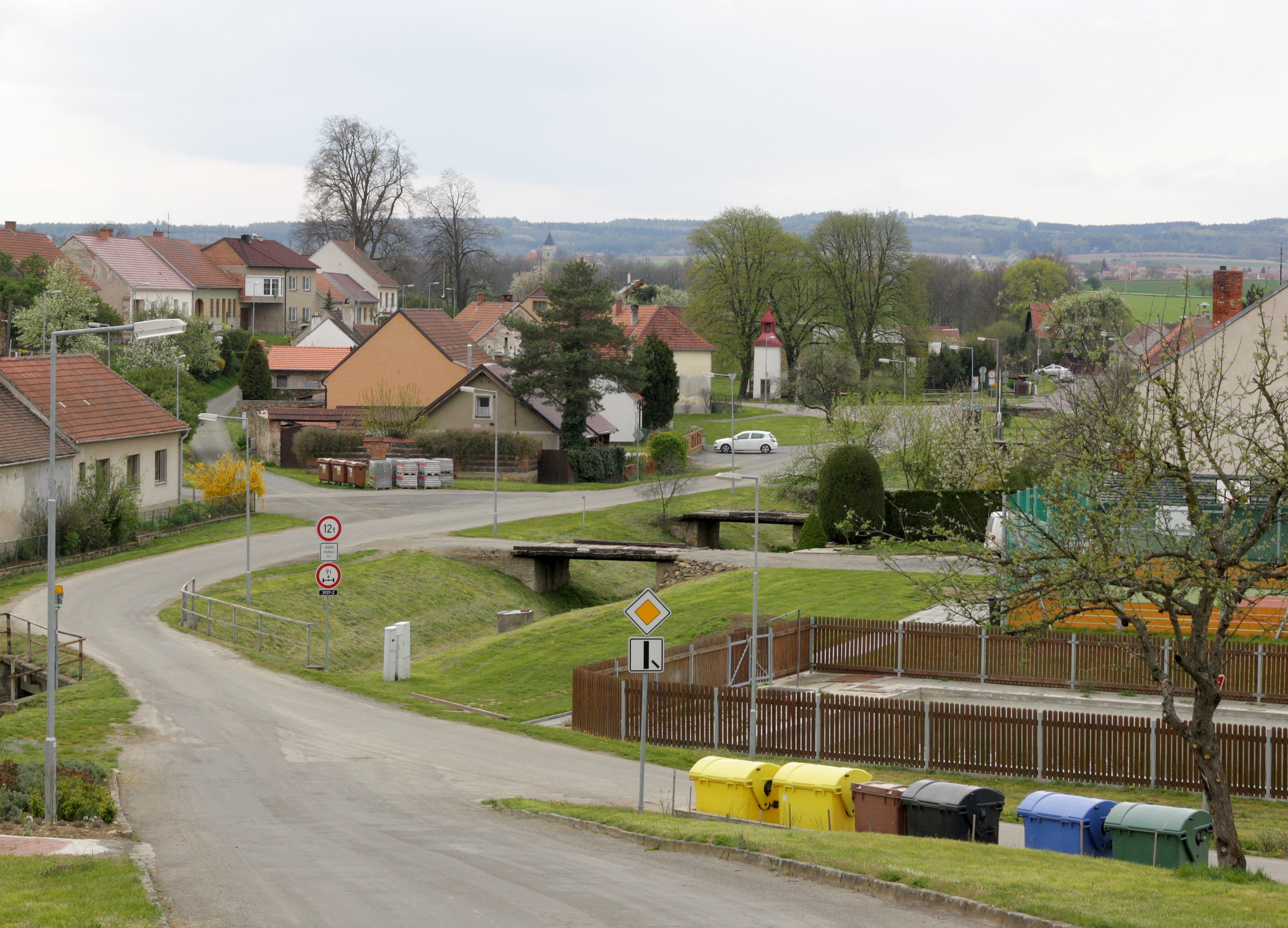
- Centre of Lhánice

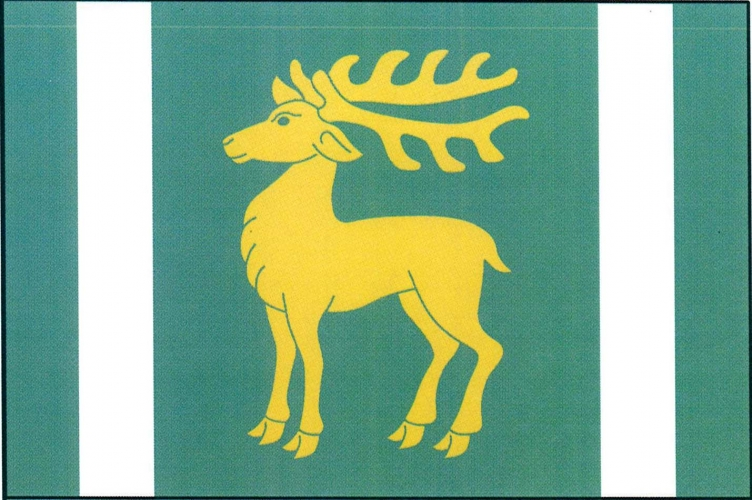
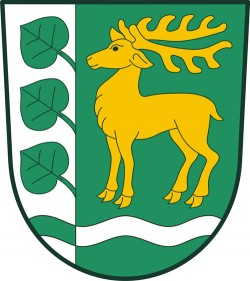
- Flag Coat of arms

- Location in the Czech Republic
- Coordinates: 49°6′33″N 16°13′24″E
- Country: Czech Republic
- Region: Vysočina
- District: Třebíč
- First mentioned: 1349

Area
  - Total: 6.46 km^{2} (2.49 sq mi)
- Elevation: 315 m (1,033 ft)

Population (2026-01-01)
  - Total: 182
  - Density: 28.2/km^{2} (73.0/sq mi)
- Time zone: UTC+1 (CET)
  - Summer (DST): UTC+2 (CEST)
- Postal code: 675 75
- Website: www.obeclhanice.cz

Lhánice is a municipality and village in Třebíč District in the Vysočina Region of the Czech Republic. It has about 200 inhabitants. The Jihlava River forms the southern municipal border.

== Demographics ==
Historical population
Year	Pop.	±%
1869	238	—
1880	267	+12.2%
1890	272	+1.9%
1900	313	+15.1%
1910	314	+0.3%
1921	329	+4.8%
1930	319	−3.0%
1950	259	−18.8%
1961	245	−5.4%
1970	230	−6.1%
1980	191	−17.0%
1991	166	−13.1%
2001	152	−8.4%
2011	155	+2.0%
2021	164	+5.8%
Source: Censuses
