= Jihlávka =

- Municipality
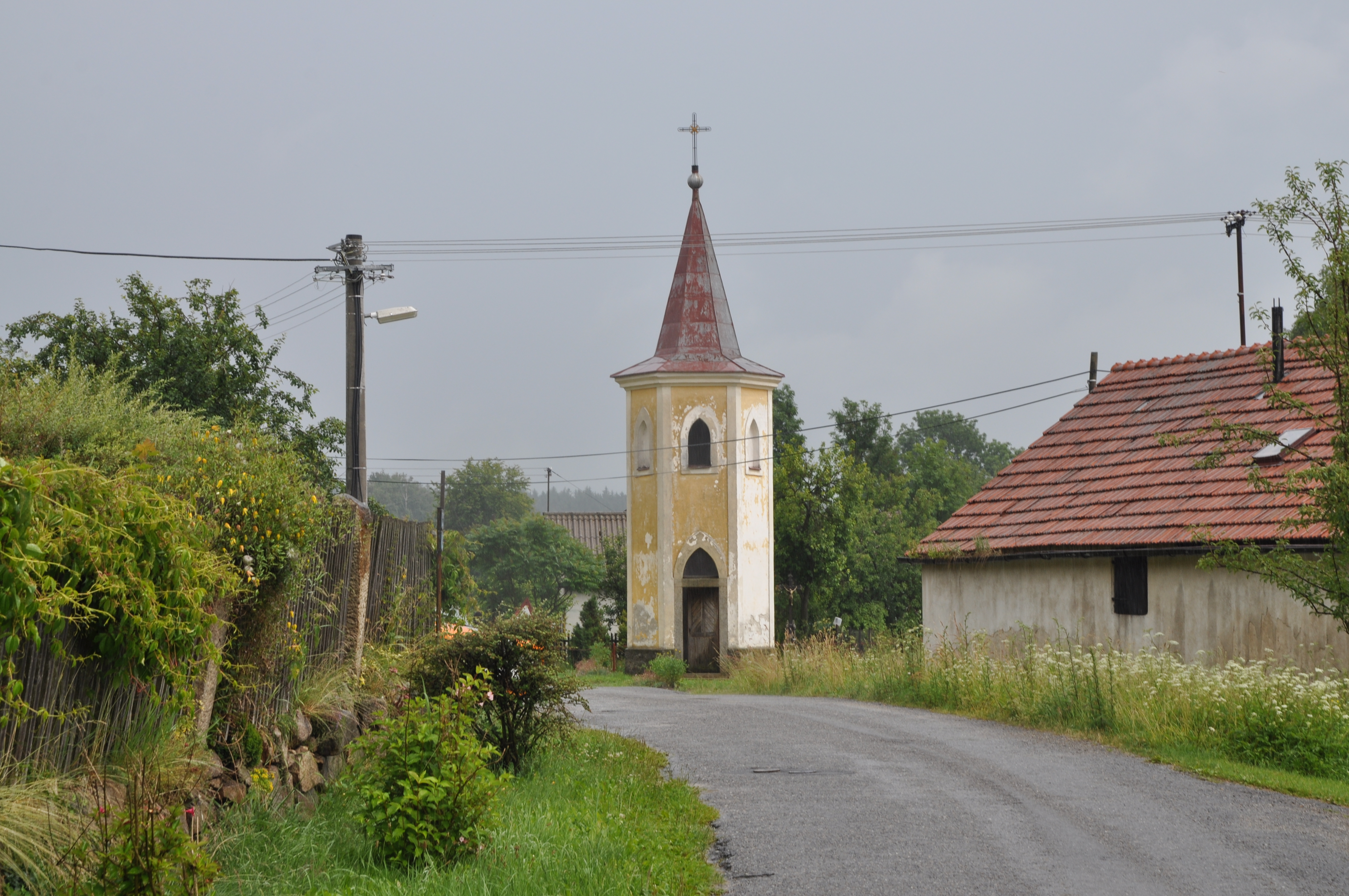
- Belfry

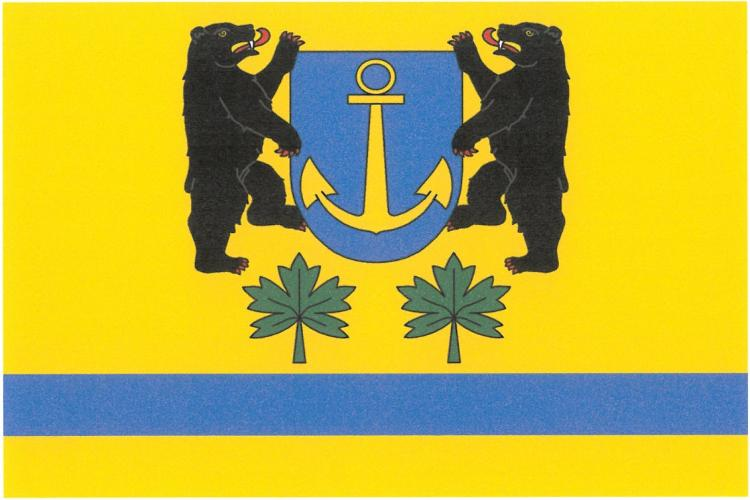
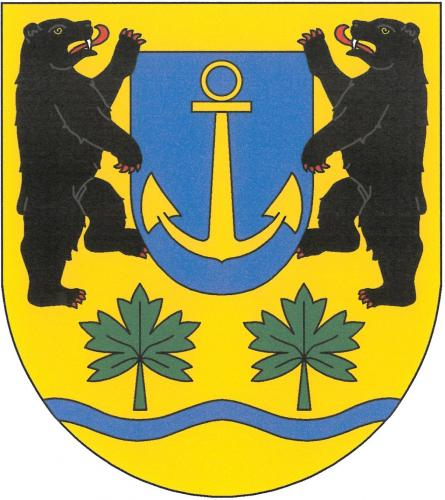
- Flag Coat of arms

- Location in the Czech Republic
- Coordinates: 49°15′40″N 15°17′33″E
- Country: Czech Republic
- Region: Vysočina
- District: Jihlava
- First mentioned: 1356

Area
  - Total: 8.39 km^{2} (3.24 sq mi)
- Elevation: 651 m (2,136 ft)

Population (2026-01-01)
  - Total: 222
  - Density: 26.5/km^{2} (68.5/sq mi)
- Time zone: UTC+1 (CET)
  - Summer (DST): UTC+2 (CEST)
- Postal code: 588 51
- Website: obecjihlavka.cz

Jihlávka (Czech pronunciation: [ˈjɪɦlaːfka]; German: Klein Iglau) is a municipality and village in Jihlava District in the Vysočina Region of the Czech Republic. It has about 200 inhabitants.

== Geography ==
Jihlávka is located about 26 kilometres (16 mi) southwest of Jihlava. It lies on the border between the Křemešník Highlands and Křižanov Highlands. The highest point is the hill Lísek at 760 m (2,493 ft) above sea level. The Jihlava River originates in the municipal territory. The upper course of the stream Hamerský potok flows along the southeastern municipal border. There are several fishponds in the municipality, the largest of which is Bor.

== Demographics ==
Historical population
Year	Pop.	±%
1869	435	—
1880	496	+14.0%
1890	488	−1.6%
1900	557	+14.1%
1910	577	+3.6%
1921	621	+7.6%
1930	649	+4.5%
1950	421	−35.1%
1961	430	+2.1%
1970	388	−9.8%
1980	337	−13.1%
1991	293	−13.1%
2001	232	−20.8%
2011	229	−1.3%
2021	188	−17.9%
Source: Censuses
