= Malý Beranov =

- Municipality
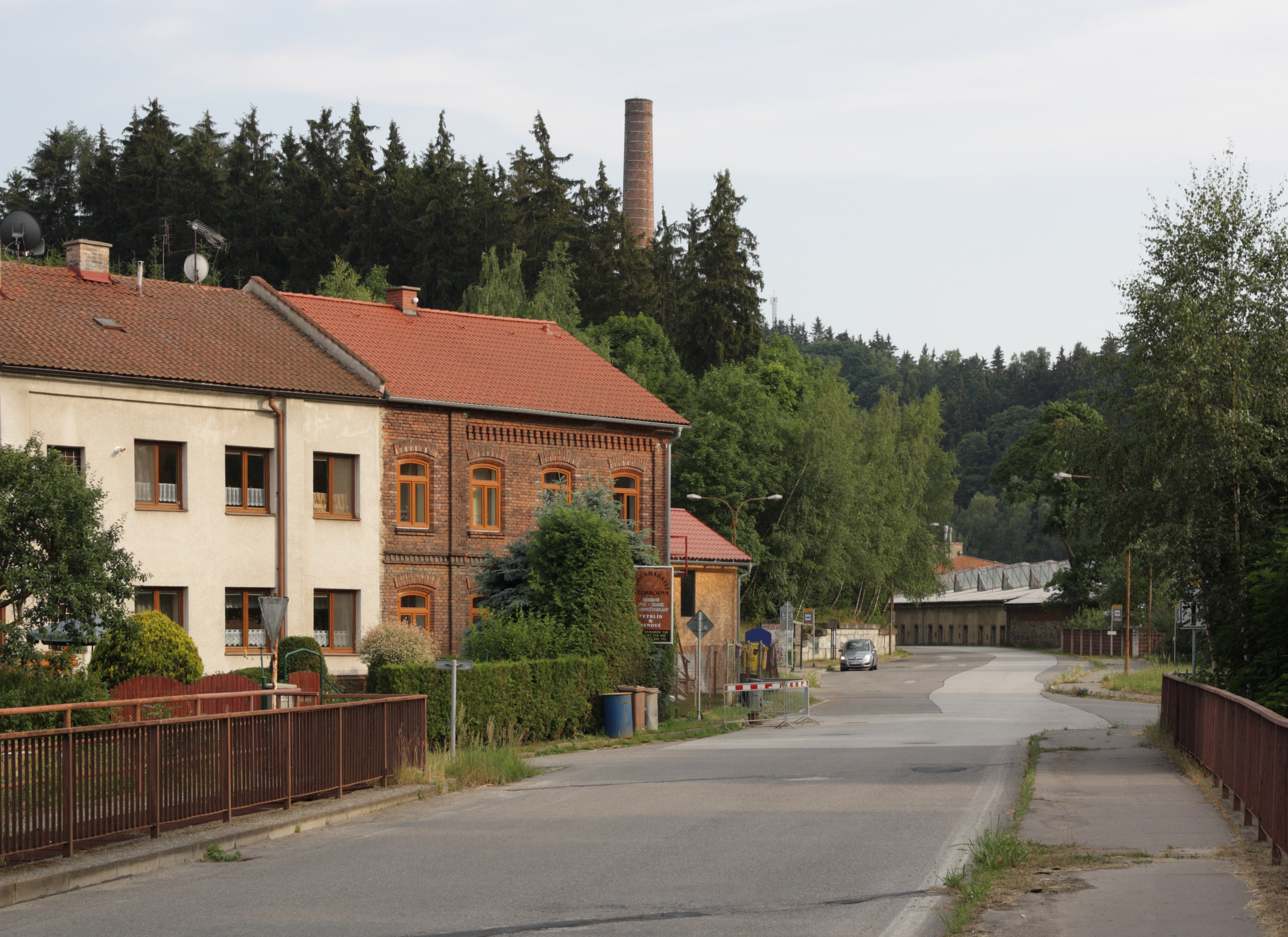
- Road over the Jihlava River

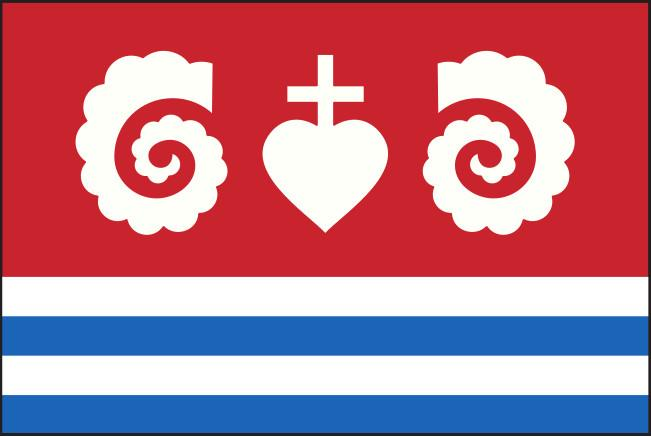
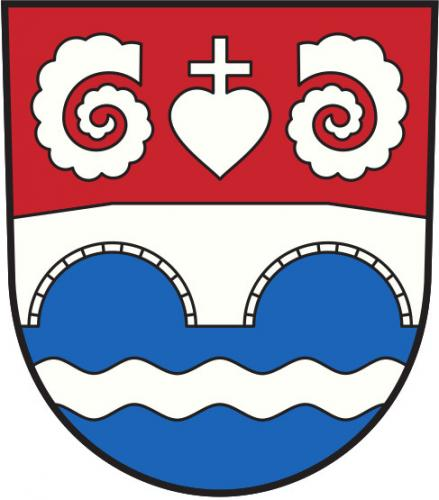
- Flag Coat of arms

- Location in the Czech Republic
- Coordinates: 49°23′48″N 15°38′16″E
- Country: Czech Republic
- Region: Vysočina
- District: Jihlava
- First mentioned: 1760

Area
  - Total: 1.00 km^{2} (0.39 sq mi)
- Elevation: 482 m (1,581 ft)

Population (2026-01-01)
  - Total: 649
  - Density: 649/km^{2} (1,680/sq mi)
- Time zone: UTC+1 (CET)
  - Summer (DST): UTC+2 (CEST)
- Postal code: 586 03
- Website: www.maly-beranov.cz

Malý Beranov (Czech pronunciation: [ˈmaliː ˈbɛranof]) is a municipality and village in Jihlava District in the Vysočina Region of the Czech Republic. It has about 600 inhabitants.

Malý Beranov lies on the Jihlava River, approximately 4 kilometres (2 mi) east of Jihlava and 117 km (73 mi) south-east of Prague.

== Demographics ==
Historical population
Year	Pop.	±%
1869	254	—
1880	241	−5.1%
1890	338	+40.2%
1900	453	+34.0%
1910	556	+22.7%
1921	458	−17.6%
1930	418	−8.7%
1950	392	−6.2%
1961	511	+30.4%
1970	442	−13.5%
1980	506	+14.5%
1991	541	+6.9%
2001	554	+2.4%
2011	586	+5.8%
2021	568	−3.1%
Source: Censuses
