= Pravlov =

- Municipality
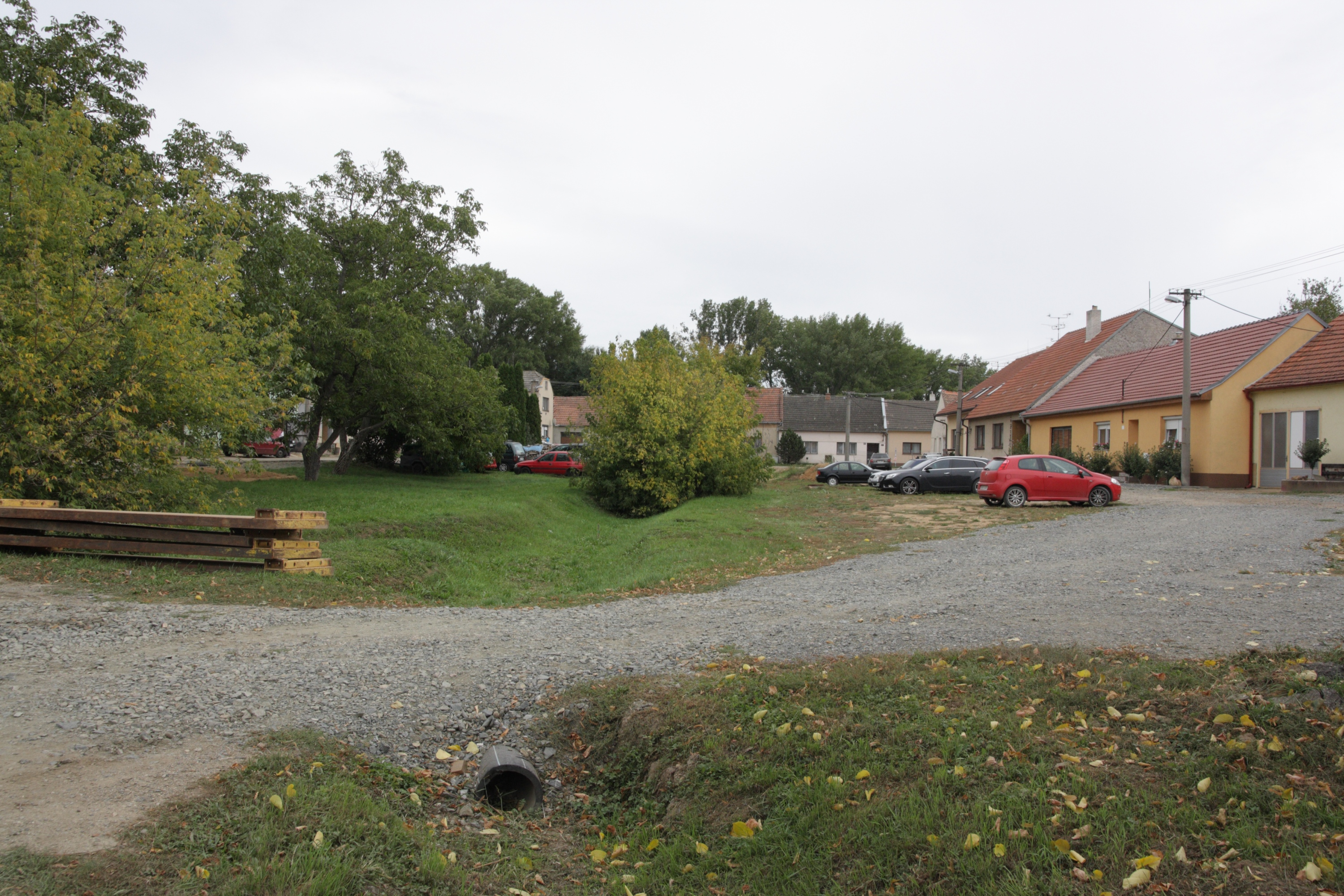
- Centre of Pravlov

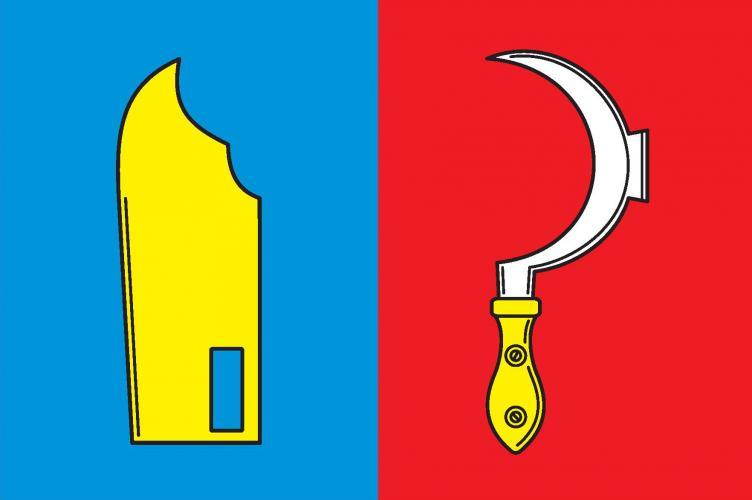
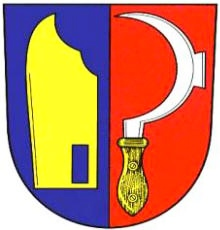
- Flag Coat of arms

- Location in the Czech Republic
- Coordinates: 49°3′21″N 16°29′16″E
- Country: Czech Republic
- Region: South Moravian
- District: Brno-Country
- First mentioned: 1073

Area
  - Total: 2.91 km^{2} (1.12 sq mi)
- Elevation: 190 m (620 ft)

Population (2026-01-01)
  - Total: 692
  - Density: 238/km^{2} (616/sq mi)
- Time zone: UTC+1 (CET)
  - Summer (DST): UTC+2 (CEST)
- Postal code: 664 64
- Website: www.pravlov.cz

Pravlov (German: Prahlitz) is a municipality and village in Brno-Country District in the South Moravian Region of the Czech Republic. It has about 700 inhabitants.

Pravlov lies on the Jihlava River, approximately 19 kilometres (12 mi) south-west of Brno and 188 km (117 mi) south-east of Prague.

== Demographics ==
Historical population
Year	Pop.	±%
1869	631	—
1880	670	+6.2%
1890	590	−11.9%
1900	623	+5.6%
1910	646	+3.7%
1921	582	−9.9%
1930	590	+1.4%
1950	469	−20.5%
1961	514	+9.6%
1970	478	−7.0%
1980	516	+7.9%
1991	491	−4.8%
2001	525	+6.9%
2011	574	+9.3%
2021	653	+13.8%
Source: Censuses
