= Přibyslavice (Třebíč District) =

- Municipality
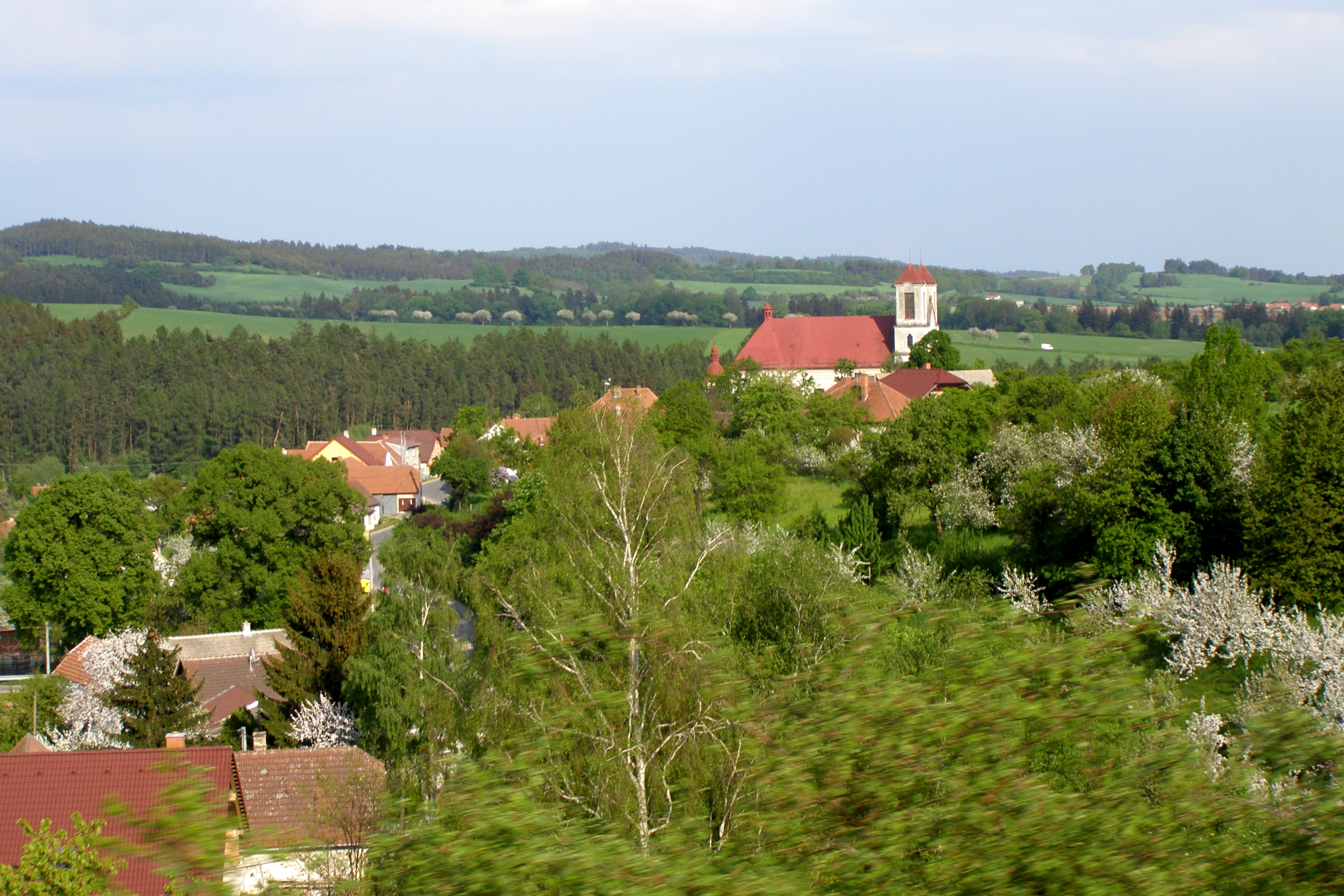
- General view

- Flag Coat of arms

- Location in the Czech Republic
- Coordinates: 49°15′38″N 15°46′42″E
- Country: Czech Republic
- Region: Vysočina
- District: Třebíč
- First mentioned: 1224

Area
  - Total: 6.15 km^{2} (2.37 sq mi)
- Elevation: 478 m (1,568 ft)

Population (2026-01-01)
  - Total: 794
  - Density: 129/km^{2} (334/sq mi)
- Time zone: UTC+1 (CET)
  - Summer (DST): UTC+2 (CEST)
- Postal code: 675 21
- Website: www.pribyslavice.cz

Přibyslavice is a municipality and village in Třebíč District in the Vysočina Region of the Czech Republic. It has about 800 inhabitants.

Přibyslavice lies on the Jihlava River, approximately 10 kilometres (6 mi) north-west of Třebíč, 21 km (13 mi) south-east of Jihlava, and 134 km (83 mi) south-east of Prague.

== Demographics ==
Historical population
Year	Pop.	±%
1869	567	—
1880	475	−16.2%
1890	524	+10.3%
1900	604	+15.3%
1910	716	+18.5%
1921	737	+2.9%
1930	729	−1.1%
1950	643	−11.8%
1961	668	+3.9%
1970	793	+18.7%
1980	791	−0.3%
1991	812	+2.7%
2001	814	+0.2%
2011	776	−4.7%
2021	780	+0.5%
Source: Censuses
