= Přibice =

- Municipality
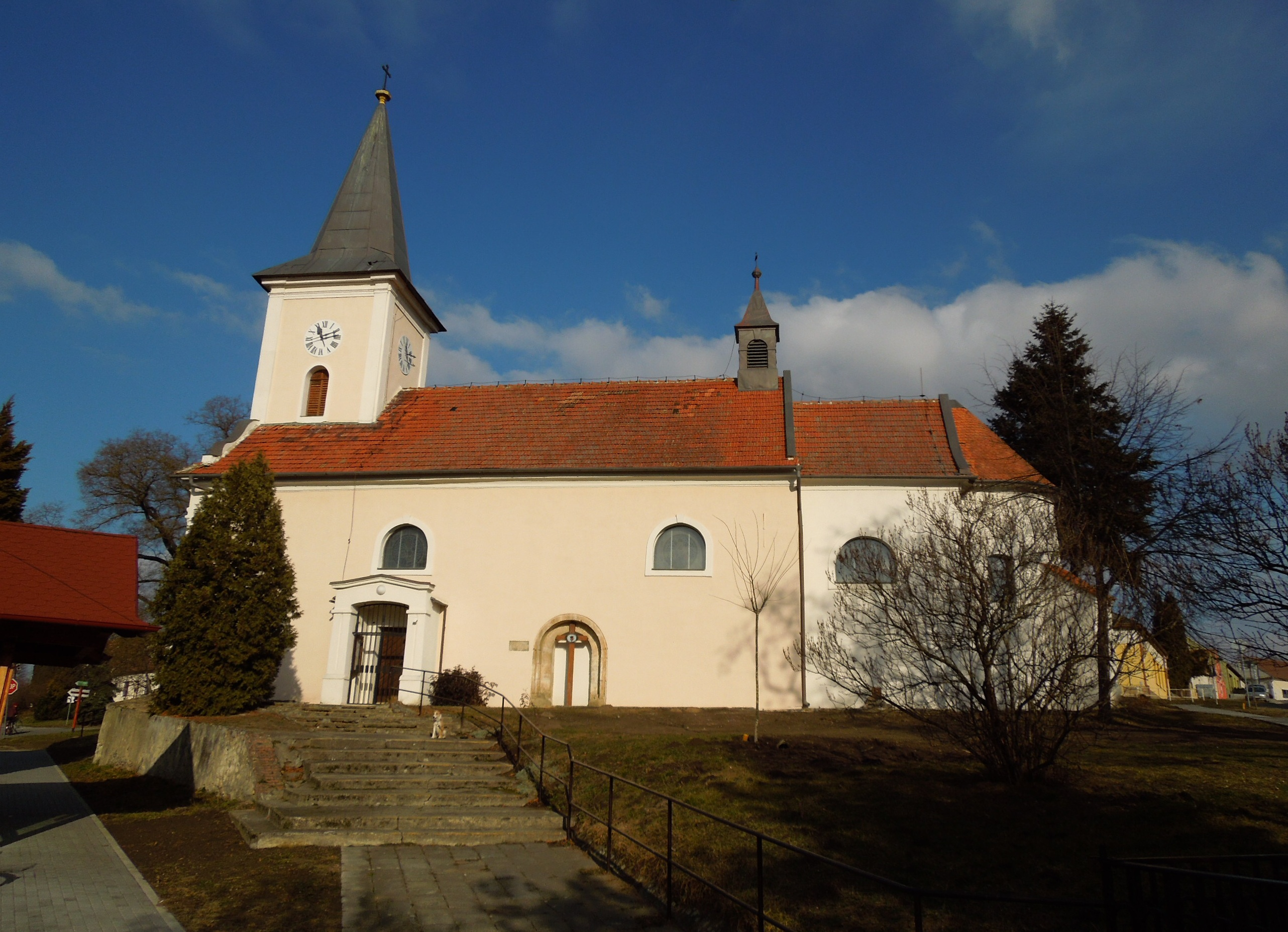
- Church of Saint John the Baptist

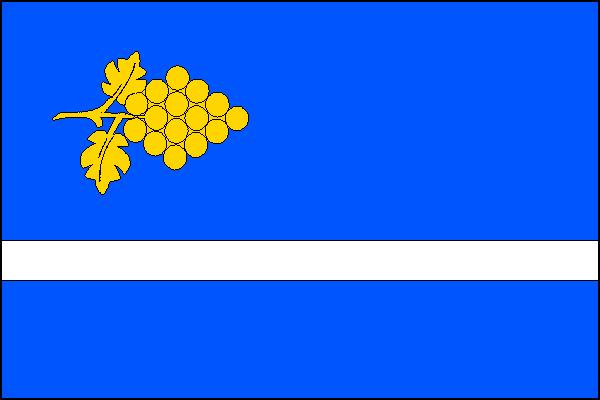
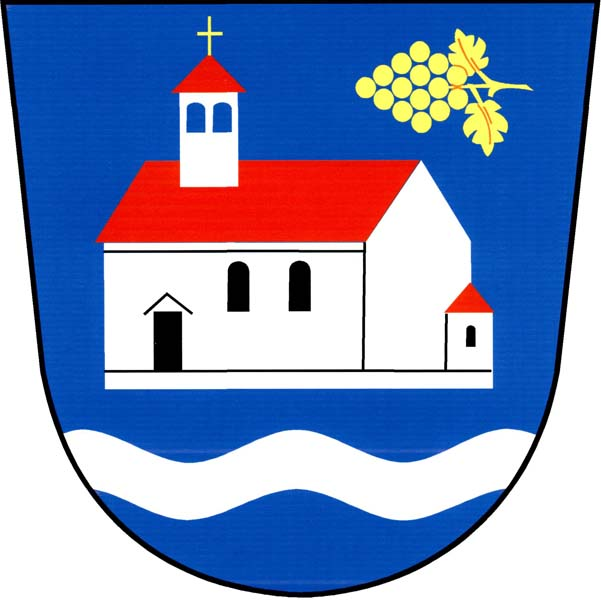
- Flag Coat of arms

- Location in the Czech Republic
- Coordinates: 48°57′42″N 16°34′24″E
- Country: Czech Republic
- Region: South Moravian
- District: Brno-Country
- First mentioned: 1222

Area
  - Total: 7.45 km^{2} (2.88 sq mi)
- Elevation: 180 m (590 ft)

Population (2026-01-01)
  - Total: 1,123
  - Density: 151/km^{2} (390/sq mi)
- Time zone: UTC+1 (CET)
  - Summer (DST): UTC+2 (CEST)
- Postal code: 691 24
- Website: www.pribice.cz

Přibice (German: Pribitz) is a municipality and village in Brno-Country District in the South Moravian Region of the Czech Republic. It has about 1,100 inhabitants.

Přibice lies on the Jihlava River, approximately 27 kilometres (17 mi) south of Brno and 200 km (120 mi) south-east of Prague.

== Demographics ==
Historical population
Year	Pop.	±%
1869	762	—
1880	906	+18.9%
1890	1,018	+12.4%
1900	1,053	+3.4%
1910	1,145	+8.7%
1921	1,145	+0.0%
1930	1,235	+7.9%
1950	1,270	+2.8%
1961	1,310	+3.1%
1970	1,284	−2.0%
1980	1,123	−12.5%
1991	1,010	−10.1%
2001	999	−1.1%
2011	1,063	+6.4%
2021	1,012	−4.8%
Source: Censuses
