= Číchov =

- Municipality
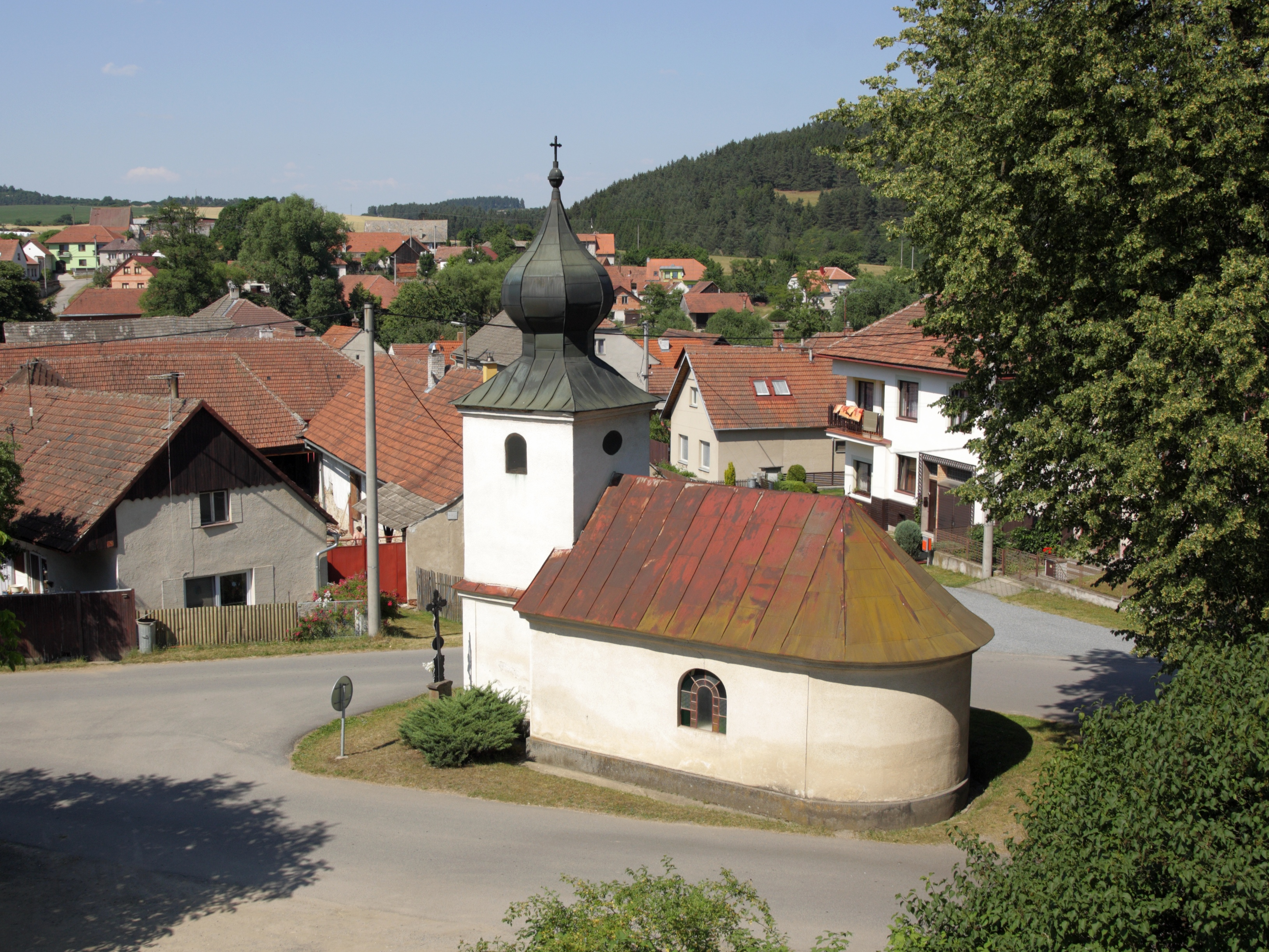
- Chapel of the Virgin Mary

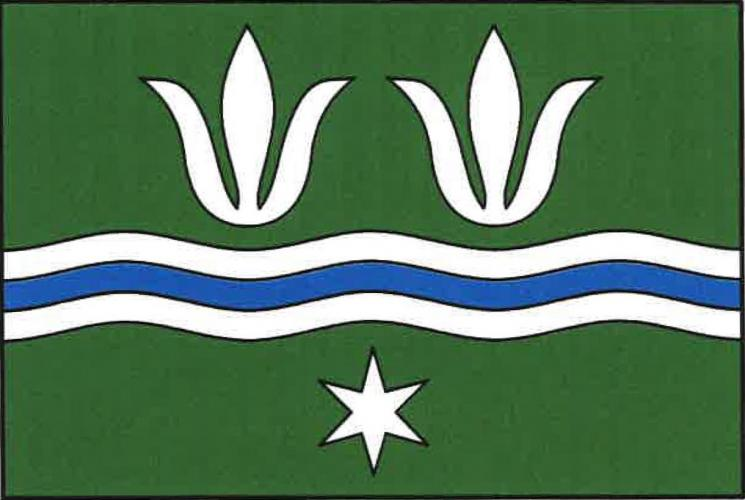
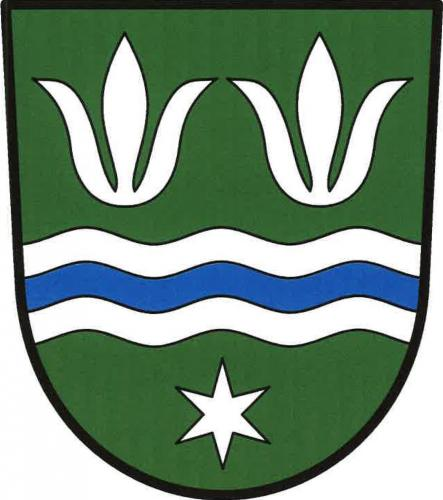
- Flag Coat of arms

- Location in the Czech Republic
- Coordinates: 49°17′5″N 15°45′44″E
- Country: Czech Republic
- Region: Vysočina
- District: Třebíč
- First mentioned: 1101

Area
  - Total: 9.57 km^{2} (3.69 sq mi)
- Elevation: 420 m (1,380 ft)

Population (2026-01-01)
  - Total: 218
  - Density: 22.8/km^{2} (59.0/sq mi)
- Time zone: UTC+1 (CET)
  - Summer (DST): UTC+2 (CEST)
- Postal code: 675 21
- Website: www.cichov.cz

Číchov is a municipality and village in Třebíč District in the Vysočina Region of the Czech Republic. It has about 200 inhabitants.

== Geography ==
Číchov is located about 11 kilometres (7 mi) northwest of Třebíč and 17 km (11 mi) southeast of Jihlava. It lies in the Křižanov Highlands. The highest point is the hill Velká hora at 614 m (2,014 ft) above sea level. The Jihlava River flows through the municipality.

== History ==
The first written mention of Číchov is from 1101. Originally there were two separate municipalities: Čichov (Třebíčský Číchov) and Číchov (Brtnický Číchov), divided by the Jihlava River. In 1870, they were merged into one municipality.

== Demographics ==
Historical population

Year	Pop.	±%
1869	403	—
1880	366	−9.2%
1890	387	+5.7%
1900	382	−1.3%
1910	428	+12.0%

Year	Pop.	±%
1921	411	−4.0%
1930	417	+1.5%
1950	398	−4.6%
1961	373	−6.3%
1970	340	−8.8%

Year	Pop.	±%
1980	334	−1.8%
1991	284	−15.0%
2001	289	+1.8%
2011	238	−17.6%
2021	216	−9.2%

Source: Censuses

== Transport ==
Číchov is located on the railway line Jihlava–Třebíč.

== Sights ==
There are no protected cultural monuments in the municipality. In the centre of Číchov is the Chapel of the Virgin Mary.
