= Kramolín (Třebíč District) =

- Municipality
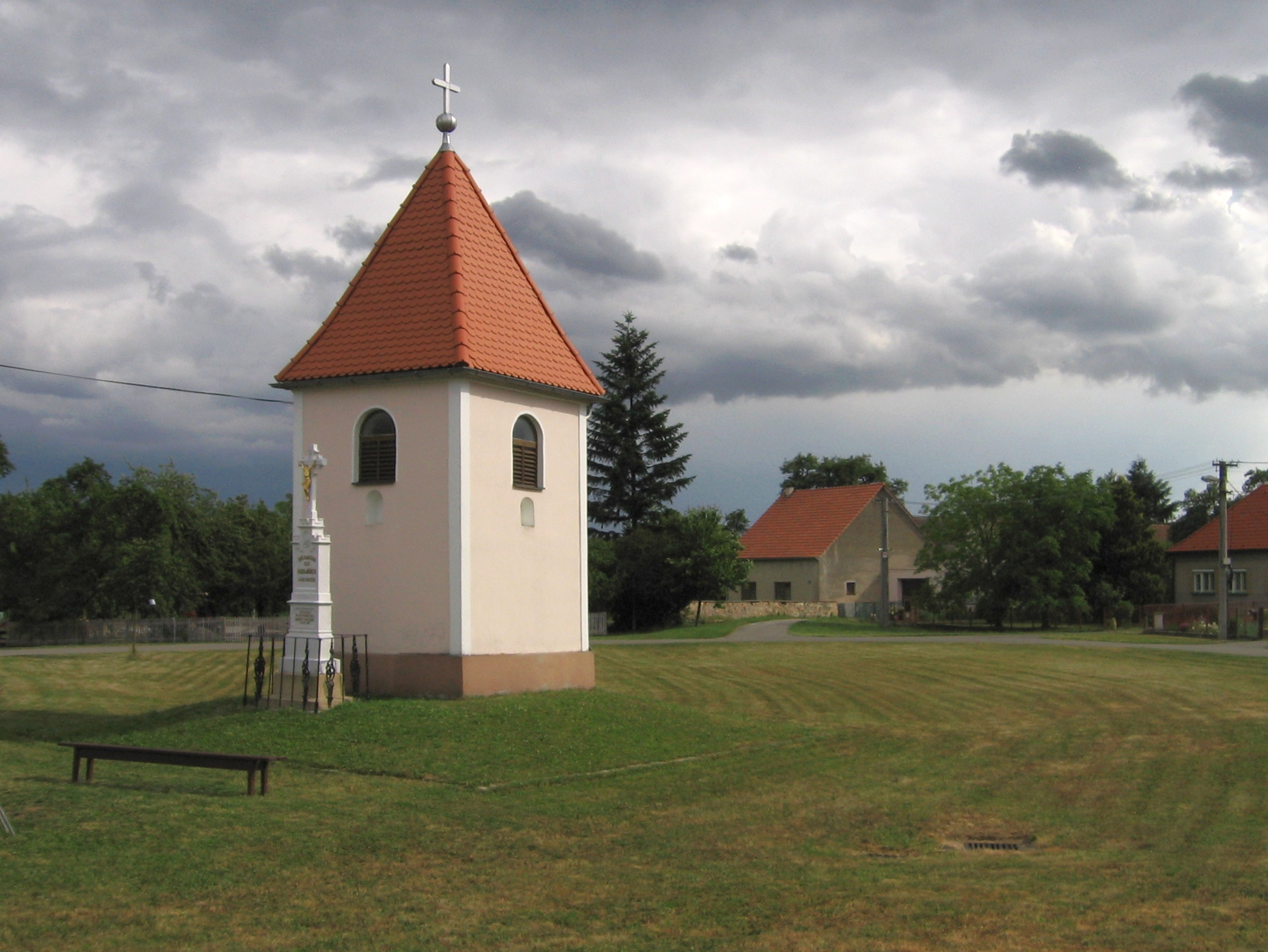
- Belfry in the centre of Kramolín

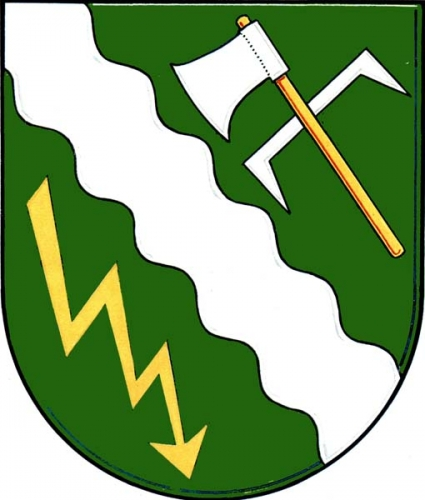
- Flag Coat of arms

- Location in the Czech Republic
- Coordinates: 49°8′3″N 16°7′55″E
- Country: Czech Republic
- Region: Vysočina
- District: Třebíč
- First mentioned: 1368

Area
  - Total: 4.96 km^{2} (1.92 sq mi)
- Elevation: 426 m (1,398 ft)

Population (2026-01-01)
  - Total: 131
  - Density: 26.4/km^{2} (68.4/sq mi)
- Time zone: UTC+1 (CET)
  - Summer (DST): UTC+2 (CEST)
- Postal code: 675 77
- Website: www.obeckramolin.cz

Kramolín is a municipality and village in Třebíč District in the Vysočina Region of the Czech Republic. It has about 100 inhabitants.

Kramolín lies on the shore of Dalešice Reservoir, approximately 21 kilometres (13 mi) south-east of Třebíč, 49 km (30 mi) south-east of Jihlava, and 163 km (101 mi) south-east of Prague.

== Demographics ==
Historical population
Year	Pop.	±%
1869	149	—
1880	164	+10.1%
1890	156	−4.9%
1900	172	+10.3%
1910	181	+5.2%
1921	201	+11.0%
1930	158	−21.4%
1950	147	−7.0%
1961	159	+8.2%
1970	164	+3.1%
1980	148	−9.8%
1991	117	−20.9%
2001	121	+3.4%
2011	121	+0.0%
2021	133	+9.9%
Source: Censuses
