= Švábov =

- Municipality
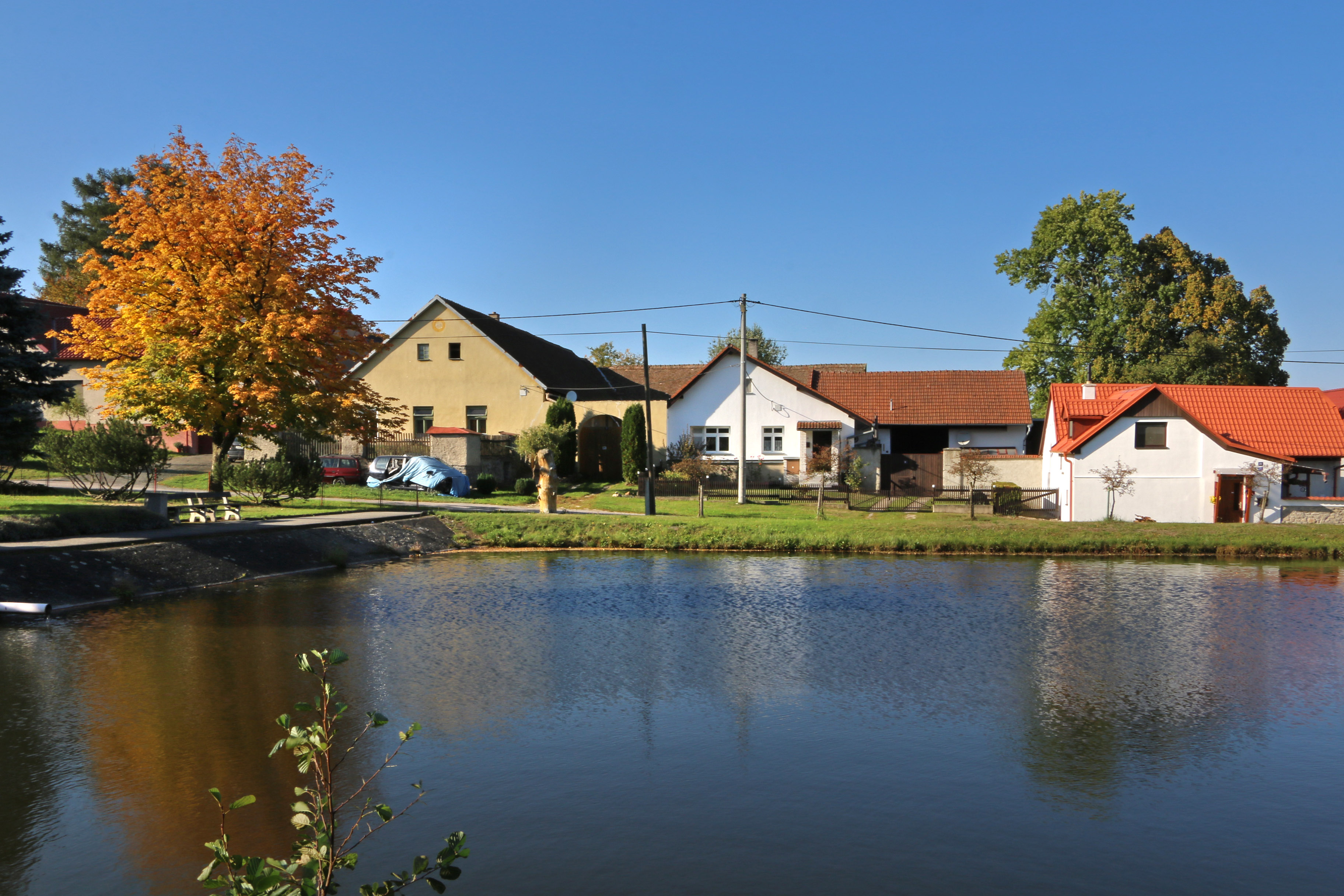
- Centre of Švábov

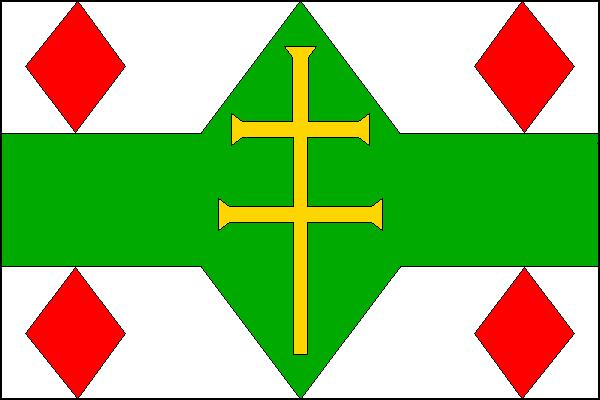
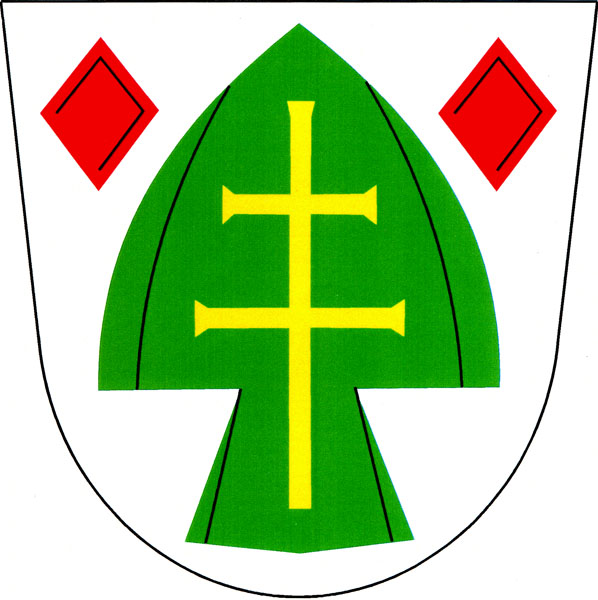
- Flag Coat of arms

- Location in the Czech Republic
- Coordinates: 49°18′31″N 15°21′25″E
- Country: Czech Republic
- Region: Vysočina
- District: Jihlava
- First mentioned: 1534

Area
  - Total: 5.00 km^{2} (1.93 sq mi)
- Elevation: 584 m (1,916 ft)

Population (2026-01-01)
  - Total: 86
  - Density: 17/km^{2} (45/sq mi)
- Time zone: UTC+1 (CET)
  - Summer (DST): UTC+2 (CEST)
- Postal codes: 588 51
- Website: www.svabov.cz

Švábov (Czech pronunciation: [ˈʃvaːbof]; German: Schwabau) is a municipality and village in Jihlava District in the Vysočina Region of the Czech Republic. It has about 90 inhabitants.

Švábov lies approximately 20 kilometres (12 mi) south-west of Jihlava and 110 km (68 mi) south-east of Prague.

== Demographics ==
Historical population
Year	Pop.	±%
1869	199	—
1880	196	−1.5%
1890	181	−7.7%
1900	206	+13.8%
1910	194	−5.8%
1921	220	+13.4%
1930	203	−7.7%
1950	139	−31.5%
1961	134	−3.6%
1970	121	−9.7%
1980	121	+0.0%
1991	97	−19.8%
2001	89	−8.2%
2011	66	−25.8%
2021	75	+13.6%
Source: Censuses
