= Dudín =

- Municipality
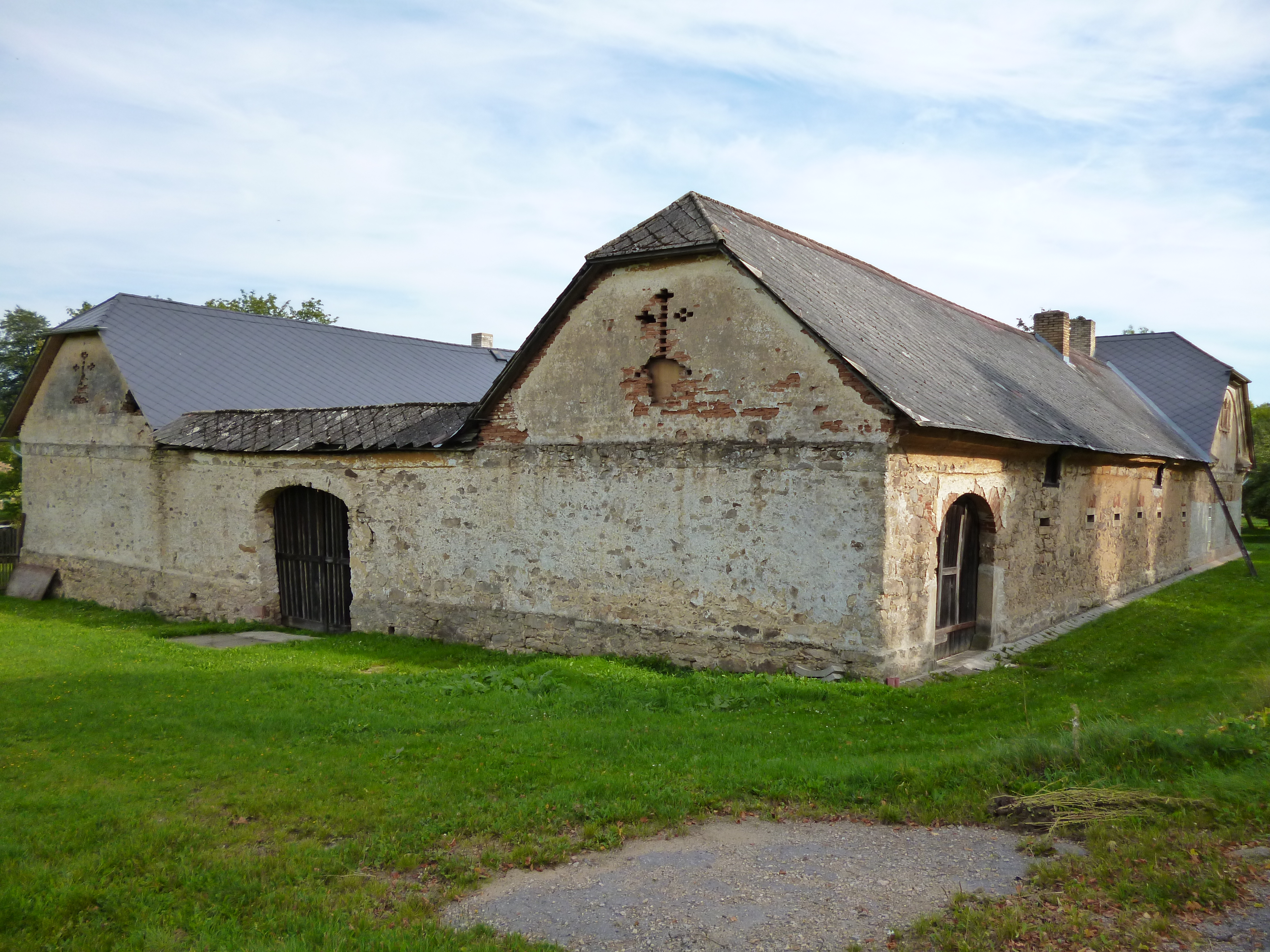
- Former inn, a cultural monument

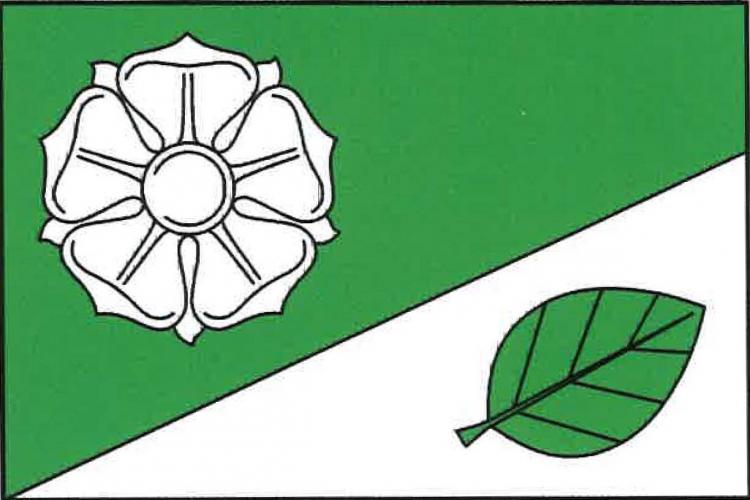
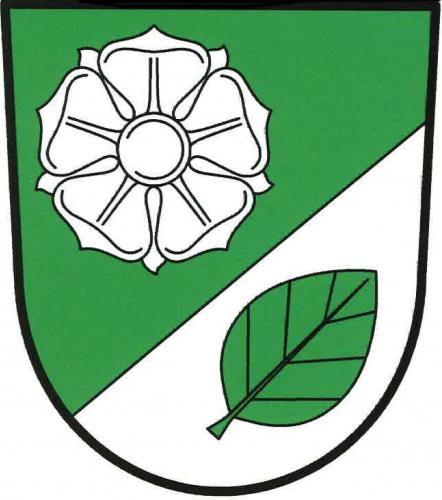
- Flag Coat of arms

- Location in the Czech Republic
- Coordinates: 49°27′4″N 15°23′52″E
- Country: Czech Republic
- Region: Vysočina
- District: Jihlava
- First mentioned: 1226

Area
  - Total: 8.36 km^{2} (3.23 sq mi)
- Elevation: 627 m (2,057 ft)

Population (2026-01-01)
  - Total: 204
  - Density: 24.4/km^{2} (63.2/sq mi)
- Time zone: UTC+1 (CET)
  - Summer (DST): UTC+2 (CEST)
- Postal code: 588 05
- Website: www.dudin.cz

Dudín (Czech pronunciation: [ˈduɟiːn]) is a municipality and village in Jihlava District in the Vysočina Region of the Czech Republic. It has about 200 inhabitants.

Dudín lies approximately 17 kilometres (11 mi) north-west of Jihlava and 99 km (62 mi) south-east of Prague.

== Demographics ==
Historical population
Year	Pop.	±%
1869	482	—
1880	556	+15.4%
1890	522	−6.1%
1900	468	−10.3%
1910	460	−1.7%
1921	428	−7.0%
1930	374	−12.6%
1950	286	−23.5%
1961	238	−16.8%
1970	168	−29.4%
1980	150	−10.7%
1991	143	−4.7%
2001	148	+3.5%
2011	174	+17.6%
2021	175	+0.6%
Source: Censuses
