= Vystrčenovice =

- Municipality
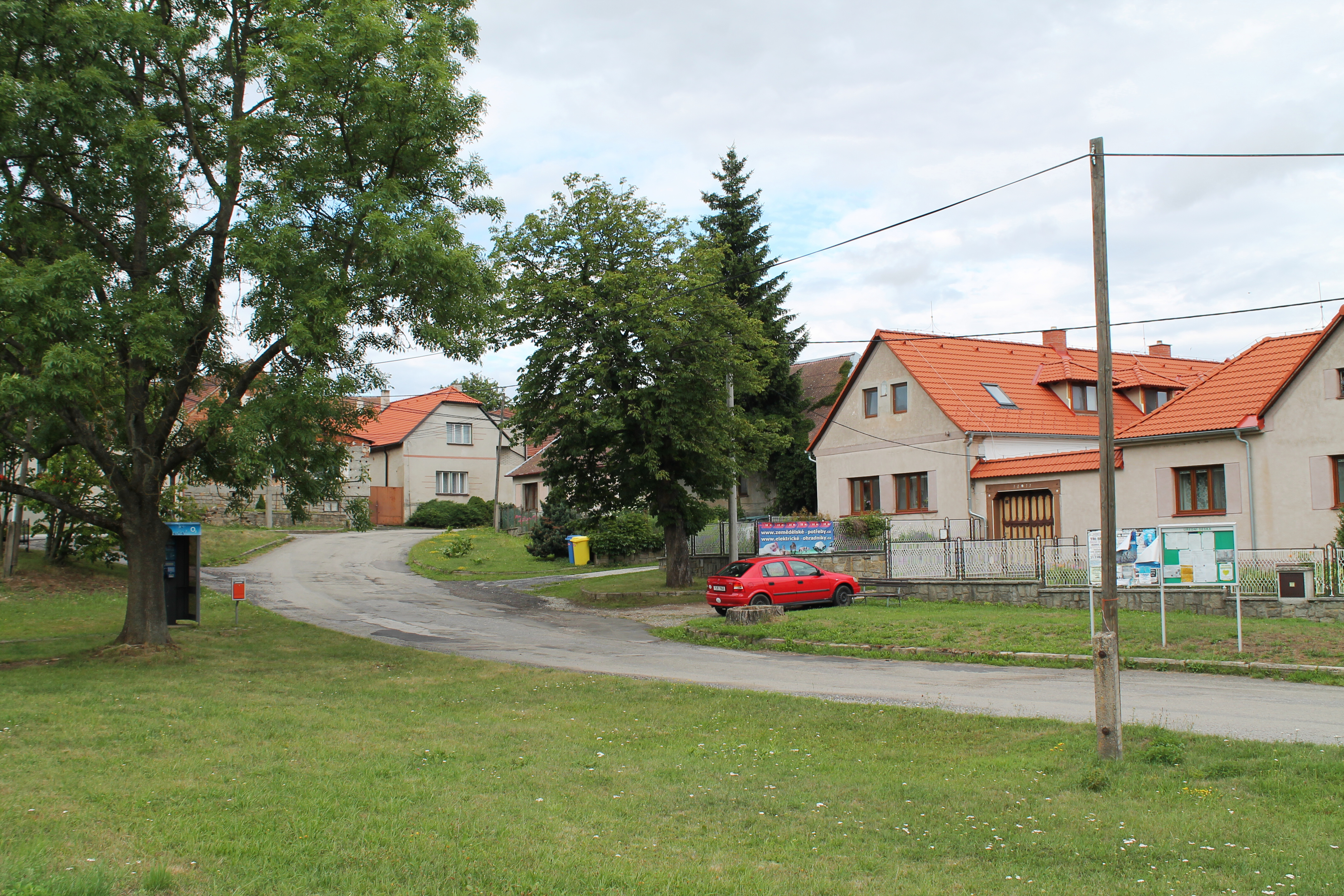
- Centre of Vystrčenovice

- Location in the Czech Republic
- Coordinates: 49°9′4″N 15°31′50″E
- Country: Czech Republic
- Region: Vysočina
- District: Jihlava
- First mentioned: 1436

Area
  - Total: 3.25 km^{2} (1.25 sq mi)
- Elevation: 558 m (1,831 ft)

Population (2026-01-01)
  - Total: 125
  - Density: 38.5/km^{2} (99.6/sq mi)
- Time zone: UTC+1 (CET)
  - Summer (DST): UTC+2 (CEST)
- Postal code: 588 56
- Website: www.vystrcenovice.cz

Vystrčenovice (Czech pronunciation: [ˈvɪstr̩tʃɛnovɪtsɛ]) is a municipality and village in Jihlava District in the Vysočina Region of the Czech Republic. It has about 100 inhabitants.

Vystrčenovice lies approximately 28 kilometres (17 mi) south of Jihlava and 132 km (82 mi) south-east of Prague.

== Demographics ==
Historical population
Year	Pop.	±%
1869	197	—
1880	197	+0.0%
1890	169	−14.2%
1900	175	+3.6%
1910	193	+10.3%
1921	189	−2.1%
1930	188	−0.5%
1950	142	−24.5%
1961	141	−0.7%
1970	146	+3.5%
1980	148	+1.4%
1991	133	−10.1%
2001	116	−12.8%
2011	100	−13.8%
2021	112	+12.0%
Source: Censuses
