= Třeštice =

- Municipality
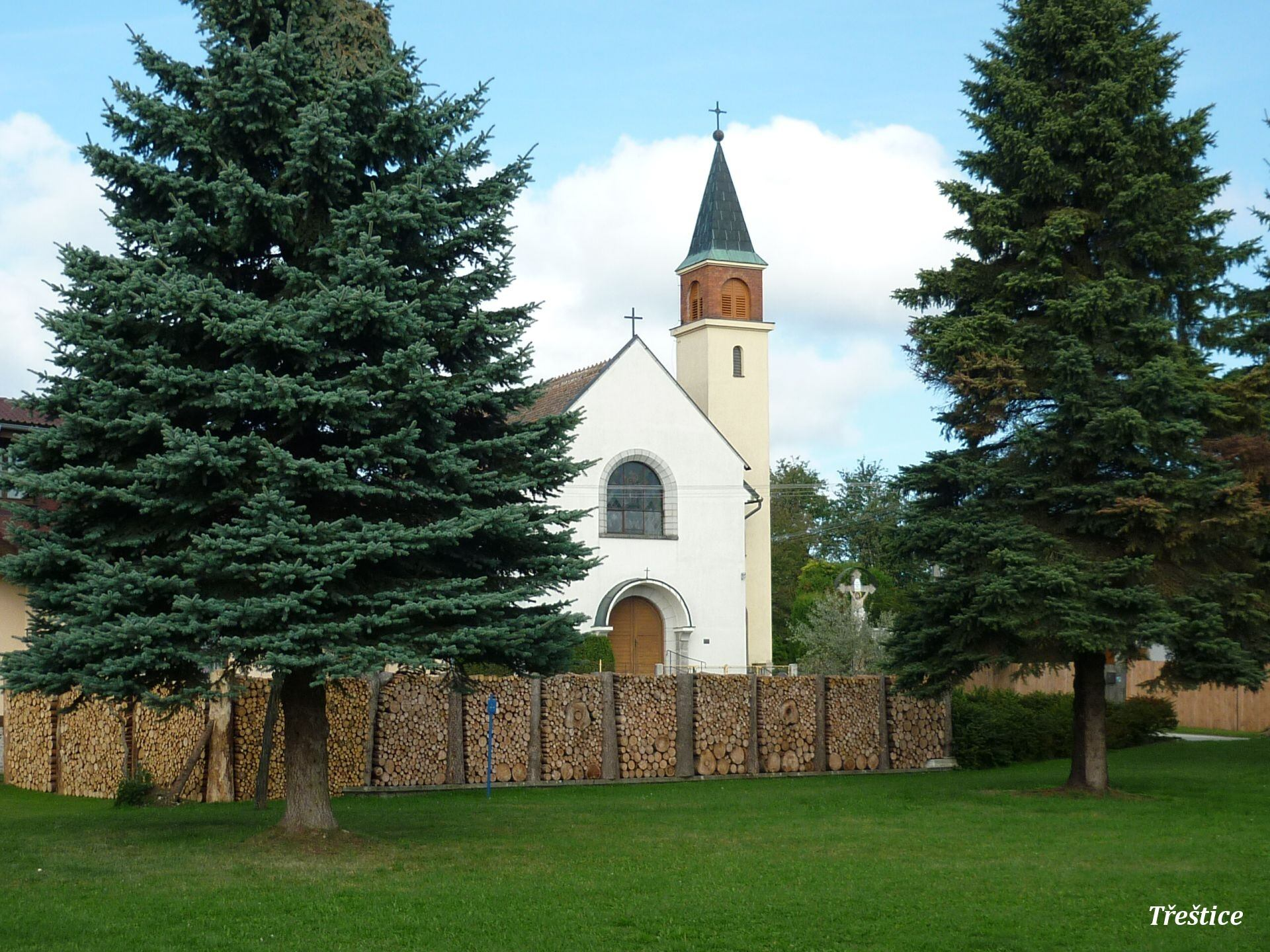
- Chapel of Saint Anthony of Padua

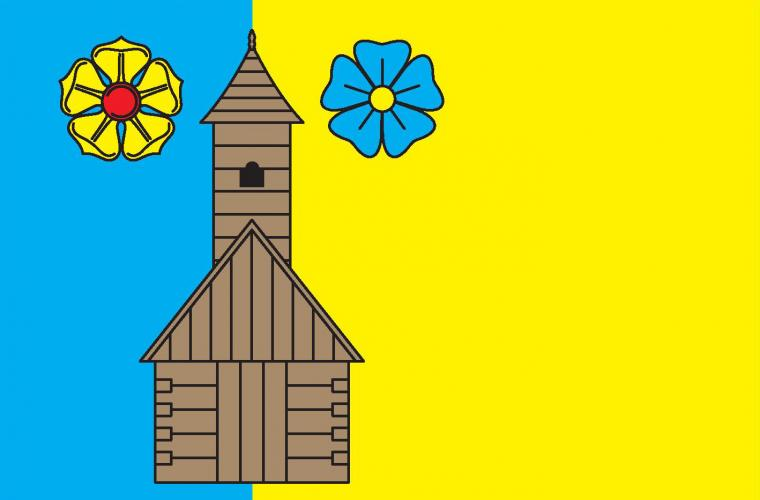
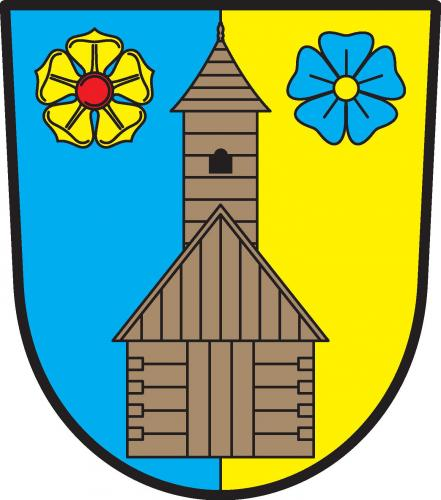
- Flag Coat of arms

- Location in the Czech Republic
- Coordinates: 49°14′44″N 15°27′12″E
- Country: Czech Republic
- Region: Vysočina
- District: Jihlava
- First mentioned: 1341

Area
  - Total: 7.02 km^{2} (2.71 sq mi)
- Elevation: 582 m (1,909 ft)

Population (2026-01-01)
  - Total: 158
  - Density: 22.5/km^{2} (58.3/sq mi)
- Time zone: UTC+1 (CET)
  - Summer (DST): UTC+2 (CEST)
- Postal code: 588 56
- Website: www.trestice.cz

Třeštice (Czech pronunciation: [ˈtr̝̊ɛʃcɪtsɛ]) is a municipality and village in Jihlava District in the Vysočina Region of the Czech Republic. It has about 200 inhabitants.

Třeštice lies approximately 19 kilometres (12 mi) south-west of Jihlava and 120 km (75 mi) south-east of Prague.

== Demographics ==
Historical population
Year	Pop.	±%
1869	282	—
1880	285	+1.1%
1890	296	+3.9%
1900	260	−12.2%
1910	292	+12.3%
1921	297	+1.7%
1930	262	−11.8%
1950	164	−37.4%
1961	163	−0.6%
1970	150	−8.0%
1980	126	−16.0%
1991	112	−11.1%
2001	114	+1.8%
2011	112	−1.8%
2021	156	+39.3%
Source: Censuses
