= Horní Myslová =

- Municipality
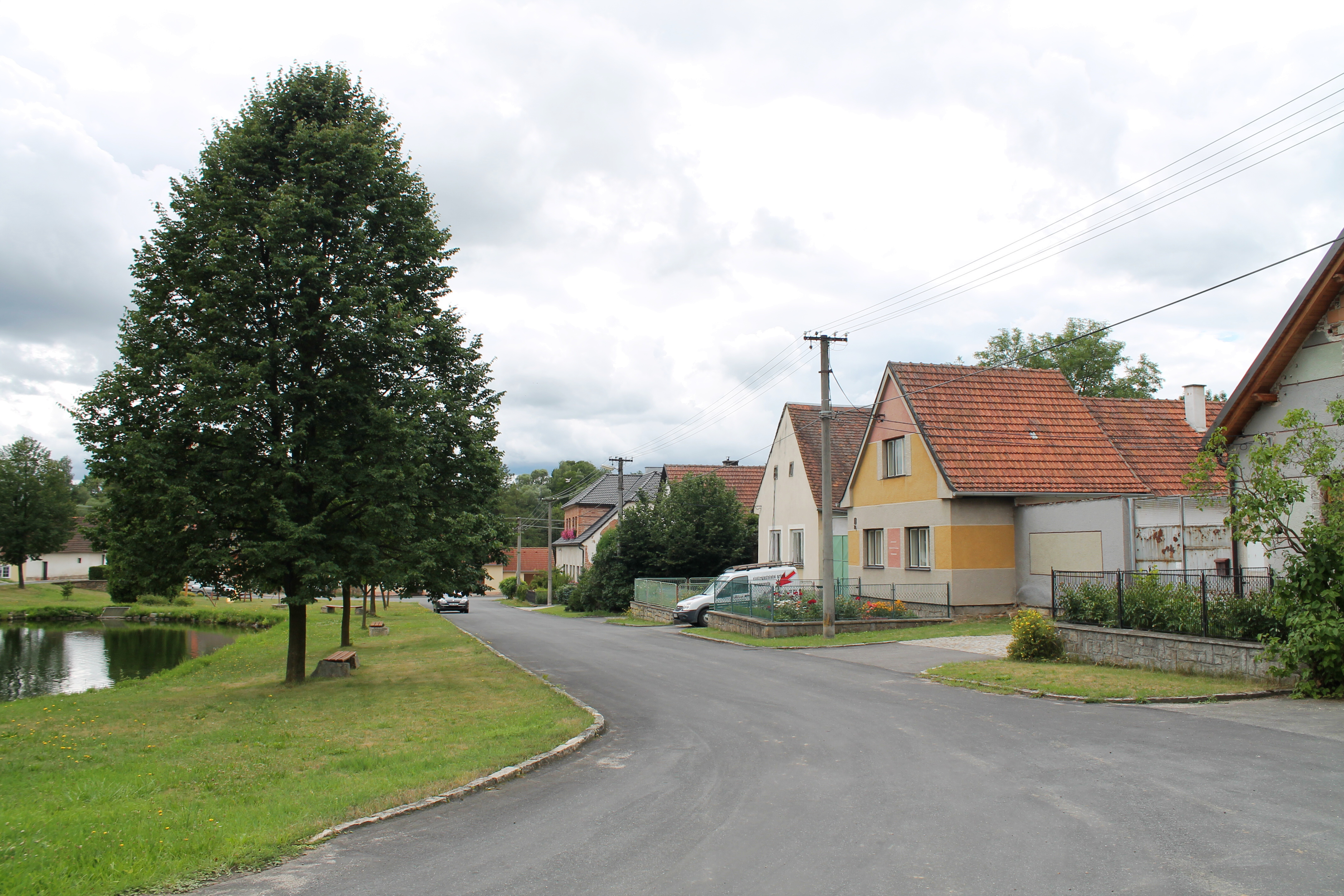
- Centre of Horní Myslová

- Location in the Czech Republic
- Coordinates: 49°9′56″N 15°25′21″E
- Country: Czech Republic
- Region: Vysočina
- District: Jihlava
- First mentioned: 1385

Area
  - Total: 3.64 km^{2} (1.41 sq mi)
- Elevation: 500 m (1,600 ft)

Population (2026-01-01)
  - Total: 91
  - Density: 25/km^{2} (65/sq mi)
- Time zone: UTC+1 (CET)
  - Summer (DST): UTC+2 (CEST)
- Postal codes: 588 56
- Website: www.hornimyslova.cz

Horní Myslová (Czech pronunciation: [ˈɦorɲiː ˈmɪslovaː]) is a municipality and village in Jihlava District in the Vysočina Region of the Czech Republic. It has about 90 inhabitants.

Horní Myslová lies approximately 29 kilometres (18 mi) south-west of Jihlava and 126 km (78 mi) south-east of Prague.

== Demographics ==
Historical population
Year	Pop.	±%
1869	193	—
1880	203	+5.2%
1890	198	−2.5%
1900	180	−9.1%
1910	154	−14.4%
1921	155	+0.6%
1930	184	+18.7%
1950	99	−46.2%
1961	113	+14.1%
1970	104	−8.0%
1980	99	−4.8%
1991	92	−7.1%
2001	87	−5.4%
2011	86	−1.1%
2021	88	+2.3%
Source: Censuses
