= Nevcehle =

- Municipality
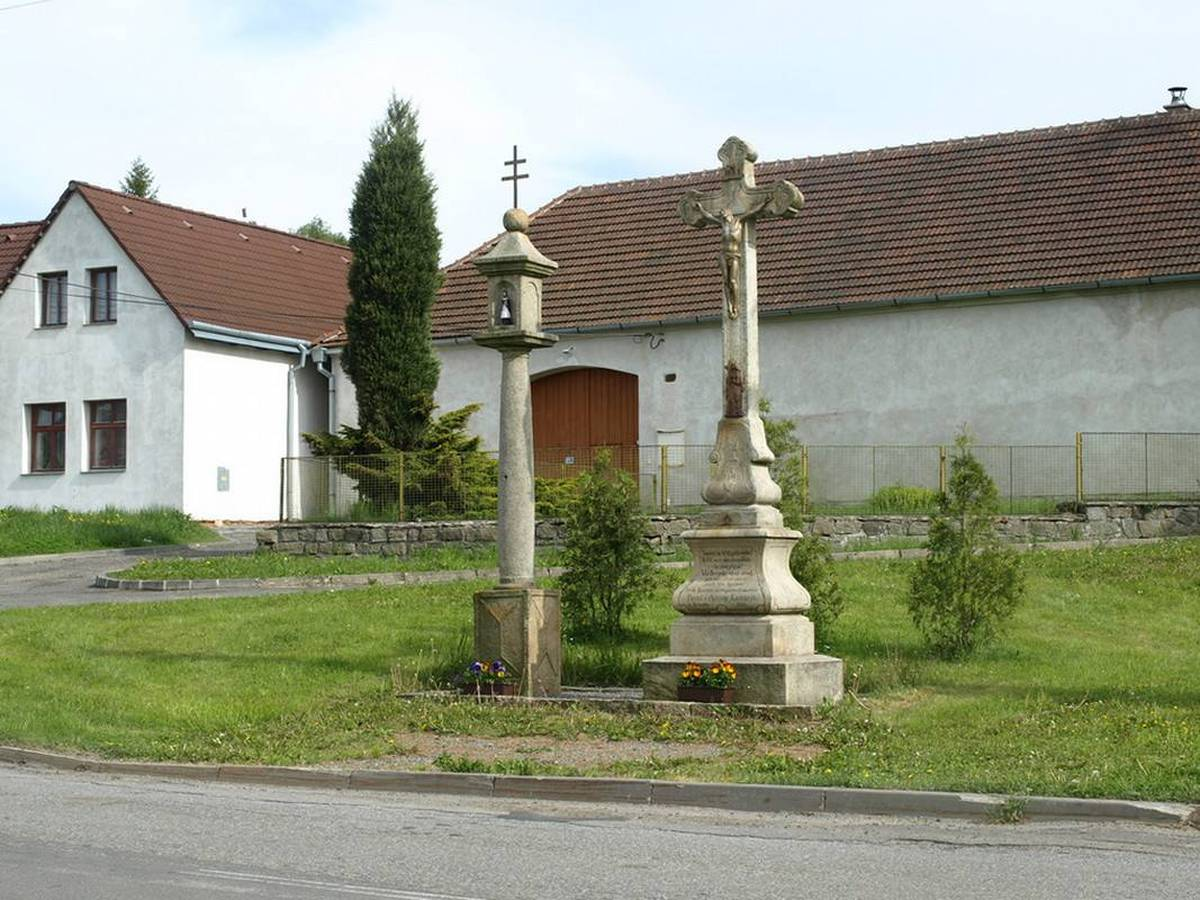
- Wayside shrine and cross

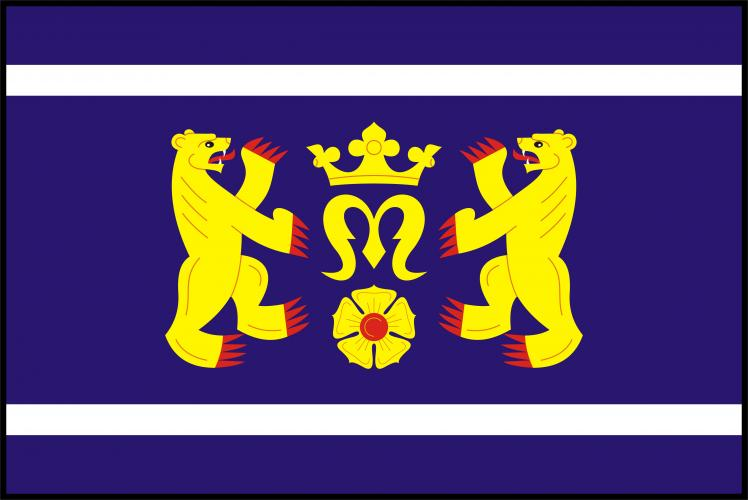
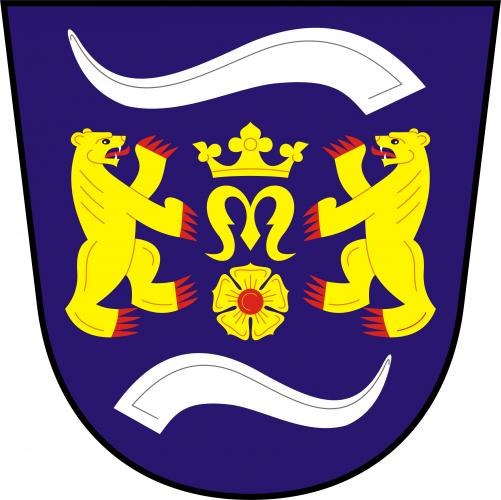
- Flag Coat of arms

- Location in the Czech Republic
- Coordinates: 49°13′33″N 15°32′4″E
- Country: Czech Republic
- Region: Vysočina
- District: Jihlava
- First mentioned: 1355

Area
  - Total: 7.83 km^{2} (3.02 sq mi)
- Elevation: 586 m (1,923 ft)

Population (2026-01-01)
  - Total: 227
  - Density: 29.0/km^{2} (75.1/sq mi)
- Time zone: UTC+1 (CET)
  - Summer (DST): UTC+2 (CEST)
- Postal code: 588 62
- Website: www.nevcehle-obec.cz

Nevcehle (Czech pronunciation: [ˈnɛftsɛɦlɛ]) is a municipality and village in Jihlava District in the Vysočina Region of the Czech Republic. It has about 200 inhabitants.

Nevcehle lies approximately 20 kilometres (12 mi) south of Jihlava and 125 km (78 mi) south-east of Prague.

== Demographics ==
Historical population
Year	Pop.	±%
1869	335	—
1880	364	+8.7%
1890	377	+3.6%
1900	360	−4.5%
1910	374	+3.9%
1921	374	+0.0%
1930	368	−1.6%
1950	326	−11.4%
1961	301	−7.7%
1970	282	−6.3%
1980	265	−6.0%
1991	259	−2.3%
2001	248	−4.2%
2011	221	−10.9%
2021	225	+1.8%
Source: Censuses
