= Jersín =

- Municipality
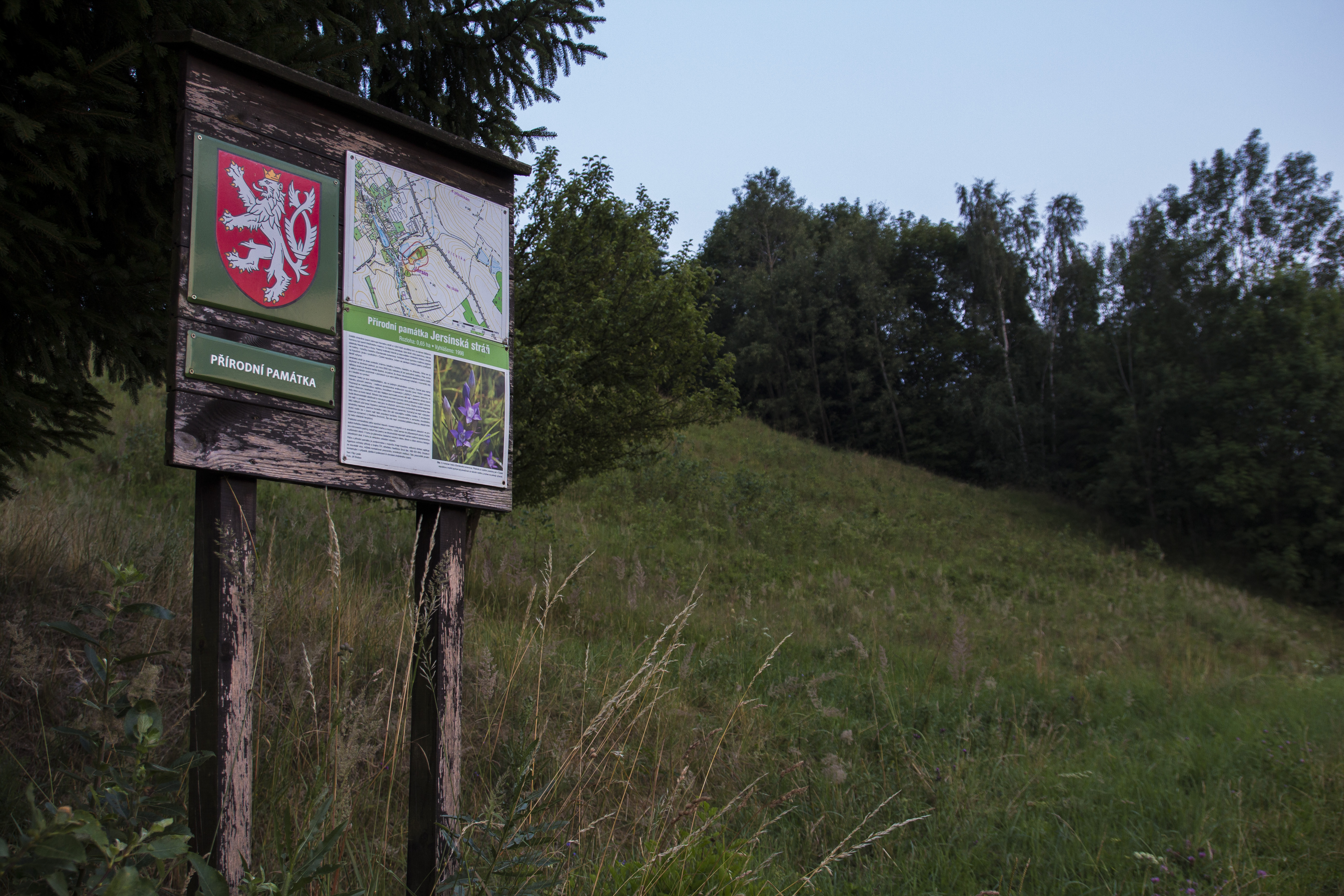
- Jersínská stráň Nature Monument

- Location in the Czech Republic
- Coordinates: 49°25′17″N 15°49′51″E
- Country: Czech Republic
- Region: Vysočina
- District: Jihlava
- First mentioned: 1453

Area
  - Total: 5.95 km^{2} (2.30 sq mi)
- Elevation: 520 m (1,710 ft)

Population (2026-01-01)
  - Total: 197
  - Density: 33.1/km^{2} (85.8/sq mi)
- Time zone: UTC+1 (CET)
  - Summer (DST): UTC+2 (CEST)
- Postal code: 588 25
- Website: www.jersin.cz

Jersín (Czech pronunciation: [ˈjɛrsiːn]) is a municipality and village in Jihlava District in the Vysočina Region of the Czech Republic. It has about 200 inhabitants.

Jersín lies approximately 18 kilometres (11 mi) east of Jihlava and 125 km (78 mi) south-east of Prague.

== Demographics ==
Historical population
Year	Pop.	±%
1869	320	—
1880	357	+11.6%
1890	348	−2.5%
1900	327	−6.0%
1910	316	−3.4%
1921	323	+2.2%
1930	349	+8.0%
1950	288	−17.5%
1961	273	−5.2%
1970	265	−2.9%
1980	233	−12.1%
1991	206	−11.6%
2001	197	−4.4%
2011	189	−4.1%
2021	167	−11.6%
Source: Censuses
