= Řídelov =

- Municipality
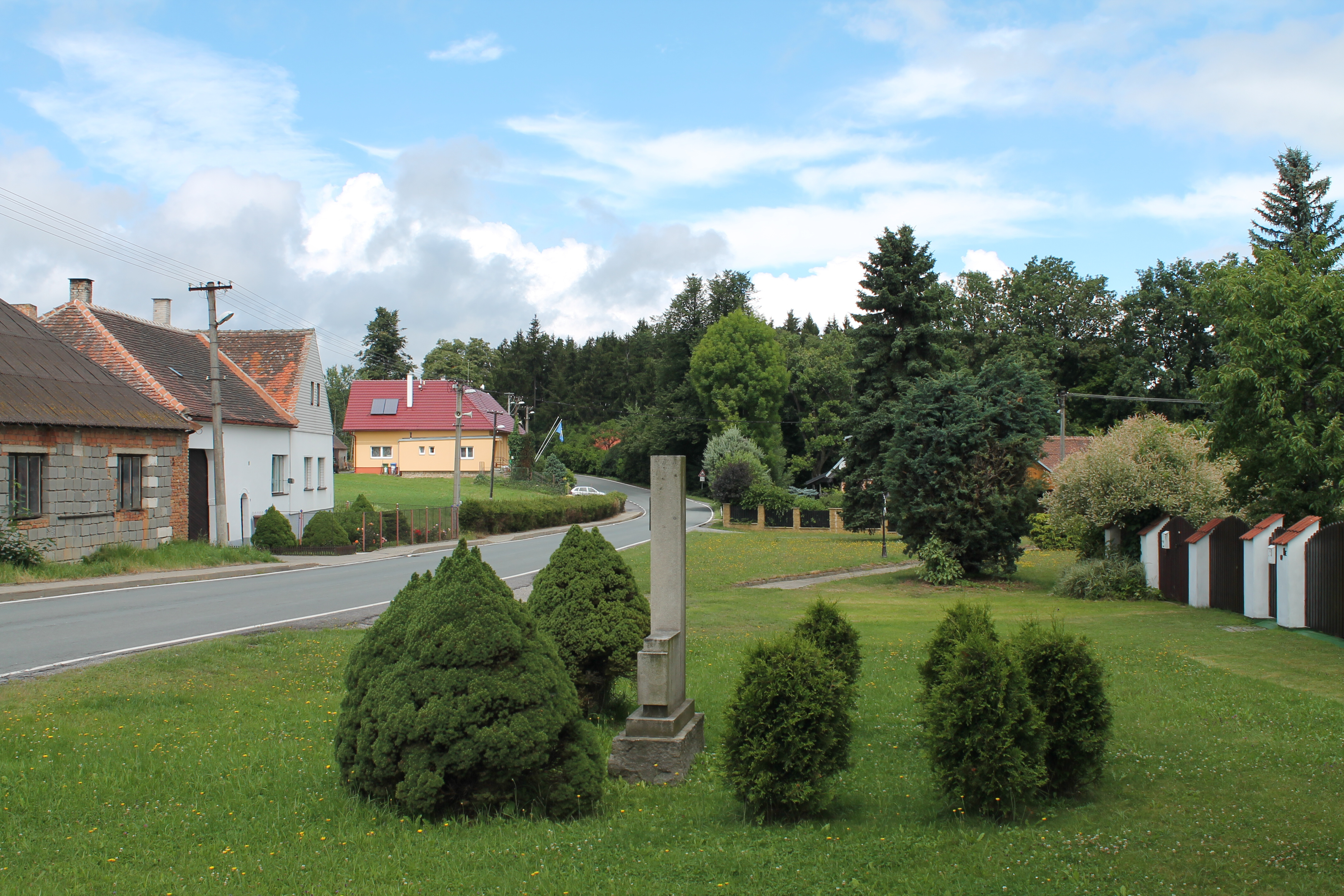
- Centre of Řídelov

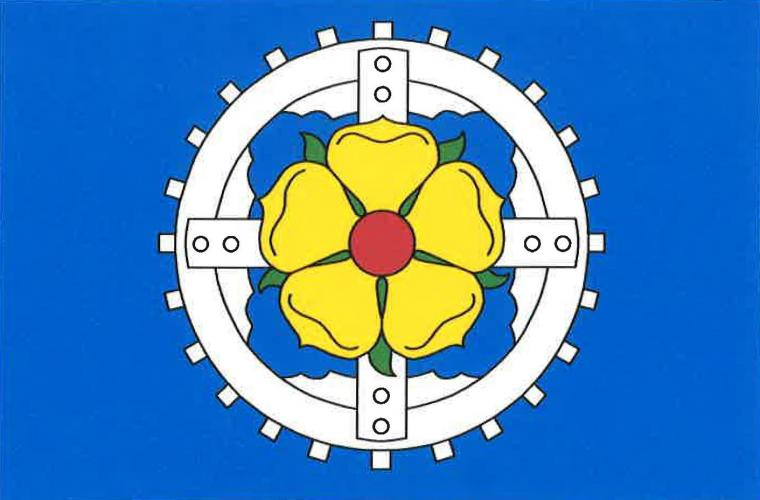
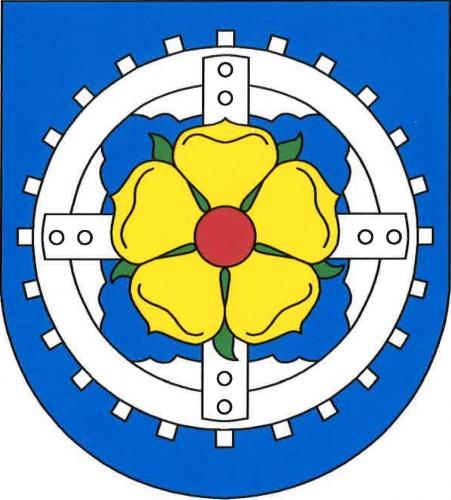
- Flag Coat of arms

- Location in the Czech Republic
- Coordinates: 49°14′4″N 15°24′25″E
- Country: Czech Republic
- Region: Vysočina
- District: Jihlava
- First mentioned: 1355

Area
  - Total: 6.53 km^{2} (2.52 sq mi)
- Elevation: 633 m (2,077 ft)

Population (2026-01-01)
  - Total: 92
  - Density: 14/km^{2} (36/sq mi)
- Time zone: UTC+1 (CET)
  - Summer (DST): UTC+2 (CEST)
- Postal codes: 588 56
- Website: www.ridelov.cz

Řídelov (Czech pronunciation: [ˈr̝iːdɛlof]) is a municipality and village in Jihlava District in the Vysočina Region of the Czech Republic. It has about 90 inhabitants.

Řídelov lies approximately 22 kilometres (14 mi) south-west of Jihlava and 118 km (73 mi) south-east of Prague.

== Demographics ==
Historical population
Year	Pop.	±%
1869	179	—
1880	193	+7.8%
1890	201	+4.1%
1900	199	−1.0%
1910	159	−20.1%
1921	175	+10.1%
1930	174	−0.6%
1950	167	−4.0%
1961	171	+2.4%
1970	149	−12.9%
1980	113	−24.2%
1991	91	−19.5%
2001	87	−4.4%
2011	83	−4.6%
2021	86	+3.6%
Source: Censuses
