= Nadějov =

- Municipality
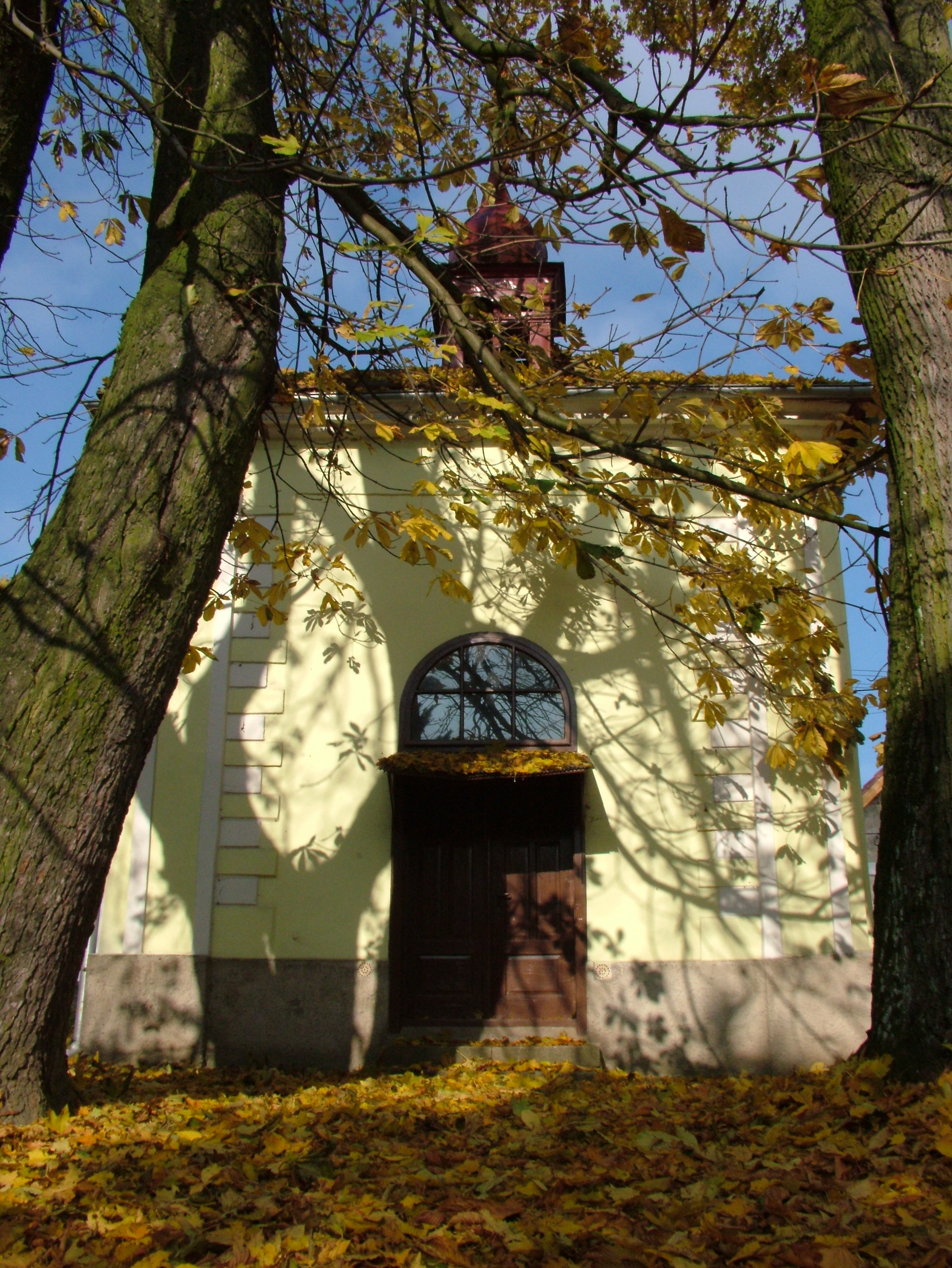
- Chapel of Saint Florian

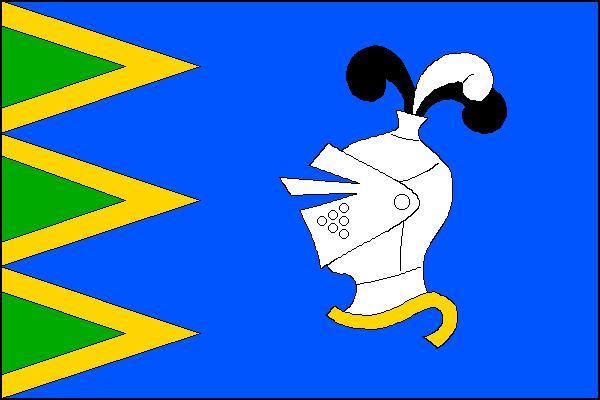
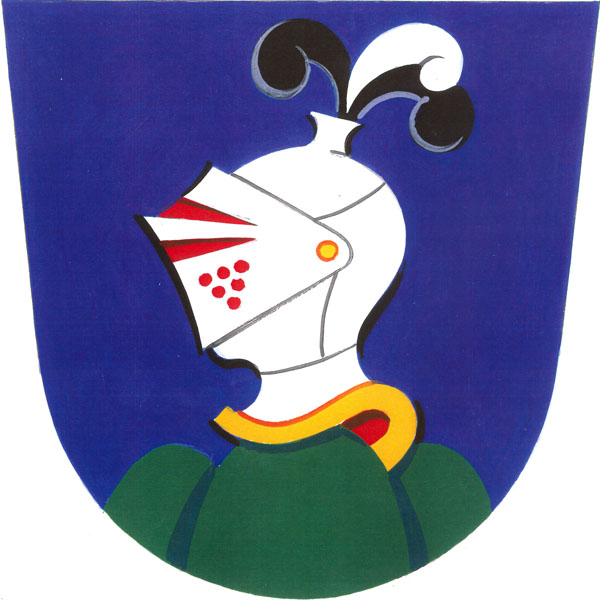
- Flag Coat of arms

- Location in the Czech Republic
- Coordinates: 49°25′20″N 15°46′23″E
- Country: Czech Republic
- Region: Vysočina
- District: Jihlava
- First mentioned: 1298

Area
  - Total: 6.17 km^{2} (2.38 sq mi)
- Elevation: 584 m (1,916 ft)

Population (2026-01-01)
  - Total: 189
  - Density: 30.6/km^{2} (79.3/sq mi)
- Time zone: UTC+1 (CET)
  - Summer (DST): UTC+2 (CEST)
- Postal code: 588 27
- Website: www.nadejov.cz

Nadějov (Czech pronunciation: [ˈnaɟɛjof]) is a municipality and village in Jihlava District in the Vysočina Region of the Czech Republic. It has about 200 inhabitants.

Nadějov lies approximately 14 kilometres (9 mi) east of Jihlava and 123 km (76 mi) south-east of Prague.

== Demographics ==
Historical population
Year	Pop.	±%
1869	317	—
1880	378	+19.2%
1890	364	−3.7%
1900	350	−3.8%
1910	341	−2.6%
1921	356	+4.4%
1930	338	−5.1%
1950	250	−26.0%
1961	225	−10.0%
1970	178	−20.9%
1980	212	+19.1%
1991	229	+8.0%
2001	208	−9.2%
2011	199	−4.3%
2021	192	−3.5%
Source: Censuses
