= Brtnička =

- Municipality
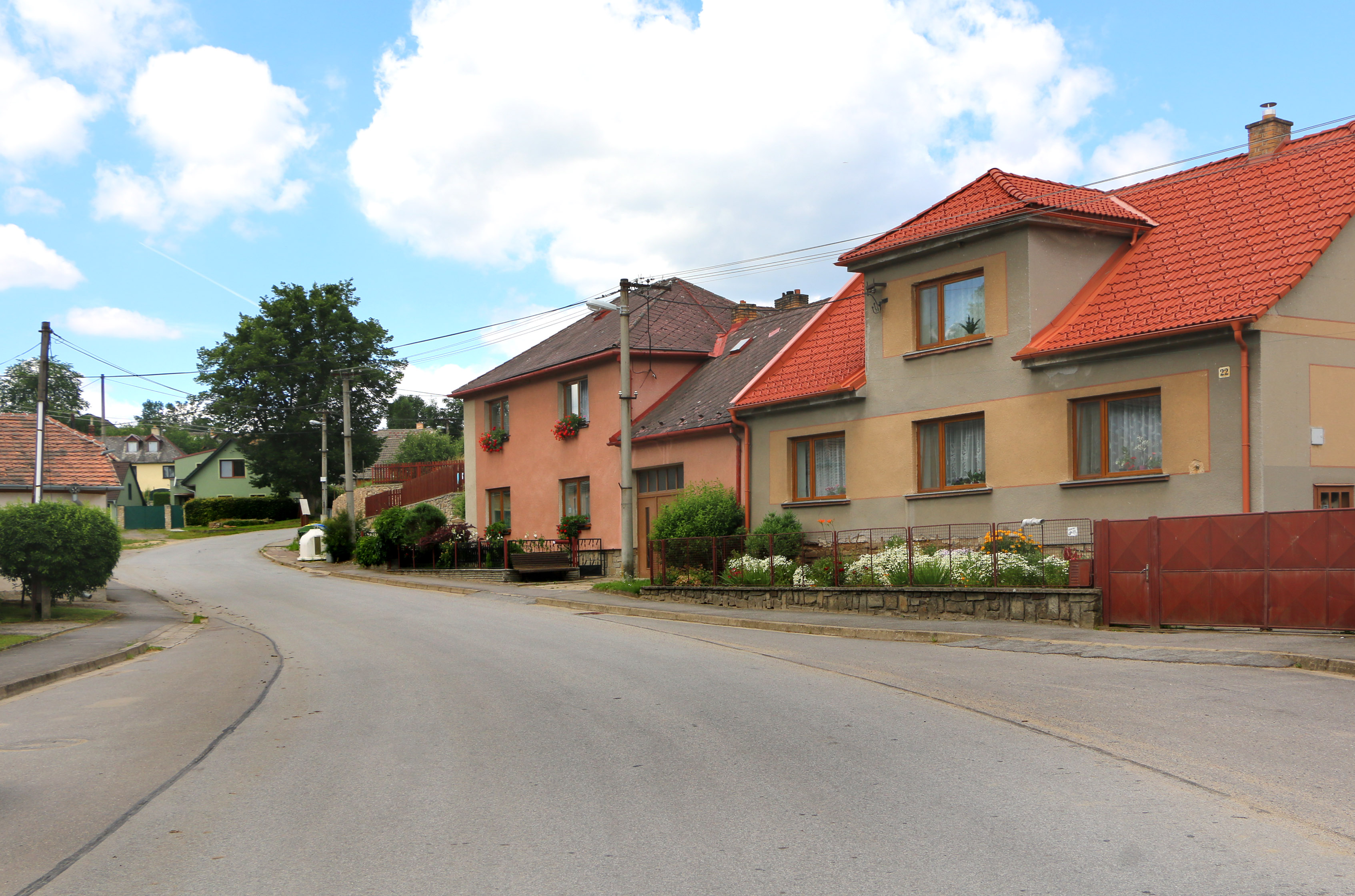
- Main street

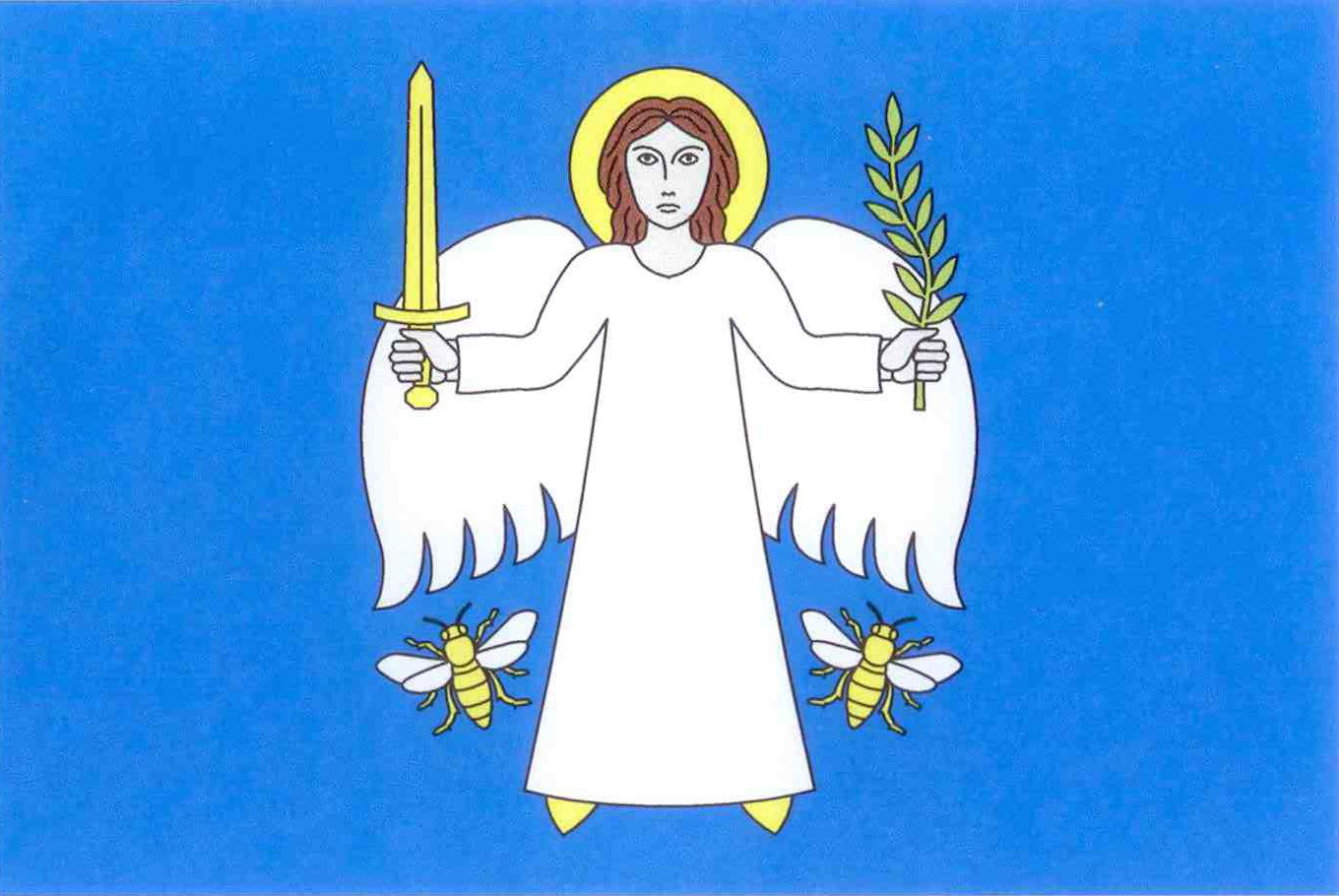
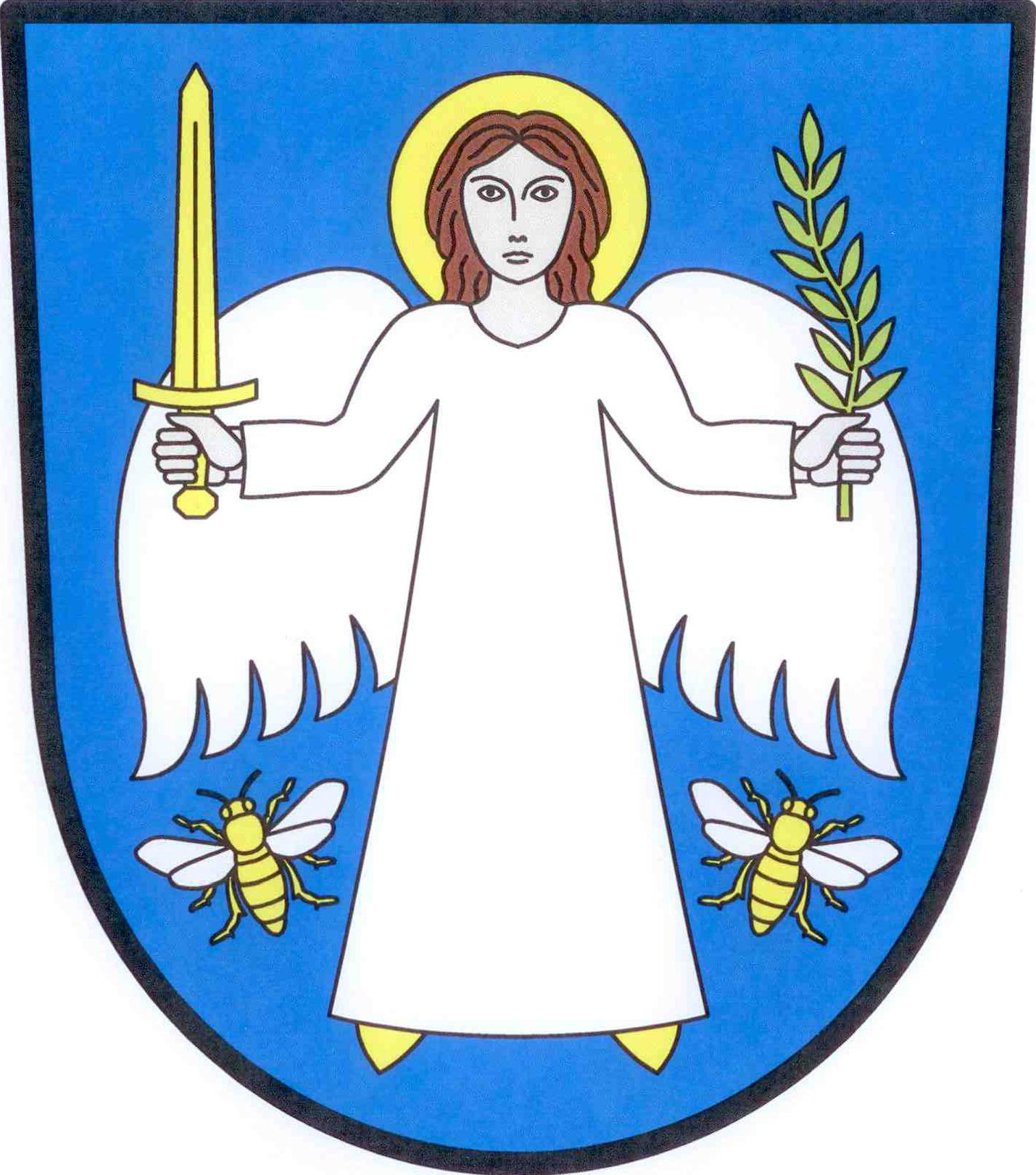
- Flag Coat of arms

- Location in the Czech Republic
- Coordinates: 49°14′14″N 15°37′27″E
- Country: Czech Republic
- Region: Vysočina
- District: Jihlava
- First mentioned: 1089

Area
  - Total: 3.10 km^{2} (1.20 sq mi)
- Elevation: 597 m (1,959 ft)

Population (2026-01-01)
  - Total: 97
  - Density: 31/km^{2} (81/sq mi)
- Time zone: UTC+1 (CET)
  - Summer (DST): UTC+2 (CEST)
- Postal code: 675 27
- Website: www.obecbrtnicka.cz

Brtnička (Czech pronunciation: [ˈbr̩tɲɪtʃka]) is a municipality and village in Jihlava District in the Vysočina Region of the Czech Republic. It has about 100 inhabitants.

Brtnička lies approximately 19 kilometres (12 mi) south of Jihlava and 129 km (80 mi) south-east of Prague.

== Demographics ==
Historical population
Year	Pop.	±%
1869	302	—
1880	317	+5.0%
1890	272	−14.2%
1900	275	+1.1%
1910	263	−4.4%
1921	283	+7.6%
1930	264	−6.7%
1950	223	−15.5%
1961	218	−2.2%
1970	177	−18.8%
1980	151	−14.7%
1991	141	−6.6%
2001	119	−15.6%
2011	107	−10.1%
2021	97	−9.3%
Source: Censuses
