= Mysletice =

- Municipality
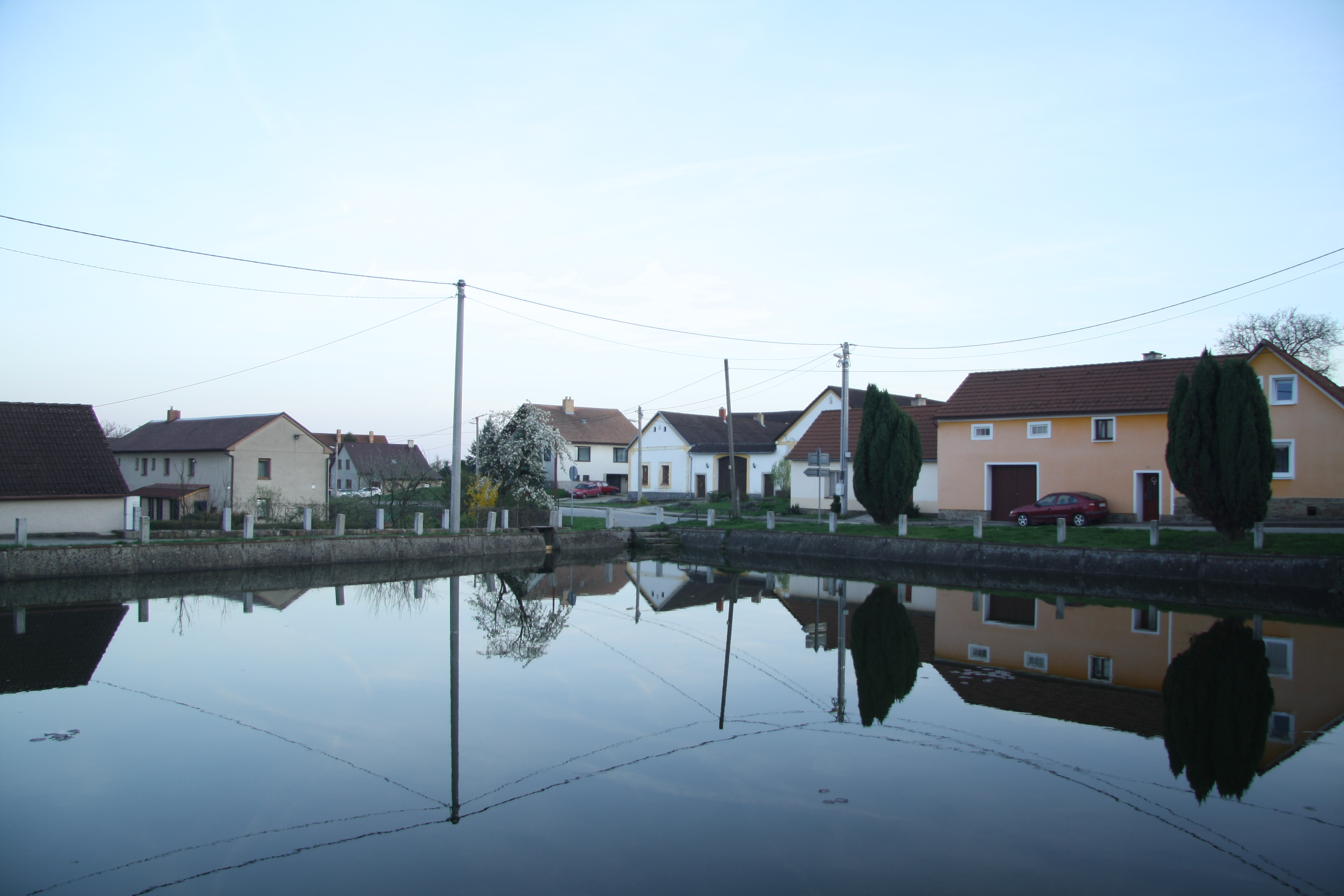
- Reservoir in the centre of Mysletice

- Location in the Czech Republic
- Coordinates: 49°8′33″N 15°23′22″E
- Country: Czech Republic
- Region: Vysočina
- District: Jihlava
- First mentioned: 1378

Area
  - Total: 2.92 km^{2} (1.13 sq mi)
- Elevation: 570 m (1,870 ft)

Population (2026-01-01)
  - Total: 131
  - Density: 44.9/km^{2} (116/sq mi)
- Time zone: UTC+1 (CET)
  - Summer (DST): UTC+2 (CEST)
- Postal code: 588 56
- Website: www.obecmysletice.cz

Mysletice (Czech pronunciation: [ˈmɪslɛcɪtsɛ]) is a municipality and village in Jihlava District in the Vysočina Region of the Czech Republic. It has about 100 inhabitants.

Mysletice lies approximately 32 kilometres (20 mi) south-west of Jihlava and 126 km (78 mi) south-east of Prague.

== Demographics ==
Historical population
Year	Pop.	±%
1869	183	—
1880	159	−13.1%
1890	165	+3.8%
1900	177	+7.3%
1910	184	+4.0%
1921	183	−0.5%
1930	168	−8.2%
1950	135	−19.6%
1961	122	−9.6%
1970	114	−6.6%
1980	149	+30.7%
1991	120	−19.5%
2001	128	+6.7%
2011	122	−4.7%
2021	118	−3.3%
Source: Censuses
