= Jihlava District =

Jihlava District Okres Jihlava
- District
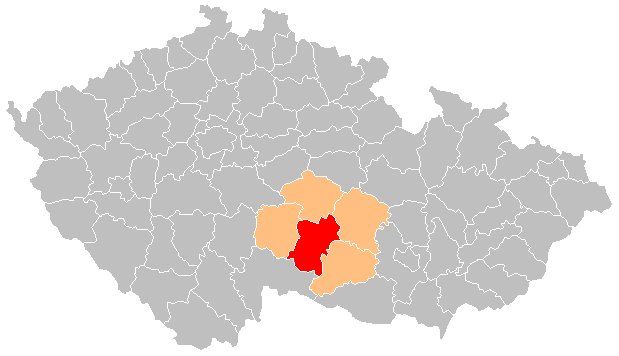
- Location in the Vysočina Region within the Czech Republic
- Coordinates: 49°21′N 15°32′E
- Country: Czech Republic
- Region: Vysočina
- Capital: Jihlava

Area
  - Total: 1,199.25 km^{2} (463.03 sq mi)

Population (2026)
  - Total: 117,418
  - Density: 97.9095/km^{2} (253.585/sq mi)
- Time zone: UTC+1 (CET)
  - Summer (DST): UTC+2 (CEST)
- Municipalities: 123
- * Cities and towns: 5
- * Market towns: 9

Jihlava District (Czech: okres Jihlava) is a district in the Vysočina Region of the Czech Republic. Its capital is the city of Jihlava.

== Administrative division ==
Jihlava District is divided into two administrative districts of municipalities with extended competence: Jihlava and Telč.

=== List of municipalities ===
Cities and towns are marked in bold and market towns in italics:

Arnolec – Batelov – Bílý Kámen – Bítovčice – Bohuslavice – Borovná – Boršov – Brtnice – Brtnička – Brzkov – Cejle – Cerekvička-Rosice – Černíč – Čížov – Dlouhá Brtnice – Dobronín – Dobroutov – Dolní Cerekev – Dolní Vilímeč – Doupě – Dudín – Dušejov – Dvorce – Dyjice – Hladov – Hodice – Hojkov – Horní Dubenky – Horní Myslová – Hostětice – Hrutov – Hubenov – Hybrálec – Jamné – Jersín – Jezdovice – Ježená – Jihlava – Jihlávka – Jindřichovice – Kalhov – Kaliště – Kamenice – Kamenná – Klatovec – Kněžice – Knínice – Kostelec – Kostelní Myslová – Kozlov – Krahulčí – Krasonice – Lhotka – Luka nad Jihlavou – Malý Beranov – Markvartice – Měšín – Milíčov – Mirošov – Mrákotín – Mysletice – Mysliboř – Nadějov – Nevcehle – Nová Říše – Olšany – Olší – Opatov – Ořechov – Otín – Panenská Rozsíčka – Panské Dubenky – Pavlov – Plandry – Polná – Puklice – Radkov – Rančířov – Rantířov – Řásná – Řídelov – Rohozná – Rozseč – Růžená – Rybné – Sedlatice – Sedlejov – Šimanov – Smrčná – Stáj – Stará Říše – Stonařov – Strachoňovice – Střítež – Suchá – Švábov – Svojkovice – Telč – Třešť – Třeštice – Urbanov – Ústí – Vanov – Vanůvek – Vápovice – Velký Beranov – Větrný Jeníkov – Věžnice – Věžnička – Vílanec – Volevčice – Vyskytná nad Jihlavou – Vysoké Studnice – Vystrčenovice – Záborná – Zadní Vydří – Žatec – Zbilidy – Zbinohy – Zdeňkov – Ždírec – Zhoř – Zvolenovice

== Geography ==
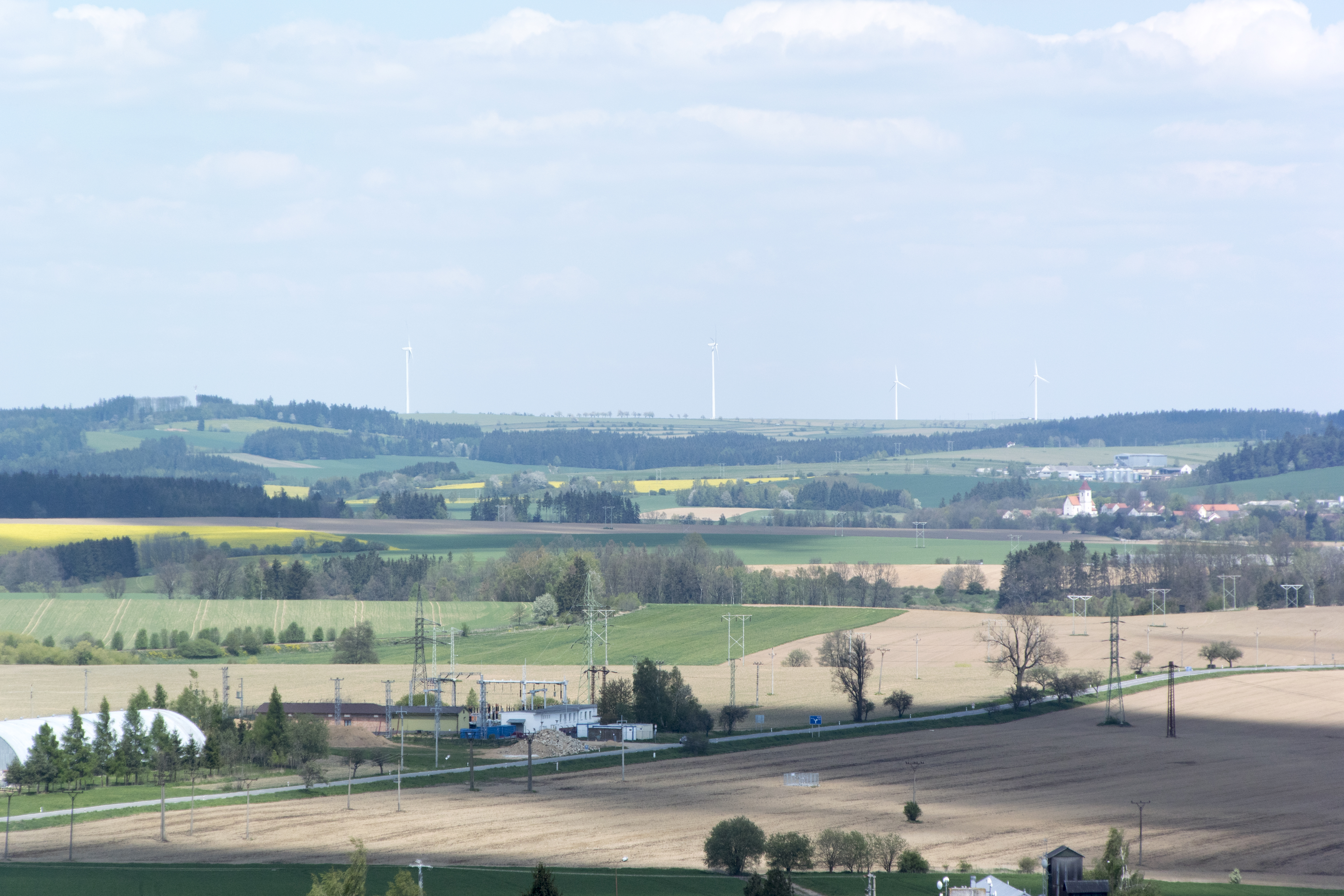
Landscape east of Telč

The landscape is very rugged, with an average altitude of around 540 m (1,770 ft). The climate of the district is harsh and cold for most of the year. The territory extends into five geomorphological mesoregions: Křižanov Highlands (most of the territory), Upper Sázava Hills (north), Křemešník Highlands (northwest), Javořice Highlands (southwest) and Jevišovice Uplands (small parts in the southeast). The highest point of the district and of the whole Vysočina Region is the mountain Javořice in Mrákotín with an elevation of 837 m (2,746 ft), the lowest point is the river bed of the Jihlava River in Brtnice at 422 m (1,385 ft).

From the total district area of 1,199.3 km^{2} (463.1 sq mi), agricultural land occupies 700.5 km^{2} (270.5 sq mi), forests occupy 375.3 km^{2} (144.9 sq mi), and water area occupies 21.3 km^{2} (8.2 sq mi). Forests cover 31.3% of the district's area.

The most important river is the Jihlava, which flows across the district from west to east. Southern part of the district is drained by the Moravian Thaya. The largest bodies of water are the reservoirs Nová Říše and Hubenov, there are also many ponds.

There are no protected landscape areas, only small-scale protected areas.

== Demographics ==
Historical population

Year	Pop.	±%
1869	99,709	—
1880	105,142	+5.4%
1890	107,738	+2.5%
1900	108,298	+0.5%
1910	111,175	+2.7%

Year	Pop.	±%
1921	110,102	−1.0%
1930	112,378	+2.1%
1950	92,940	−17.3%
1961	101,163	+8.8%
1970	102,865	+1.7%

Year	Pop.	±%
1980	108,869	+5.8%
1991	109,883	+0.9%
2001	109,856	−0.0%
2011	110,522	+0.6%
2021	111,324	+0.7%

Source: Censuses

=== Most populous municipalities ===
Name	Population	Area (km^{2})
Jihlava	53,686	88
Třešť	5,801	47
Polná	5,305	38
Telč	5,105	25
Brtnice	3,870	74
Luka nad Jihlavou	3,184	16
Batelov	2,458	43
Kamenice	1,973	34
Dobronín	1,851	14
Kněžice	1,386	22

== Economy ==
The largest employers with headquarters in Jihlava District and at least 1,000 employees are:

Economic entity	Location	Number of employees	Main activity
Bosch Powertrain	Jihlava	4,000–4,999	Manufacture of parts for motor vehicles
Jihlava Hospital	Jihlava	2,000–2,499	Health care
Marelli Automotive Lighting Jihlava	Jihlava	1,500–1,999	Manufacture of automotive lighting
Regional Police Directorate of the Vysočina Region	Jihlava	1,500–1,999	Public order and safety activities
Kostelecké uzeniny	Kostelec	1,000–1,499	Food industry

== Transport ==
The D1 motorway from Prague to Brno passes through the northern part of the district.

== Sights ==
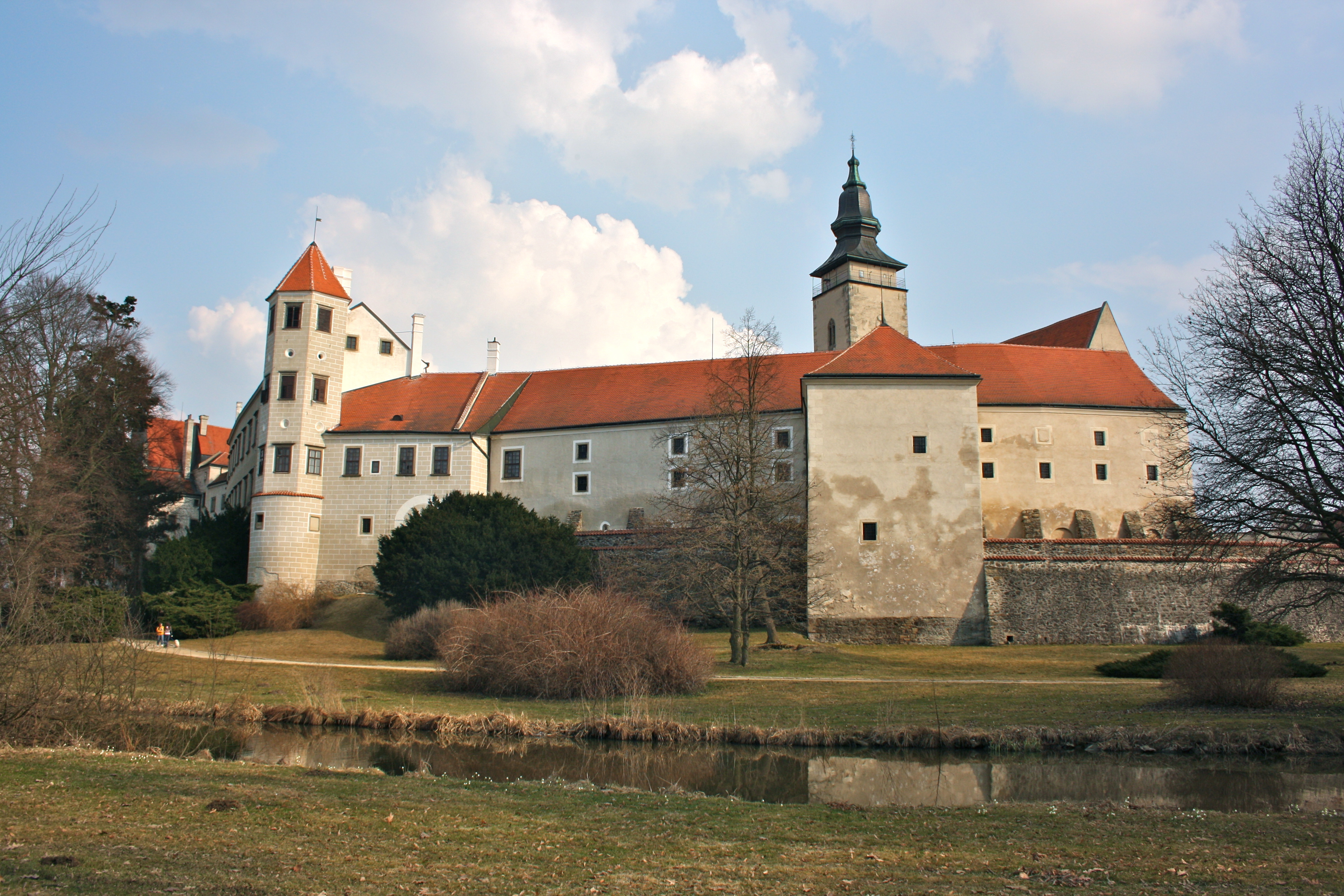
Telč Castle

The historic centre of Telč was designated a UNESCO World Heritage Site in 1992 because of its outstanding nature and architectural value.

The most important monuments in the district, protected as national cultural monuments, are:

- Telč Castle
- Church of Saint James the Great in Jihlava
- Church of the Assumption of the Virgin Mary in Polná

The best-preserved settlements, protected as monument reservations and monument zones, are:

- Jihlava (monument reservation)
- Telč (monument reservation)
- Brtnice
- Polná
- Telč-Staré Město
- Třešť
- Praskolesy

The most visited tourist destinations are the Jihlava Zoo, Jihlava water park, Roštejn Castle in Doupě, and Jihlava family park Robinson.
