= Klatovec =

- Municipality
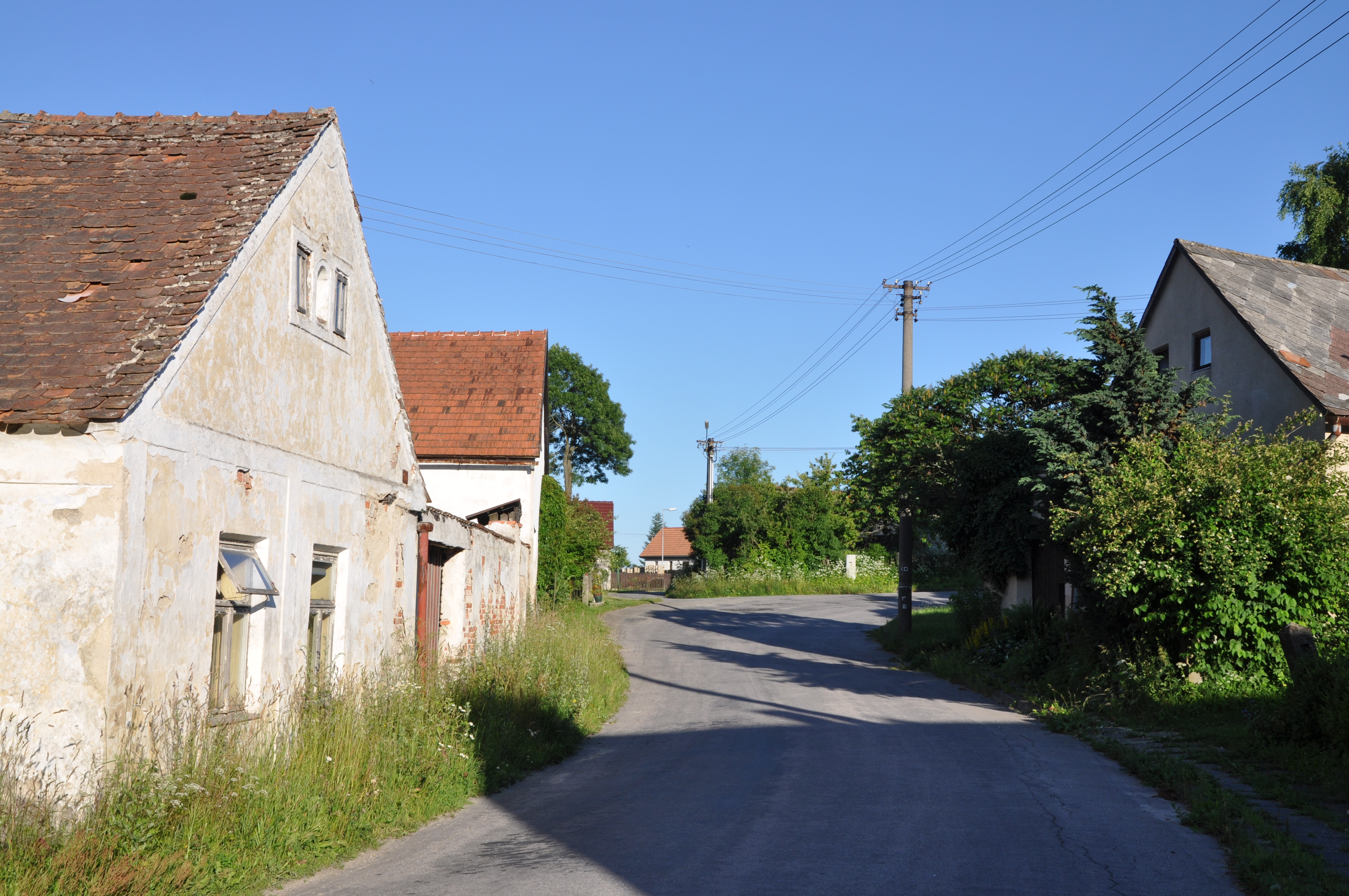
- Main street

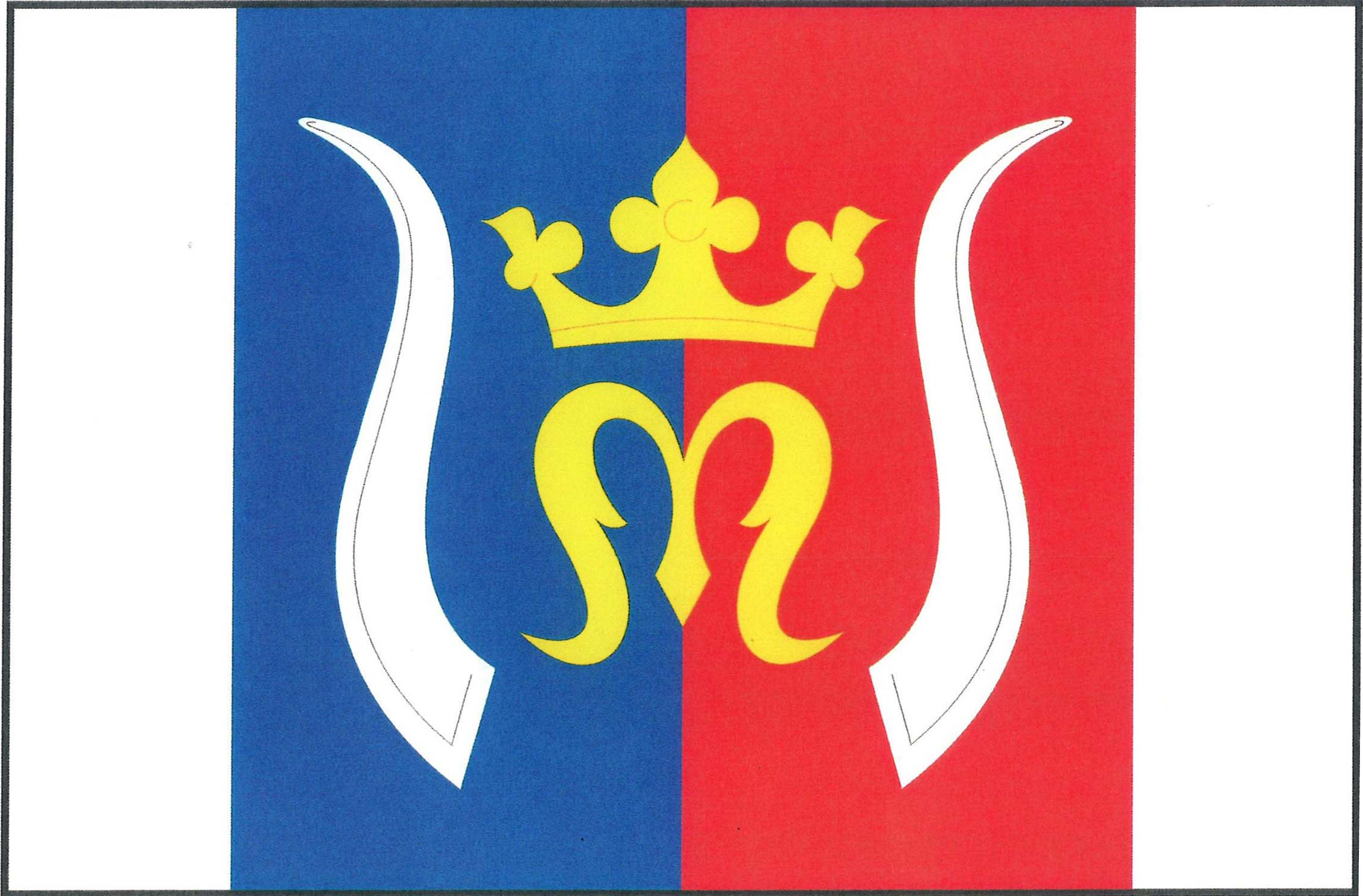
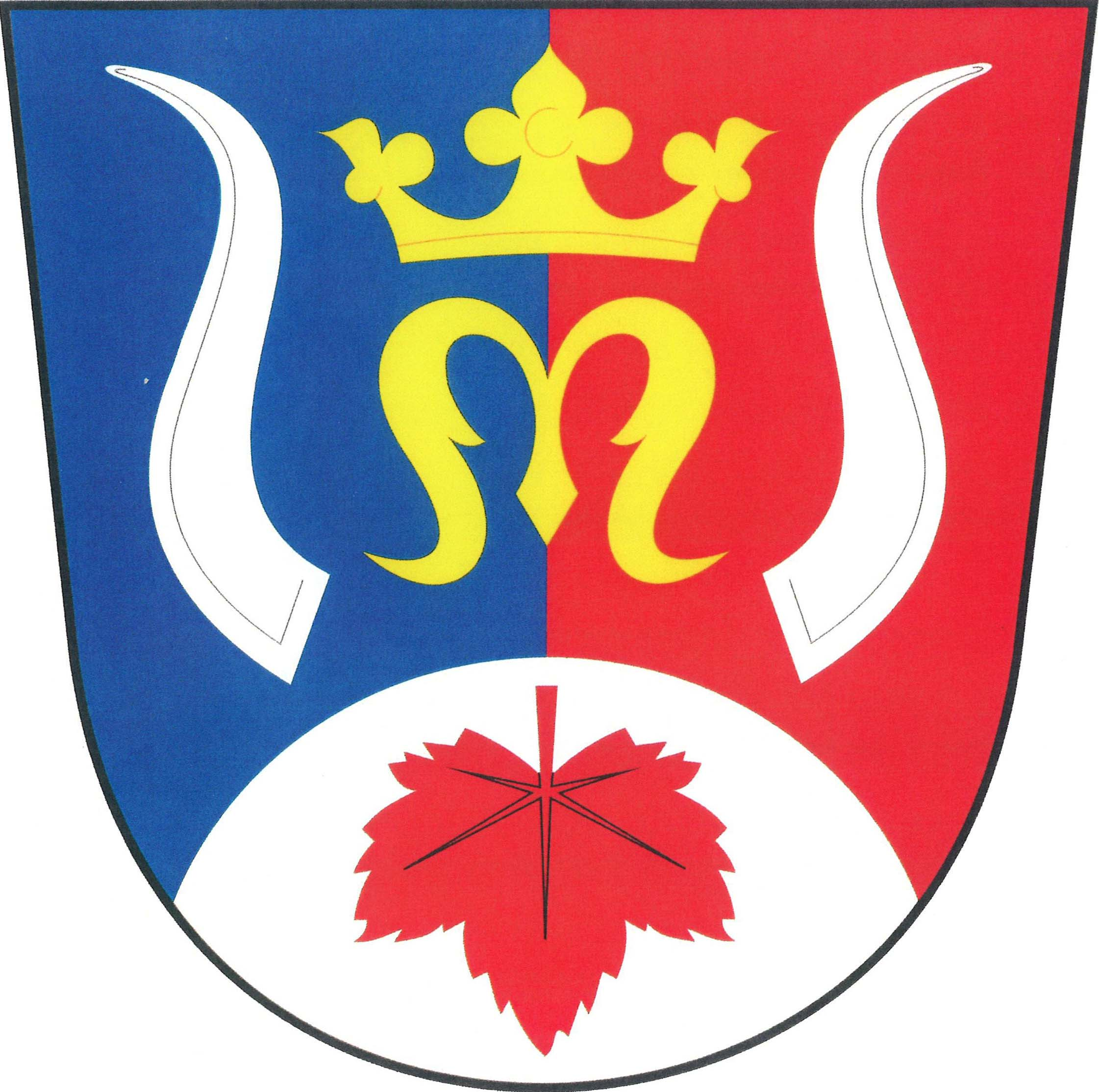
- Flag Coat of arms

- Location in the Czech Republic
- Coordinates: 49°13′21″N 15°17′41″E
- Country: Czech Republic
- Region: Vysočina
- District: Jihlava
- First mentioned: 1386

Area
  - Total: 6.58 km^{2} (2.54 sq mi)
- Elevation: 704 m (2,310 ft)

Population (2026-01-01)
  - Total: 75
  - Density: 11/km^{2} (30/sq mi)
- Time zone: UTC+1 (CET)
  - Summer (DST): UTC+2 (CEST)
- Postal code: 588 51
- Website: www.klatovec.cz

Klatovec (Czech pronunciation: [ˈklatovɛts]) is a municipality and village in Jihlava District in the Vysočina Region of the Czech Republic. It has about 80 inhabitants.

Klatovec lies approximately 28 kilometres (17 mi) south-west of Jihlava and 116 km (72 mi) south-east of Prague.

== Demographics ==
Historical population
Year	Pop.	±%
1869	253	—
1880	269	+6.3%
1890	276	+2.6%
1900	258	−6.5%
1910	292	+13.2%
1921	280	−4.1%
1930	288	+2.9%
1950	194	−32.6%
1961	187	−3.6%
1970	162	−13.4%
1980	118	−27.2%
1991	87	−26.3%
2001	71	−18.4%
2011	70	−1.4%
2021	71	+1.4%
Source: Censuses
