= Krahulčí =

- Municipality
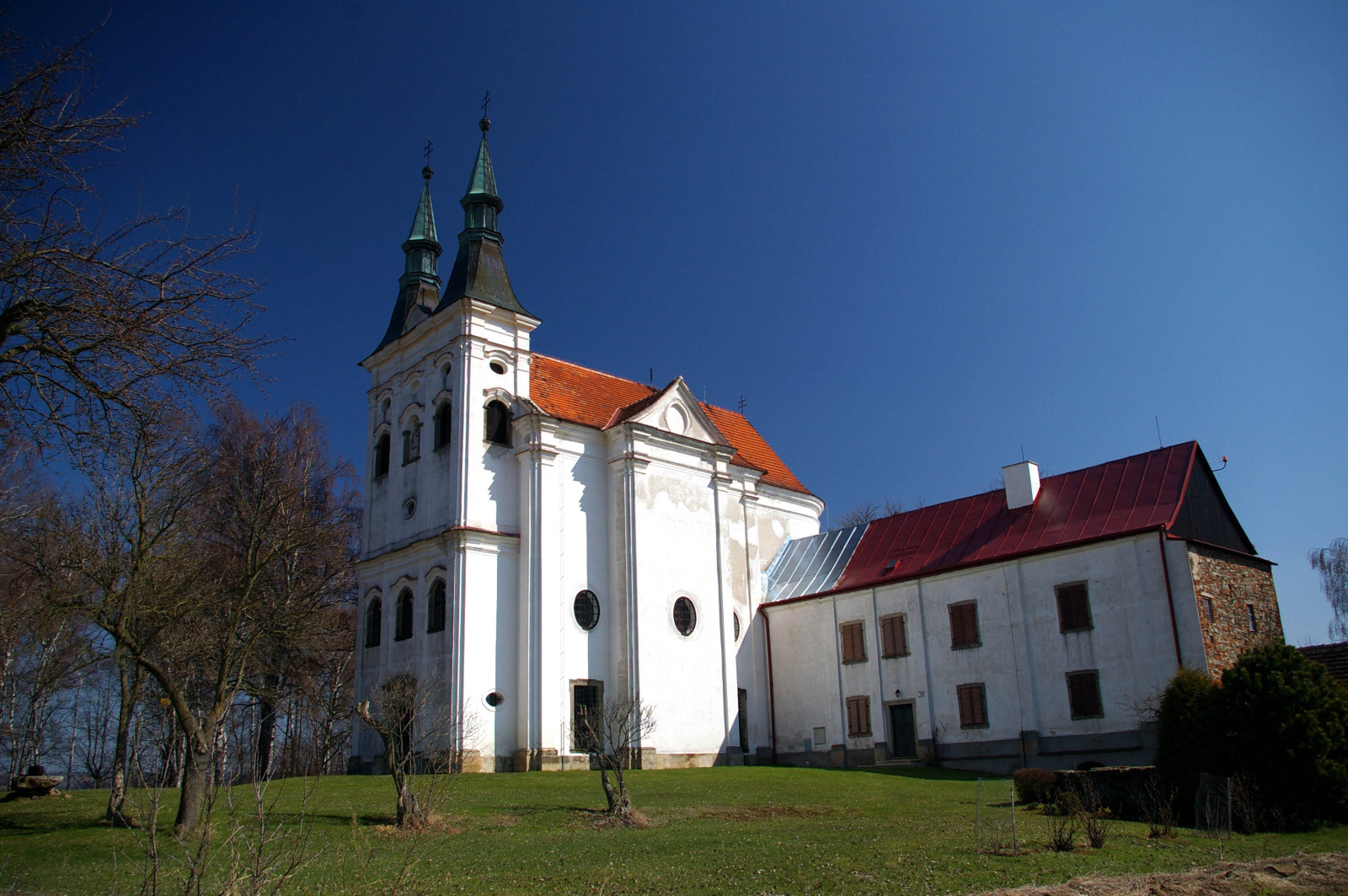
- Church of Saint John of Nepomuk

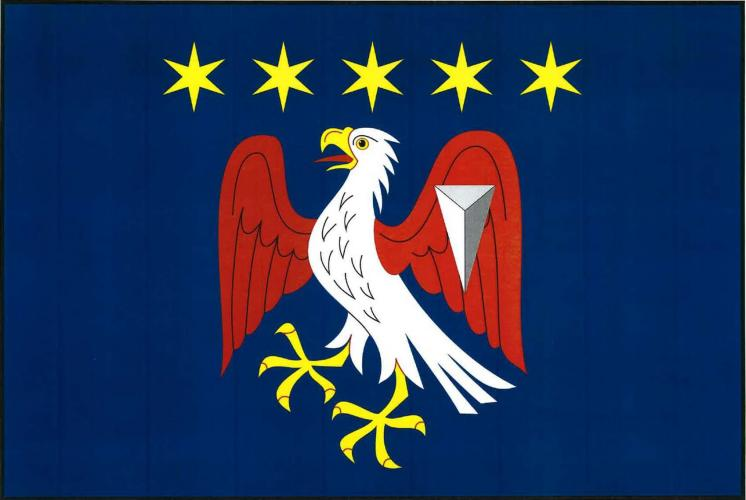
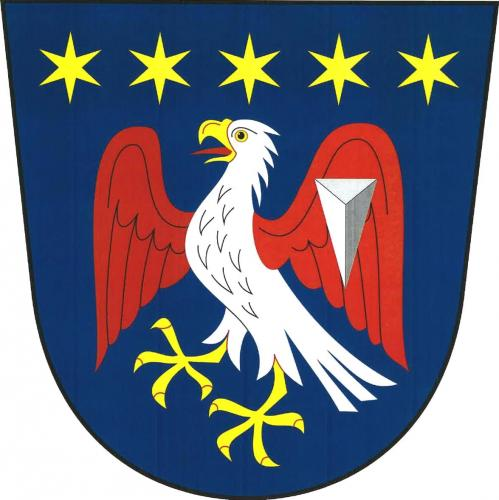
- Flag Coat of arms

- Location in the Czech Republic
- Coordinates: 49°10′55″N 15°24′53″E
- Country: Czech Republic
- Region: Vysočina
- District: Jihlava
- First mentioned: 1366

Area
  - Total: 3.64 km^{2} (1.41 sq mi)
- Elevation: 531 m (1,742 ft)

Population (2026-01-01)
  - Total: 620
  - Density: 170/km^{2} (440/sq mi)
- Time zone: UTC+1 (CET)
  - Summer (DST): UTC+2 (CEST)
- Postal code: 588 56
- Website: www.krahulci.cz

Krahulčí (Czech pronunciation: [ˈkraɦultʃiː]) is a municipality and village in Jihlava District in the Vysočina Region of the Czech Republic. It has about 600 inhabitants.

Krahulčí lies approximately 28 kilometres (17 mi) south-west of Jihlava and 124 km (77 mi) south-east of Prague.

== Demographics ==
Historical population
Year	Pop.	±%
1869	175	—
1880	212	+21.1%
1890	246	+16.0%
1900	224	−8.9%
1910	225	+0.4%
1921	263	+16.9%
1930	313	+19.0%
1950	376	+20.1%
1961	380	+1.1%
1970	386	+1.6%
1980	471	+22.0%
1991	513	+8.9%
2001	570	+11.1%
2011	652	+14.4%
2021	612	−6.1%
Source: Censuses
