= Zvolenovice =

- Municipality
- Centre of Zvolenovice

- Location in the Czech Republic
- Coordinates: 49°9′48″N 15°30′20″E
- Country: Czech Republic
- Region: Vysočina
- District: Jihlava
- First mentioned: 1366

Area
  - Total: 4.07 km^{2} (1.57 sq mi)
- Elevation: 558 m (1,831 ft)

Population (2026-01-01)
  - Total: 83
  - Density: 20/km^{2} (53/sq mi)
- Time zone: UTC+1 (CET)
  - Summer (DST): UTC+2 (CEST)
- Postal codes: 588 56
- Website: zvolenovice.cz

Zvolenovice is a municipality and village in Jihlava District in the Vysočina Region of the Czech Republic. It has about 80 inhabitants.

Zvolenovice lies approximately 27 kilometres (17 mi) south of Jihlava and 130 km (81 mi) south-east of Prague.

== Demographics ==
Historical population
Year	Pop.	±%
1869	195	—
1880	186	−4.6%
1890	184	−1.1%
1900	178	−3.3%
1910	152	−14.6%
1921	183	+20.4%
1930	185	+1.1%
1950	113	−38.9%
1961	101	−10.6%
1970	105	+4.0%
1980	83	−21.0%
1991	72	−13.3%
2001	78	+8.3%
2011	83	+6.4%
2021	80	−3.6%
Source: Censuses
