= Hostětice =

- Municipality
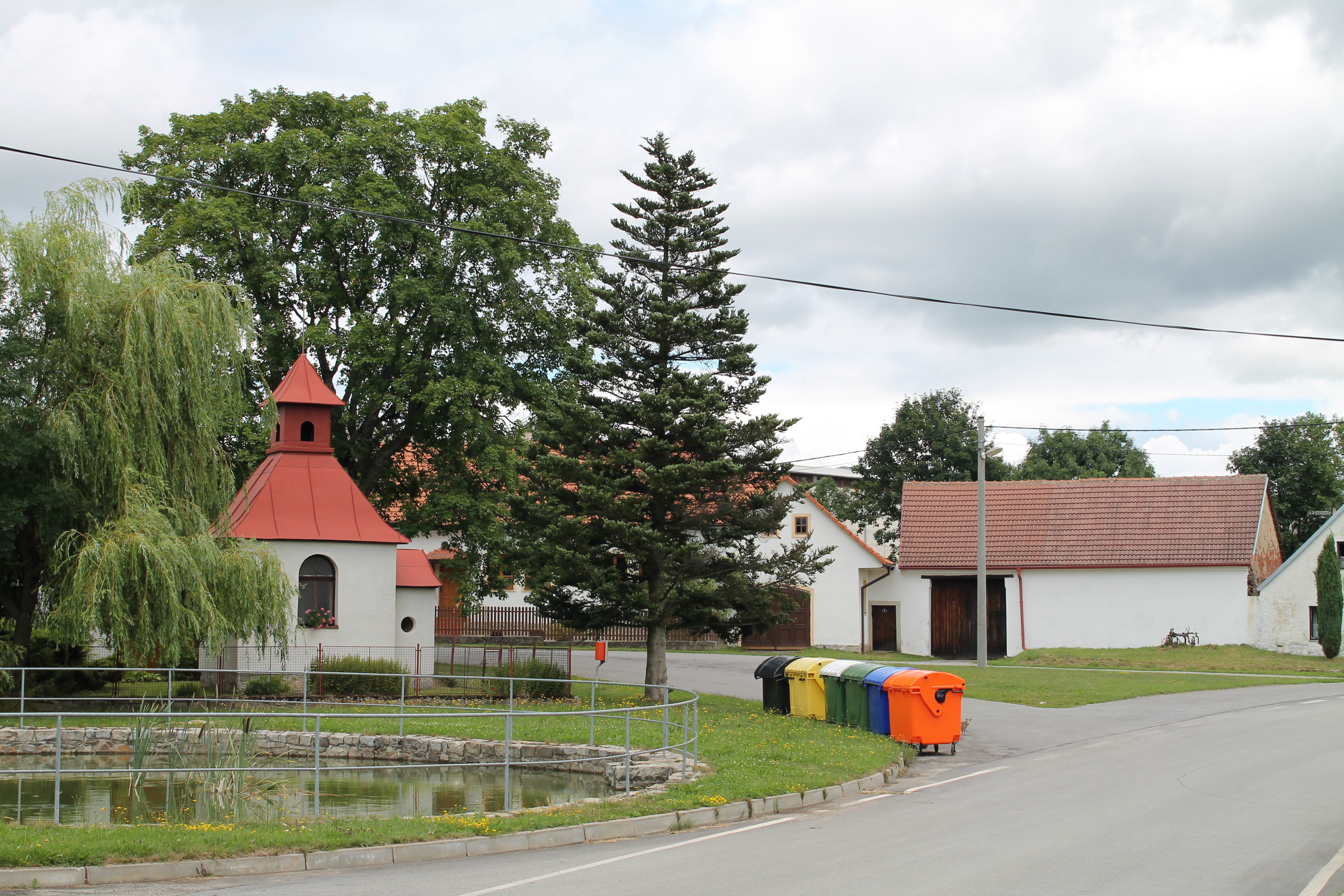
- Centre of Hostětice

- Location in the Czech Republic
- Coordinates: 49°11′30″N 15°24′51″E
- Country: Czech Republic
- Region: Vysočina
- District: Jihlava
- First mentioned: 1366

Area
  - Total: 4.49 km^{2} (1.73 sq mi)
- Elevation: 583 m (1,913 ft)

Population (2026-01-01)
  - Total: 151
  - Density: 33.6/km^{2} (87.1/sq mi)
- Time zone: UTC+1 (CET)
  - Summer (DST): UTC+2 (CEST)
- Postal code: 588 56
- Website: www.hostetice.cz

Hostětice (Czech pronunciation: [ˈɦoscɛcɪtsɛ]) is a municipality and village in Jihlava District in the Vysočina Region of the Czech Republic. It has about 200 inhabitants.

Hostětice lies approximately 26 kilometres (16 mi) south-west of Jihlava and 123 km (76 mi) south-east of Prague.

== Administrative division ==
Hostětice consists of two municipal parts (in brackets population according to the 2021 census):

- Hostětice (58)
- Částkovice (66)

== Demographics ==
Historical population
Year	Pop.	±%
1869	195	—
1880	179	−8.2%
1890	180	+0.6%
1900	166	−7.8%
1910	163	−1.8%
1921	157	−3.7%
1930	170	+8.3%
1950	166	−2.4%
1961	165	−0.6%
1970	150	−9.1%
1980	125	−16.7%
1991	144	+15.2%
2001	136	−5.6%
2011	133	−2.2%
2021	124	−6.8%
Source: Censuses
