= Strachoňovice =

- Municipality
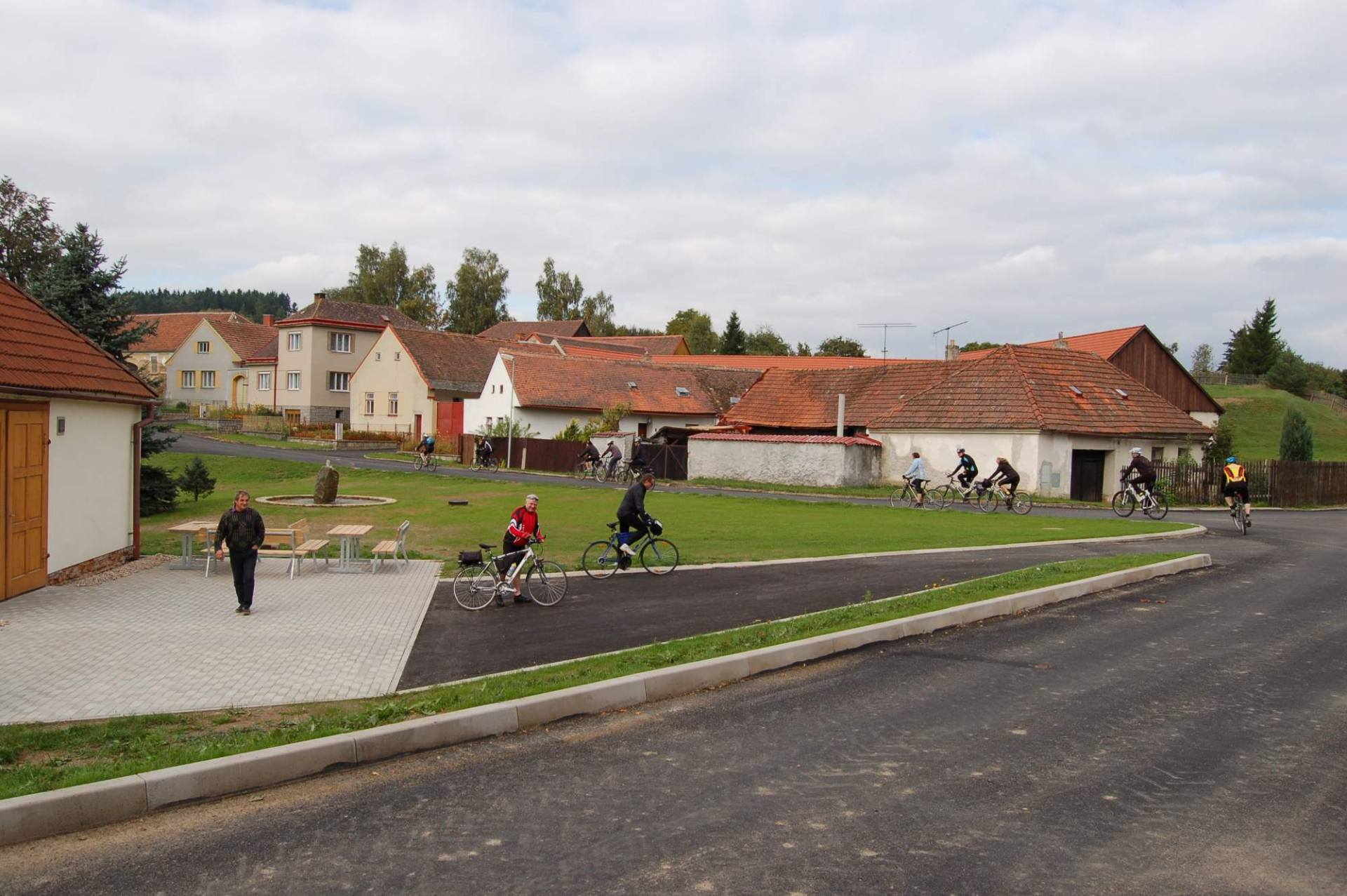
- Centre of Strachoňovice

- Location in the Czech Republic
- Coordinates: 49°8′7″N 15°29′17″E
- Country: Czech Republic
- Region: Vysočina
- District: Jihlava
- First mentioned: 1353

Area
  - Total: 4.34 km^{2} (1.68 sq mi)
- Elevation: 513 m (1,683 ft)

Population (2026-01-01)
  - Total: 100
  - Density: 23/km^{2} (60/sq mi)
- Time zone: UTC+1 (CET)
  - Summer (DST): UTC+2 (CEST)
- Postal codes: 588 56
- Website: obecstrachonovice.w1.cz

Strachoňovice (Czech pronunciation: [ˈstraxoɲovɪtsɛ]) is a municipality and village in Jihlava District in the Vysočina Region of the Czech Republic. It has about 100 inhabitants.

Strachoňovice lies approximately 30 kilometres (19 mi) south of Jihlava and 132 km (82 mi) south-east of Prague.

== Demographics ==
Historical population
Year	Pop.	±%
1869	168	—
1880	177	+5.4%
1890	159	−10.2%
1900	165	+3.8%
1910	150	−9.1%
1921	165	+10.0%
1930	143	−13.3%
1950	133	−7.0%
1961	143	+7.5%
1970	132	−7.7%
1980	97	−26.5%
1991	95	−2.1%
2001	82	−13.7%
2011	84	+2.4%
2021	93	+10.7%
Source: Censuses
