= Hojkov =

- Municipality
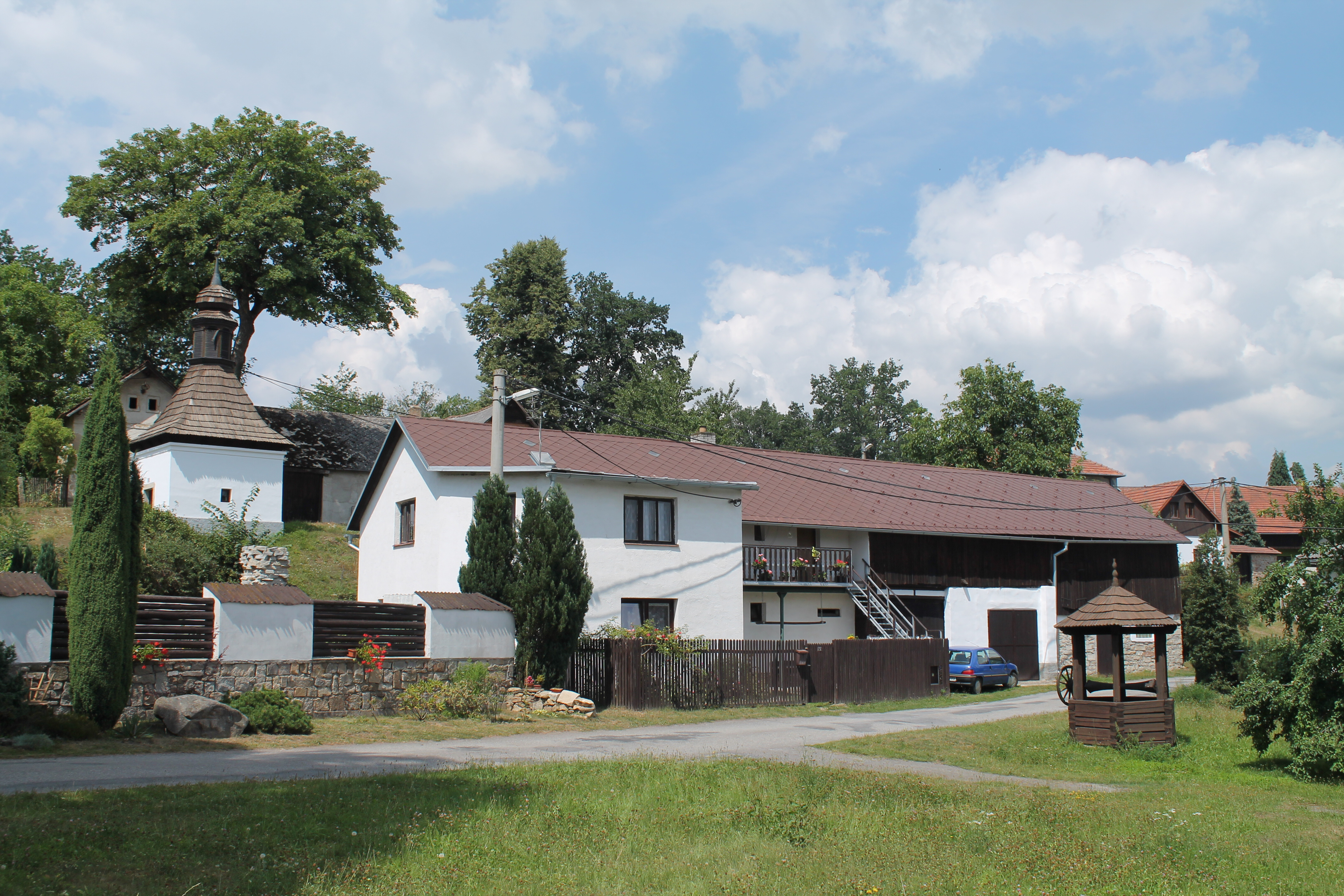
- Centre of Hojkov

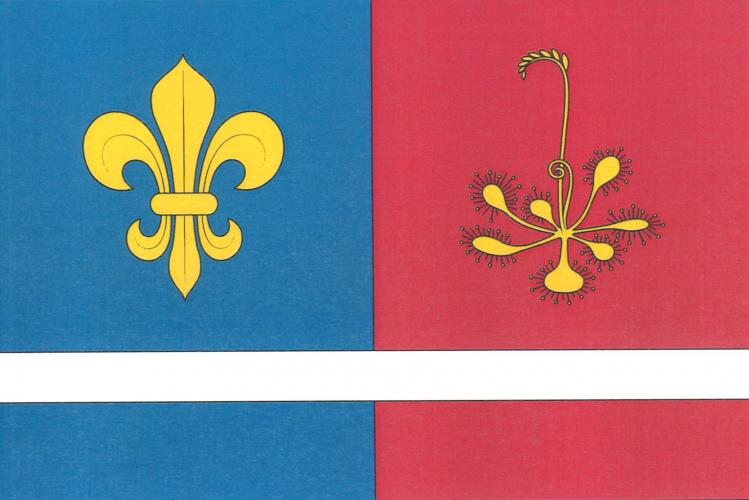
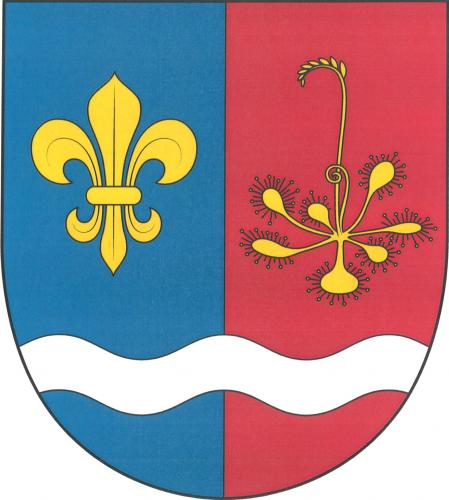
- Flag Coat of arms

- Location in the Czech Republic
- Coordinates: 49°23′21″N 15°24′49″E
- Country: Czech Republic
- Region: Vysočina
- District: Jihlava
- First mentioned: 1379

Area
  - Total: 6.43 km^{2} (2.48 sq mi)
- Elevation: 655 m (2,149 ft)

Population (2026-01-01)
  - Total: 161
  - Density: 25.0/km^{2} (64.9/sq mi)
- Time zone: UTC+1 (CET)
  - Summer (DST): UTC+2 (CEST)
- Postal code: 588 05
- Website: www.obechojkov.cz

Hojkov (Czech pronunciation: [ˈɦojkof]) is a municipality and village in Jihlava District in the Vysočina Region of the Czech Republic. It has about 200 inhabitants.

Hojkov lies approximately 13 kilometres (8 mi) west of Jihlava and 106 km (66 mi) south-east of Prague.

== Demographics ==
Historical population
Year	Pop.	±%
1869	354	—
1880	411	+16.1%
1890	414	+0.7%
1900	412	−0.5%
1910	447	+8.5%
1921	492	+10.1%
1930	442	−10.2%
1950	286	−35.3%
1961	277	−3.1%
1970	259	−6.5%
1980	195	−24.7%
1991	155	−20.5%
2001	141	−9.0%
2011	153	+8.5%
2021	145	−5.2%
Source: Censuses
