= Sedlatice =

- Municipality
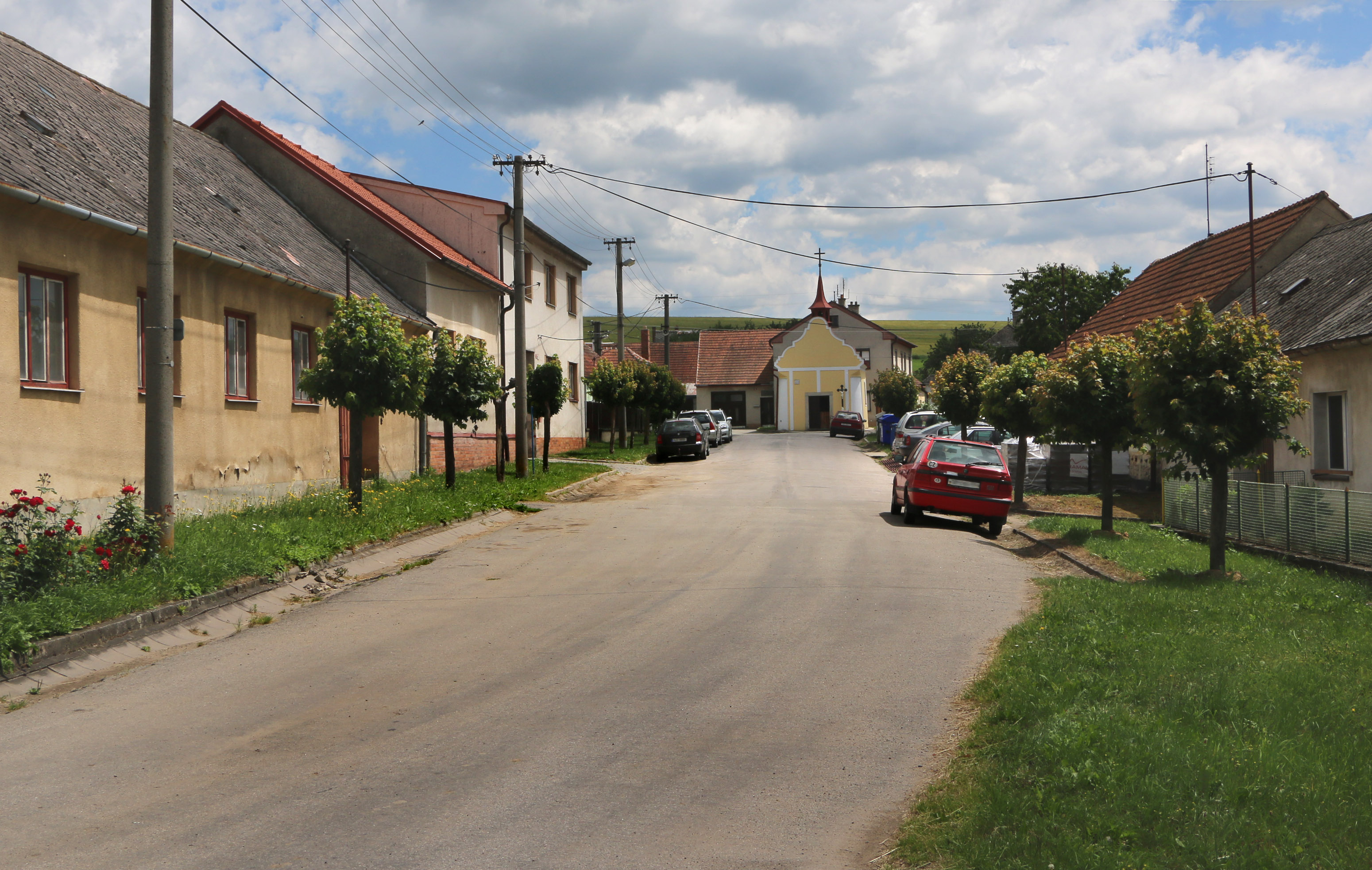
- Centre of Sedlatice

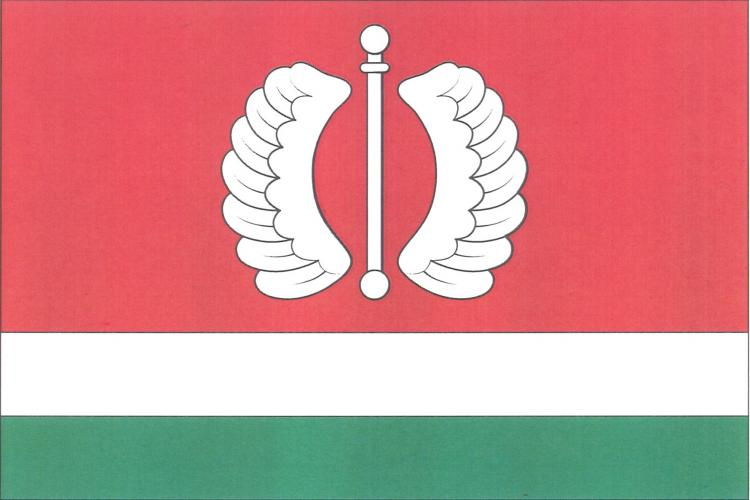
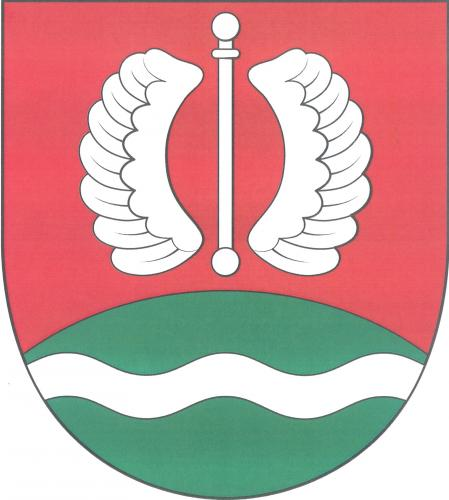
- Flag Coat of arms

- Location in the Czech Republic
- Coordinates: 49°11′32″N 15°36′48″E
- Country: Czech Republic
- Region: Vysočina
- District: Jihlava
- First mentioned: 1257

Area
  - Total: 3.41 km^{2} (1.32 sq mi)
- Elevation: 630 m (2,070 ft)

Population (2026-01-01)
  - Total: 60
  - Density: 18/km^{2} (46/sq mi)
- Time zone: UTC+1 (CET)
  - Summer (DST): UTC+2 (CEST)
- Postal code: 588 56
- Website: www.sedlatice.cz

Sedlatice (Czech pronunciation: [ˈsɛdlacɪtsɛ]) is a municipality and village in Jihlava District in the Vysočina Region of the Czech Republic. It has about 60 inhabitants.

Sedlatice lies approximately 23 kilometres (14 mi) south of Jihlava and 132 km (82 mi) south-east of Prague.

== Demographics ==
Historical population
Year	Pop.	±%
1869	154	—
1880	147	−4.5%
1890	153	+4.1%
1900	164	+7.2%
1910	155	−5.5%
1921	168	+8.4%
1930	156	−7.1%
1950	99	−36.5%
1961	120	+21.2%
1970	110	−8.3%
1980	102	−7.3%
1991	84	−17.6%
2001	72	−14.3%
2011	59	−18.1%
2021	56	−5.1%
Source: Censuses
