= Zadní Vydří =

- Municipality
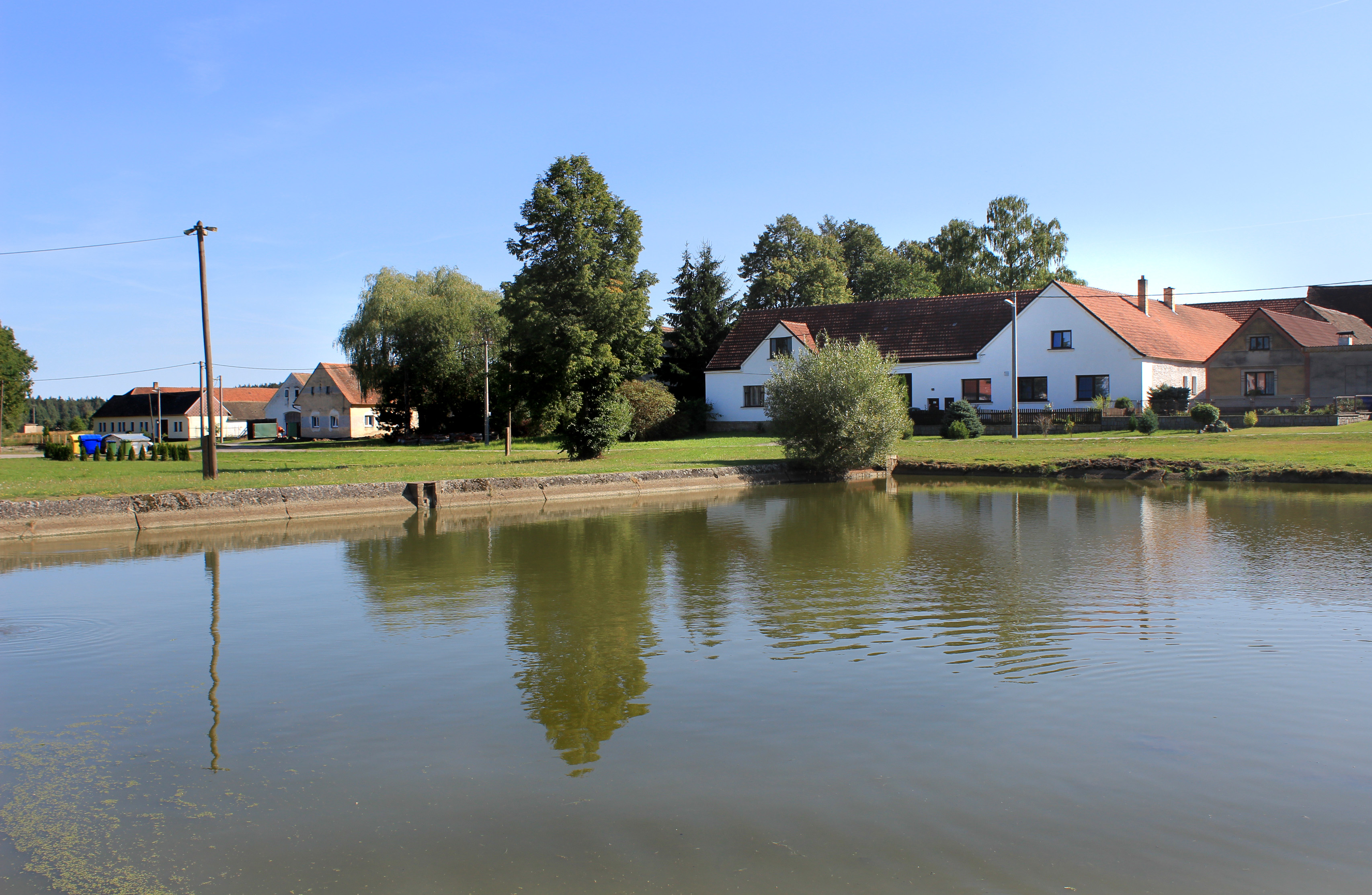
- Centre of Zadní Vydří

- Location in the Czech Republic
- Coordinates: 49°8′4″N 15°25′2″E
- Country: Czech Republic
- Region: Vysočina
- District: Jihlava
- First mentioned: 1385

Area
  - Total: 3.84 km^{2} (1.48 sq mi)
- Elevation: 512 m (1,680 ft)

Population (2026-01-01)
  - Total: 60
  - Density: 16/km^{2} (40/sq mi)
- Time zone: UTC+1 (CET)
  - Summer (DST): UTC+2 (CEST)
- Postal code: 588 56
- Website: www.zadnivydri.cz

Zadní Vydří (Czech pronunciation: [ˈzaɟɲiː ˈvɪdr̝iː]) is a municipality and village in Jihlava District in the Vysočina Region of the Czech Republic. It has about 60 inhabitants.

Zadní Vydří lies approximately 32 kilometres (20 mi) south-west of Jihlava and 129 km (80 mi) south-east of Prague.

== Demographics ==
Historical population
Year	Pop.	±%
1869	165	—
1880	163	−1.2%
1890	122	−25.2%
1900	141	+15.6%
1910	138	−2.1%
1921	147	+6.5%
1930	135	−8.2%
1950	96	−28.9%
1961	69	−28.1%
1970	65	−5.8%
1980	67	+3.1%
1991	56	−16.4%
2001	52	−7.1%
2011	57	+9.6%
2021	46	−19.3%
Source: Censuses
