= Borovná =

- Municipality
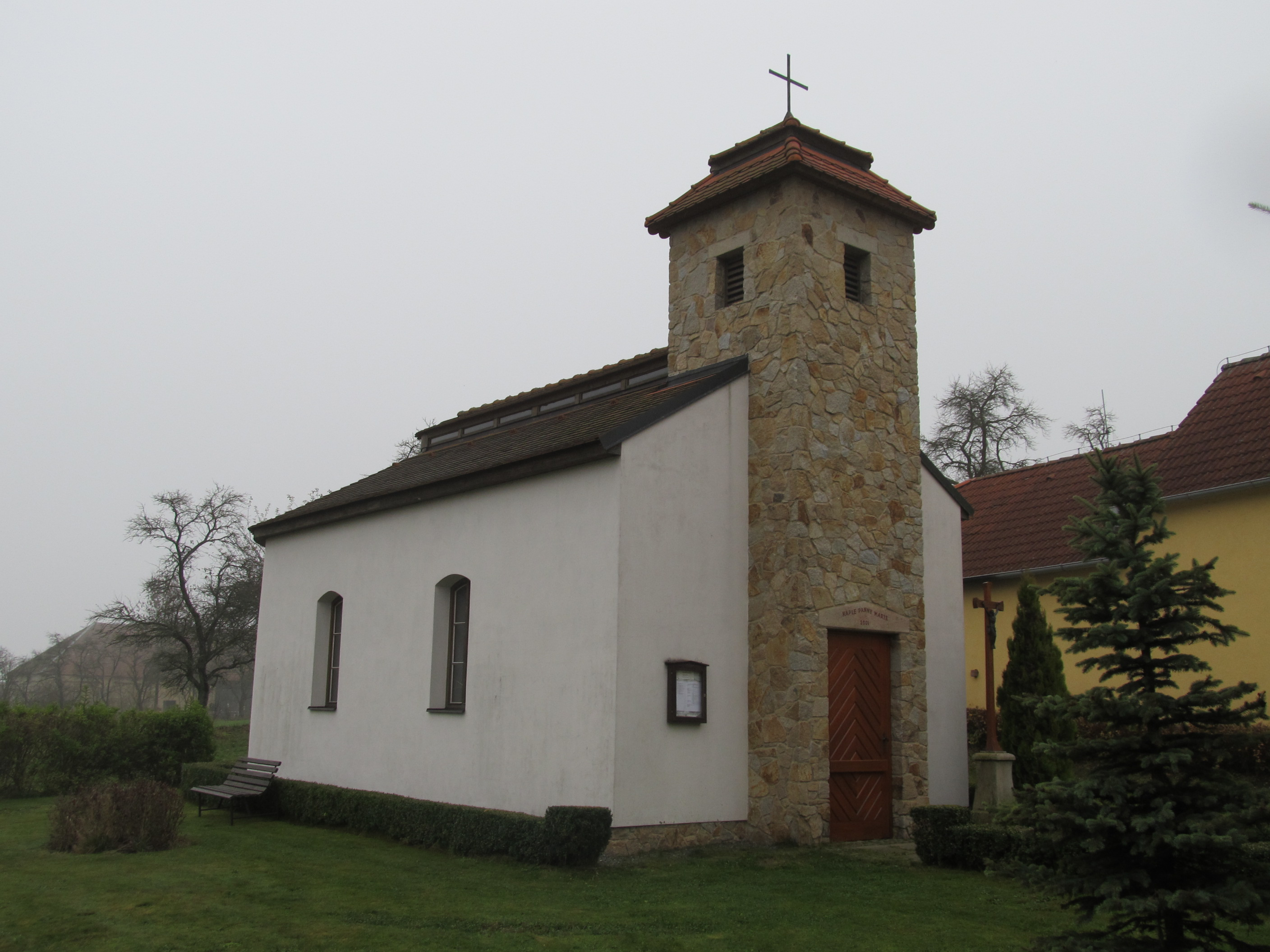
- Chapel of the Virgin Mary

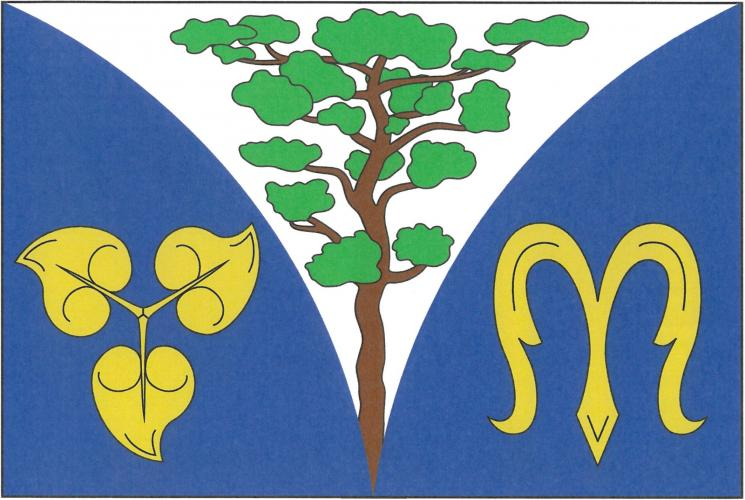
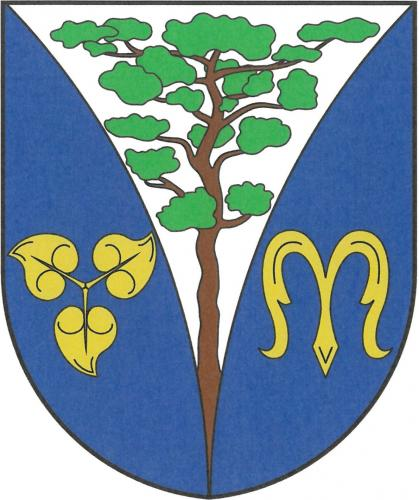
- Flag Coat of arms

- Location in the Czech Republic
- Coordinates: 49°9′53″N 15°23′41″E
- Country: Czech Republic
- Region: Vysočina
- District: Jihlava
- First mentioned: 1365

Area
  - Total: 5.20 km^{2} (2.01 sq mi)
- Elevation: 552 m (1,811 ft)

Population (2026-01-01)
  - Total: 86
  - Density: 17/km^{2} (43/sq mi)
- Time zone: UTC+1 (CET)
  - Summer (DST): UTC+2 (CEST)
- Postal codes: 588 56
- Website: www.borovna.cz

Borovná (Czech pronunciation: [ˈborovnaː]) is a municipality and village in Jihlava District in the Vysočina Region of the Czech Republic. It has about 90 inhabitants.

Borovná lies approximately 30 kilometres (19 mi) south-west of Jihlava and 124 km (77 mi) south-east of Prague.

== Demographics ==
Historical population
Year	Pop.	±%
1869	173	—
1880	191	+10.4%
1890	215	+12.6%
1900	195	−9.3%
1910	174	−10.8%
1921	202	+16.1%
1930	199	−1.5%
1950	139	−30.2%
1961	157	+12.9%
1970	129	−17.8%
1980	112	−13.2%
1991	99	−11.6%
2001	89	−10.1%
2011	71	−20.2%
2021	77	+8.5%
Source: Censuses
