= Dolní Vilímeč =

- Municipality
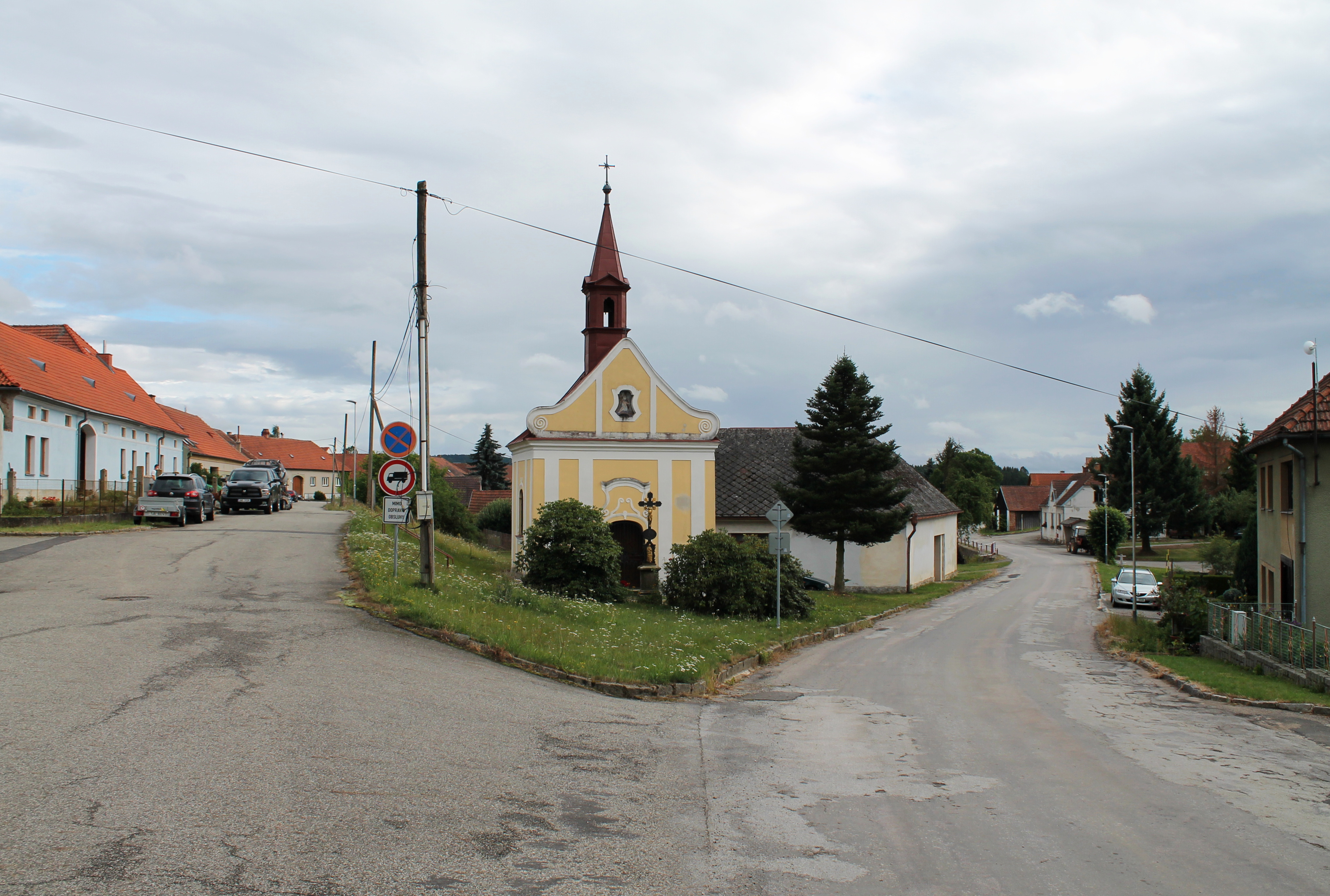
- Chapel of Saints Cyril and Methodius

- Location in the Czech Republic
- Coordinates: 49°8′9″N 15°31′14″E
- Country: Czech Republic
- Region: Vysočina
- District: Jihlava
- First mentioned: 1349

Area
  - Total: 5.46 km^{2} (2.11 sq mi)
- Elevation: 534 m (1,752 ft)

Population (2026-01-01)
  - Total: 96
  - Density: 18/km^{2} (46/sq mi)
- Time zone: UTC+1 (CET)
  - Summer (DST): UTC+2 (CEST)
- Postal code: 588 56
- Website: www.dolnivilimec.cz

Dolní Vilímeč (Czech pronunciation: [ˈdolɲiː ˈvɪliːmɛtʃ]; German: Unter Wilimetsch) is a municipality and village in Jihlava District in the Vysočina Region of the Czech Republic. It has about 100 inhabitants.

Dolní Vilímeč lies approximately 30 kilometres (19 mi) south of Jihlava and 132 km (82 mi) south-east of Prague.

== Demographics ==
Historical population
Year	Pop.	±%
1869	221	—
1880	220	−0.5%
1890	217	−1.4%
1900	213	−1.8%
1910	217	+1.9%
1921	234	+7.8%
1930	211	−9.8%
1950	138	−34.6%
1961	143	+3.6%
1970	128	−10.5%
1980	115	−10.2%
1991	104	−9.6%
2001	96	−7.7%
2011	91	−5.2%
2021	99	+8.8%
Source: Censuses
