= Jihlava agglomeration =

Area of the Czech Republic

Jihlava agglomeration Jihlavská aglomerace
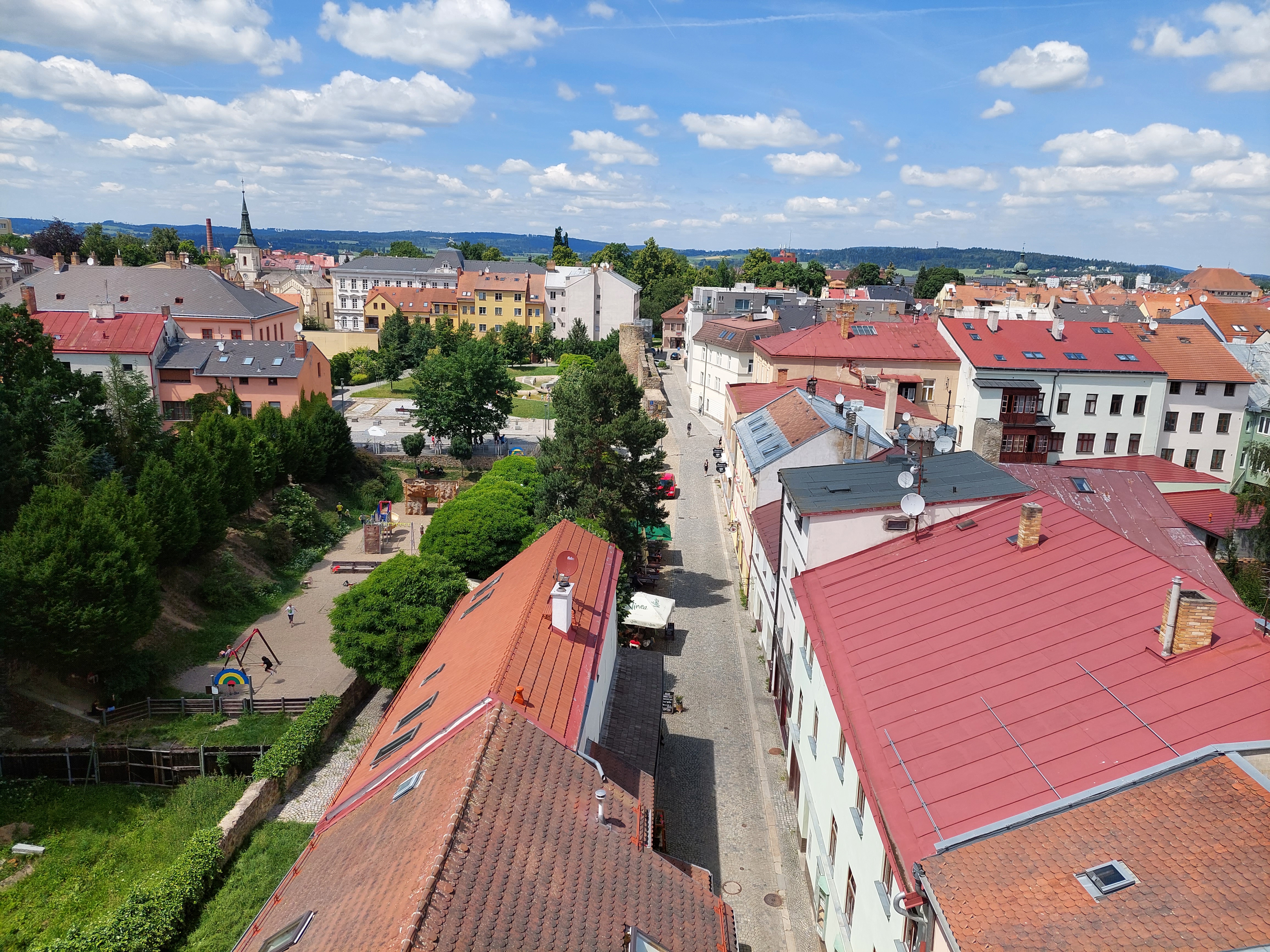
- View of Jihlava
- Country: Czech Republic
- Region: Vysočina
- Districts: Jihlava, Havlíčkův Brod
- Largest city: Jihlava
- Municipalities: 56

Area
  - Total: 718.6 km^{2} (277.5 sq mi)

Population (2026)
  - Total: 97,646
  - Density: 135.9/km^{2} (351.9/sq mi)
- Time zone: UTC+1 (CET)
  - Summer (DST): UTC+2 (CEST)

The Jihlava agglomeration (Czech: Jihlavská aglomerace) is the agglomeration of the city of Jihlava and its surroundings in the region of Vysočina in the Czech Republic. It was defined in 2020 as a tool for drawing money from the European Structural and Investment Funds and is valid in 2021–2027. The agglomeration has a population of 97,646, which makes it the least populated agglomeration in the country.

== Definition ==
The Jihlava agglomeration was defined in 2020 by the Ministry of Regional Development of the Czech Republic for the purposes of the so-called Integrated Territorial Investment (ITI), which is a tool for drawing money from the European Structural and Investment Funds.

The territory was defined on the basis of a coefficient composed of three methods: integrated system of centres (i.e. delineation of commuting flows based on mobile operator data from 2019), time spent in core cities (based on mobile operator data from 2019) and residential suburbanization zones (based on statistics of realized housing construction and directional migration from the core of the agglomeration to suburban municipalities in the period 2009–2016). The scope of the territory is valid for the period 2021–2027.

== Municipalities ==
The agglomeration includes 56 municipalities.

Name	Population (2026)
Bílý Kámen	284
Bítovčice	395
Boršov	184
Brtnice	3,870
Brzkov	366
Cejle	519
Cerekvička-Rosice	238
Čížov	294
Dobronín	1,851
Dobroutov	310
Dolní Cerekev	1,245
Dušejov	465
Dvorce	203
Hubenov	145
Hybrálec	486
Jamné	576
Jezdovice	268
Ježená	121
Jihlava	53,686
Kalhov	123
Kamenice	1,973
Kamenná	191
Kostelec	983
Kozlov	461
Luka nad Jihlavou	3,184
Malý Beranov	649
Měšín	271
Milíčov	136
Mirošov	168
Plandry	185
Polná	5,305
Puklice	904
Rančířov	485
Rantířov	468
Rybné	119
Šimanov	233
Smrčná	489
Stáj	185
Štoky	1,980
Stonařov	1,075
Střítež	481
Suchá	244
Třešť	5,801
Ústí	225
Velký Beranov	1,316
Větrný Jeníkov	650
Věžnice (Havlíčkův Brod District)	453
Věžnice (Jihlava District)	157
Věžnička	149
Vílanec	318
Vyskytná nad Jihlavou	979
Vysoké Studnice	425
Záborná	246
Zbilidy	213
Ždírec	437
Zhoř	479
Total	97,646
