= Urban areas in the Czech Republic =

This is a list of urban areas in the Czech Republic. There are 3 metropolitan areas and 10 agglomerations. The populations of the urban areas are calculated by combining all of their municipalities' latest populations, as the last available population data was from 2019.

Metropolitan area/agglomeration	Population (2024)	Area (km^{2})	Density (inhab./km^{2})	Municipalities
Prague metropolitan area	2,264,690	4,822	469	491
Ostrava metropolitan area	970,189	2,710	358	172
Brno metropolitan area	729,405	1,978	368	184
Ústí nad Labem-Chomutov agglomeration	553,455	2,317	238	132
Olomouc agglomeration	400,933	1,731	231	174
Hradec Králové-Pardubice agglomeration	350,400	1,308	267	152
Plzeň agglomeration	328,424	1,323	248	108
Liberec-Jablonec agglomeration	226,835	808	280	47
České Budějovice agglomeration	179,741	1,001	179	81
Karlovy Vary agglomeration	138,355	610	226	33
Zlín agglomeration	130,335	439	296	36
Mladá Boleslav agglomeration	107,282	597	179	63
Jihlava agglomeration	97,888	718	136	56
