= Mirošov (Jihlava District) =

- Municipality
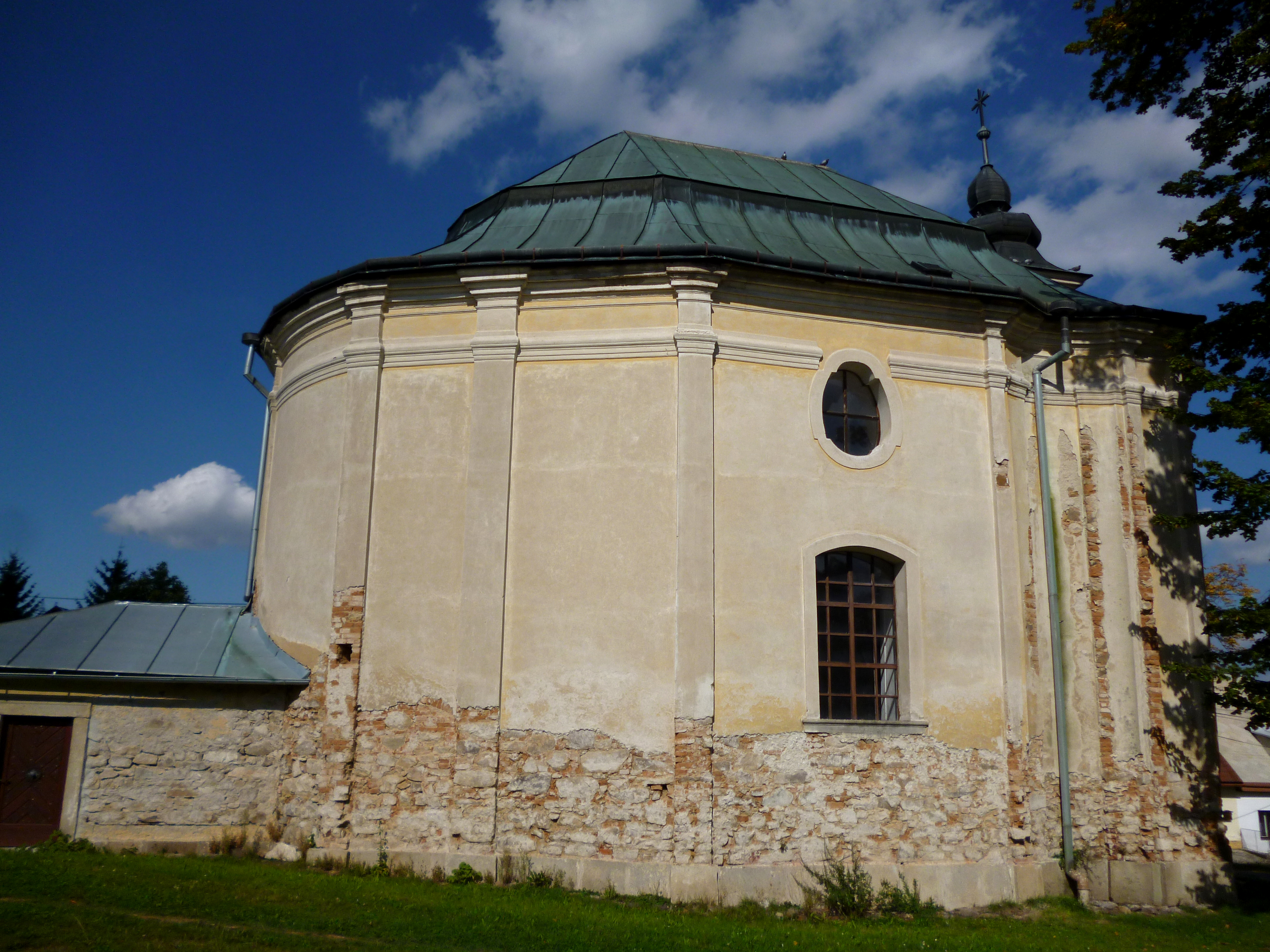
- Church of Saint Joseph

- Location in the Czech Republic
- Coordinates: 49°23′22″N 15°27′49″E
- Country: Czech Republic
- Region: Vysočina
- District: Jihlava
- First mentioned: 1361

Area
  - Total: 4.13 km^{2} (1.59 sq mi)
- Elevation: 565 m (1,854 ft)

Population (2026-01-01)
  - Total: 168
  - Density: 40.7/km^{2} (105/sq mi)
- Time zone: UTC+1 (CET)
  - Summer (DST): UTC+2 (CEST)
- Postal code: 588 05
- Website: www.obecmirosov.cz

Mirošov (Czech pronunciation: [ˈmɪroʃof]) is a municipality and village in Jihlava District in the Vysočina Region of the Czech Republic. It has about 200 inhabitants.

Mirošov lies approximately 10 kilometres (6 mi) west of Jihlava and 108 km (67 mi) south-east of Prague.

== Administrative division ==
Mirošov consists of two municipal parts (in brackets population according to the 2021 census):

- Mirošov (83)
- Jedlov (75)

== Demographics ==
Historical population
Year	Pop.	±%
1869	560	—
1880	441	−21.3%
1890	397	−10.0%
1900	350	−11.8%
1910	354	+1.1%
1921	362	+2.3%
1930	344	−5.0%
1950	227	−34.0%
1961	259	+14.1%
1970	234	−9.7%
1980	228	−2.6%
1991	177	−22.4%
2001	189	+6.8%
2011	196	+3.7%
2021	158	−19.4%
Source: Censuses
