= Zbilidy =

- Municipality
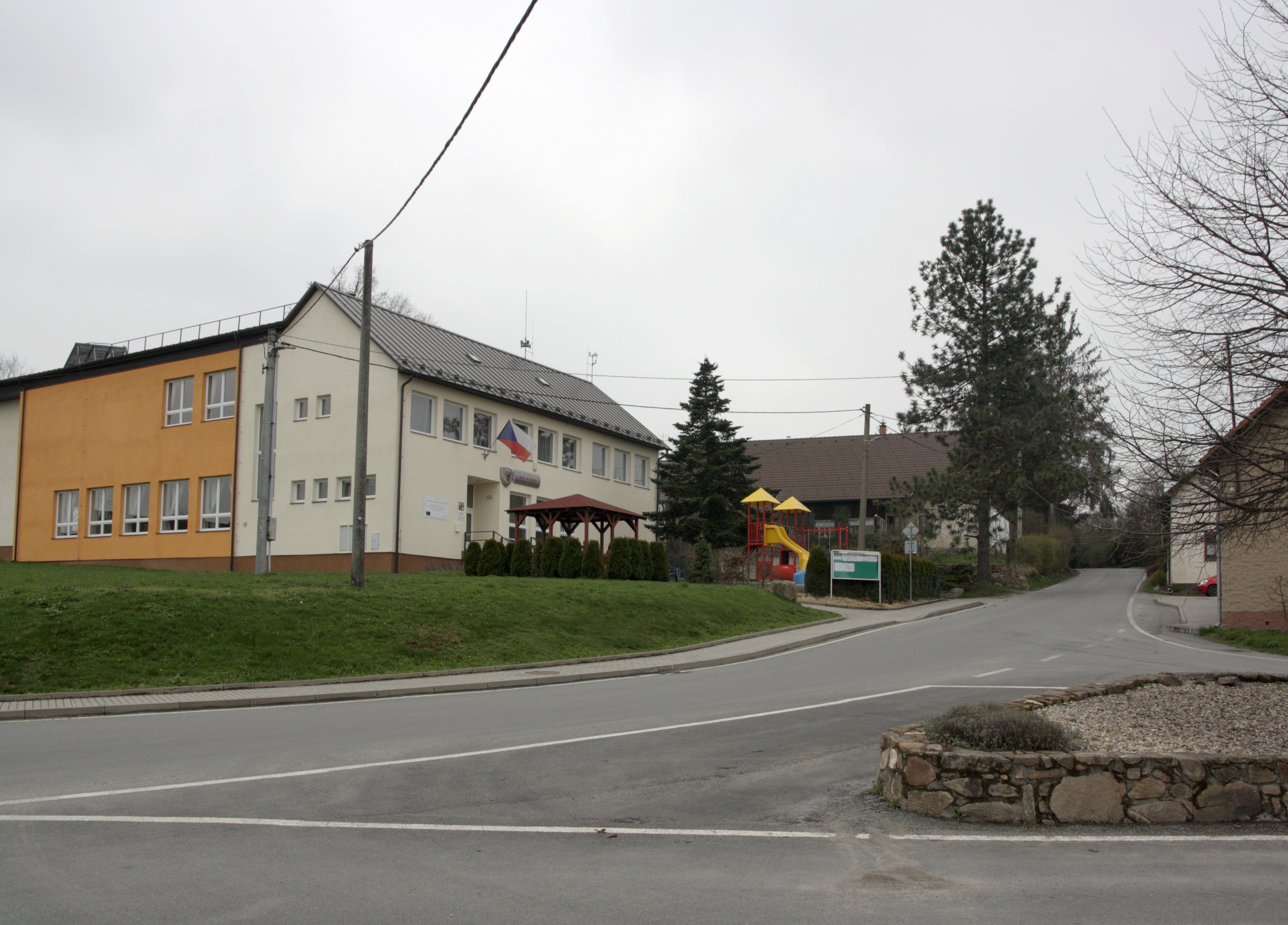
- Municipal office

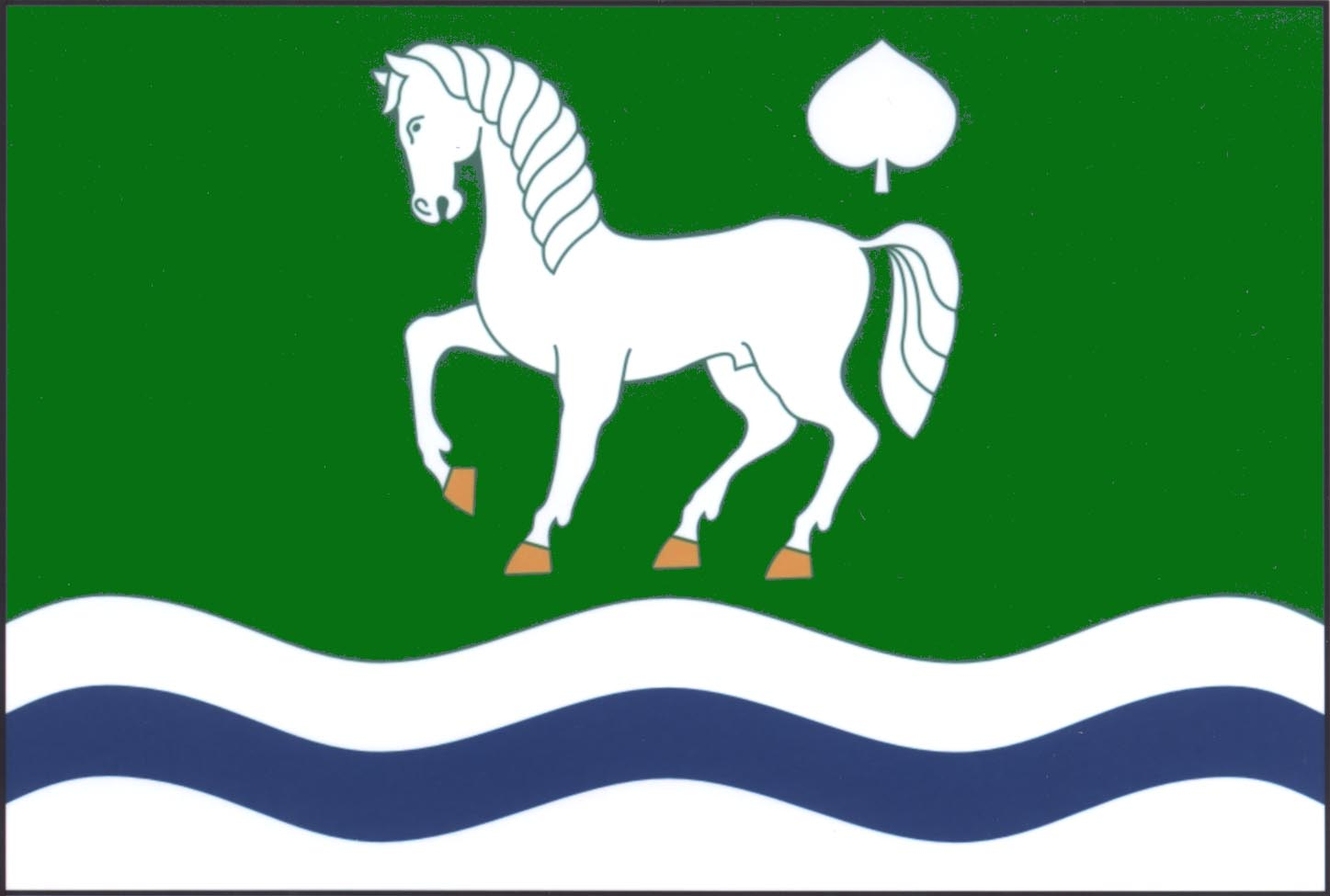
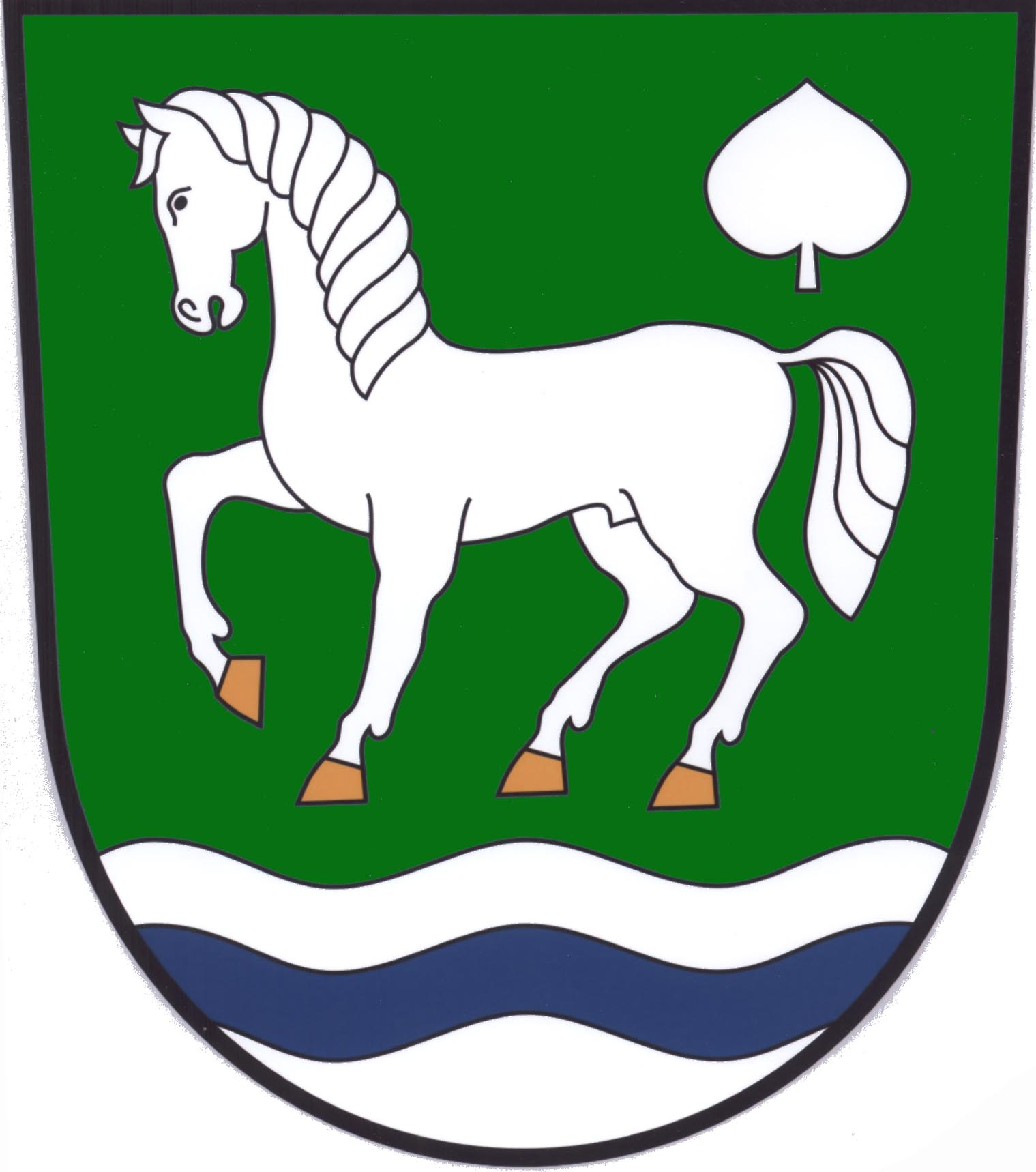
- Flag Coat of arms

- Location in the Czech Republic
- Coordinates: 49°26′38″N 15°25′22″E
- Country: Czech Republic
- Region: Vysočina
- District: Jihlava
- First mentioned: 1341

Area
  - Total: 10.43 km^{2} (4.03 sq mi)
- Elevation: 636 m (2,087 ft)

Population (2026-01-01)
  - Total: 213
  - Density: 20.4/km^{2} (52.9/sq mi)
- Time zone: UTC+1 (CET)
  - Summer (DST): UTC+2 (CEST)
- Postal code: 588 05
- Website: www.zbilidy.cz

Zbilidy (Czech pronunciation: [ˈzbɪlɪdɪ]) is a municipality and village in Jihlava District in the Vysočina Region of the Czech Republic. It has about 200 inhabitants.

Zbilidy lies approximately 13 kilometres (8 mi) north-west of Jihlava and 102 km (63 mi) south-east of Prague.

== Demographics ==
Historical population
Year	Pop.	±%
1869	431	—
1880	486	+12.8%
1890	442	−9.1%
1900	394	−10.9%
1910	329	−16.5%
1921	395	+20.1%
1930	328	−17.0%
1950	224	−31.7%
1961	227	+1.3%
1970	176	−22.5%
1980	153	−13.1%
1991	164	+7.2%
2001	151	−7.9%
2011	180	+19.2%
2021	220	+22.2%
Source: Censuses
