= Vyskytná nad Jihlavou =

- Municipality
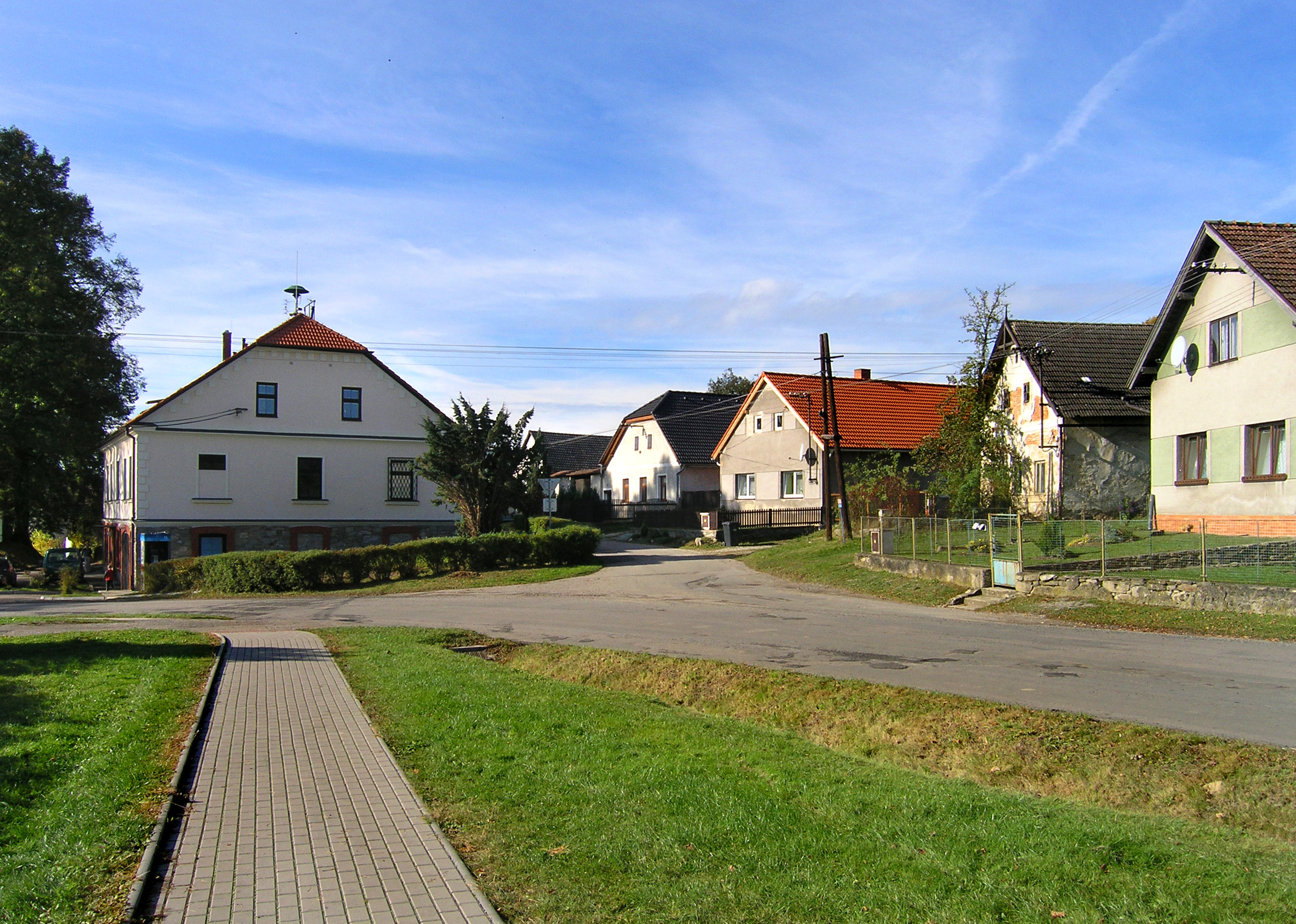
- Common in Vyskytná nad Jihlavou

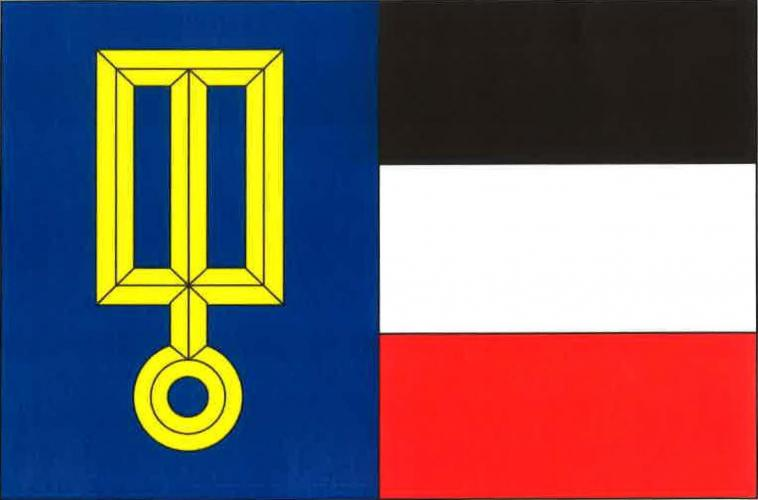
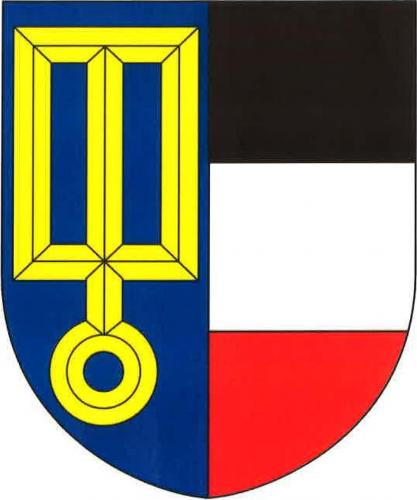
- Flag Coat of arms

- Location in the Czech Republic
- Coordinates: 49°25′10″N 15°30′29″E
- Country: Czech Republic
- Region: Vysočina
- District: Jihlava
- First mentioned: 1226

Area
  - Total: 21.23 km^{2} (8.20 sq mi)
- Elevation: 530 m (1,740 ft)

Population (2026-01-01)
  - Total: 979
  - Density: 46.1/km^{2} (119/sq mi)
- Time zone: UTC+1 (CET)
  - Summer (DST): UTC+2 (CEST)
- Postal code: 588 41
- Website: www.vyskytnanadjihlavou.cz

Vyskytná nad Jihlavou (Czech pronunciation: [ˈvɪskɪtnaː ˈnad jɪɦlavou]; German: Deutsch Gießhübel) is a municipality and village in Jihlava District in the Vysočina Region of the Czech Republic. It has about 1,000 inhabitants.

Vyskytná nad Jihlavou lies approximately 7 kilometres (4 mi) west of Jihlava and 108 km (67 mi) south-east of Prague.

== Administrative division ==
Vyskytná nad Jihlavou consists of four municipal parts (in brackets population according to the 2021 census):

- Vyskytná nad Jihlavou (521)
- Hlávkov (78)
- Jiřín (157)
- Rounek (161)

== Demographics ==
Historical population
Year	Pop.	±%
1869	1,040	—
1880	1,116	+7.3%
1890	1,139	+2.1%
1900	1,158	+1.7%
1910	1,150	−0.7%
1921	1,082	−5.9%
1930	1,083	+0.1%
1950	804	−25.8%
1961	825	+2.6%
1970	687	−16.7%
1980	654	−4.8%
1991	599	−8.4%
2001	623	+4.0%
2011	842	+35.2%
2021	917	+8.9%
Source: Censuses
