= Šimanov =

- Municipality
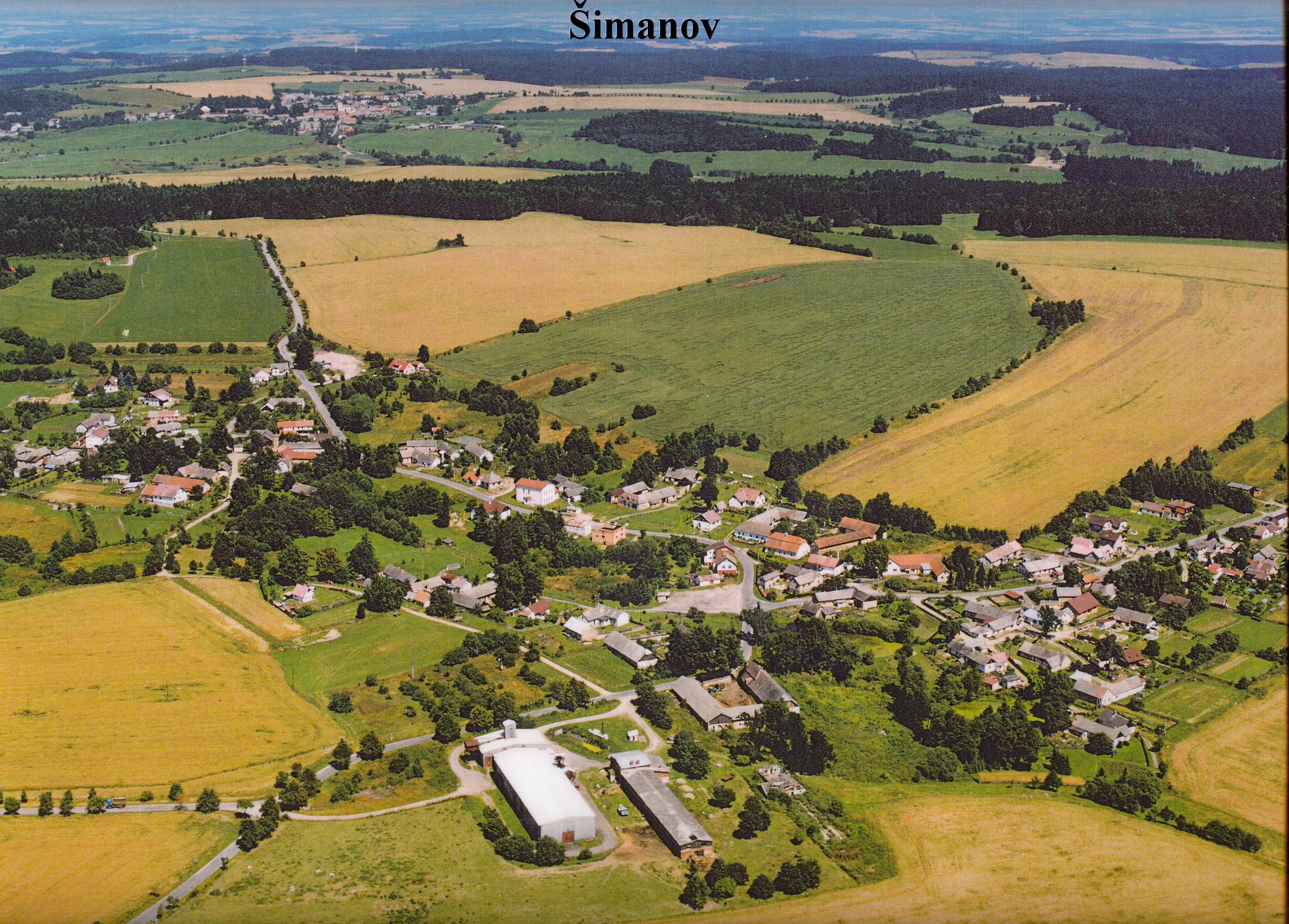
- Aerial view

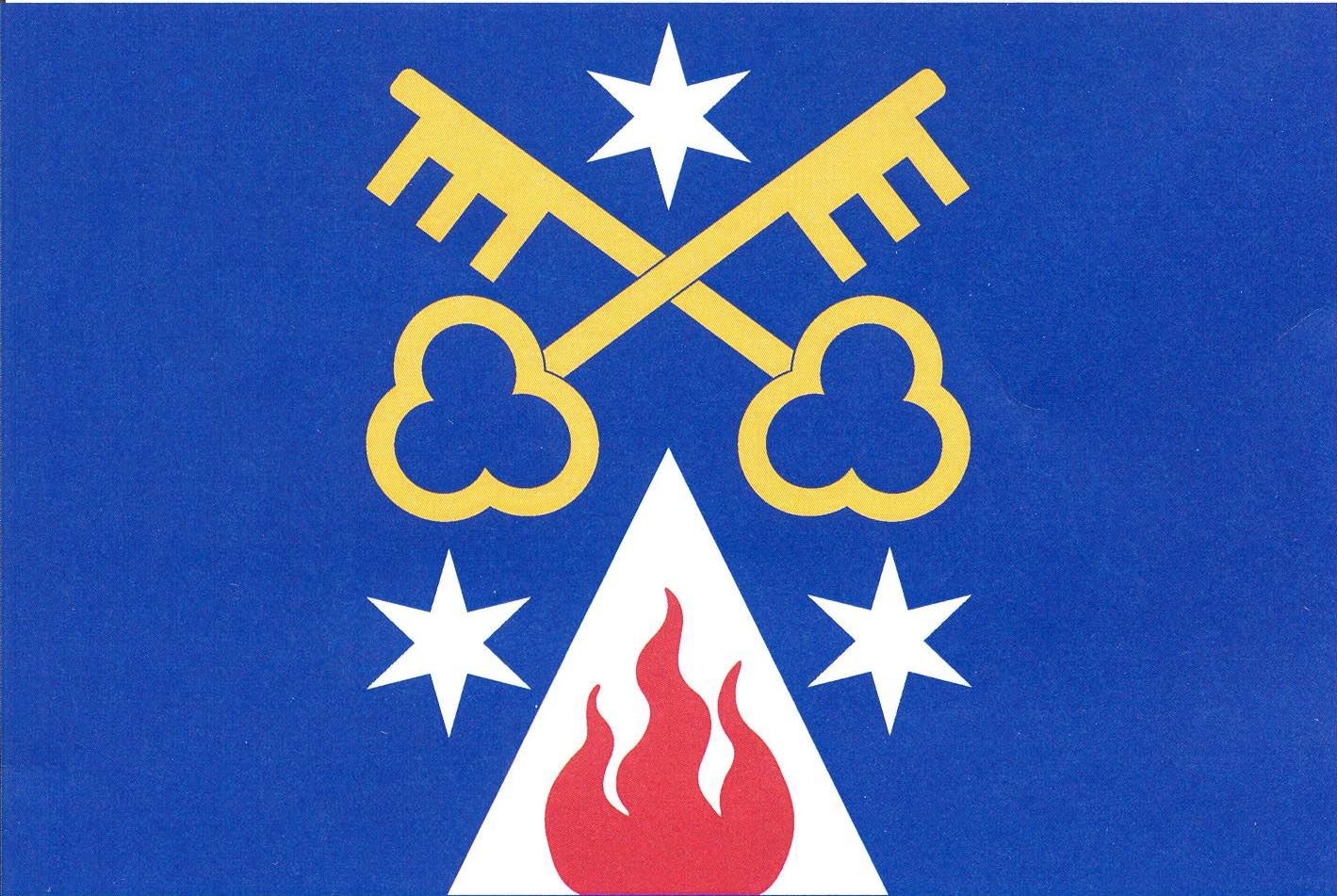
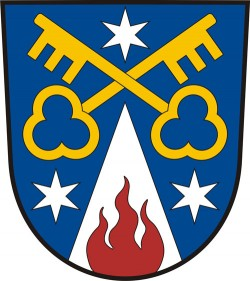
- Flag Coat of arms

- Location in the Czech Republic
- Coordinates: 49°27′29″N 15°27′0″E
- Country: Czech Republic
- Region: Vysočina
- District: Jihlava
- First mentioned: 1468

Area
  - Total: 6.22 km^{2} (2.40 sq mi)
- Elevation: 630 m (2,070 ft)

Population (2026-01-01)
  - Total: 233
  - Density: 37.5/km^{2} (97.0/sq mi)
- Time zone: UTC+1 (CET)
  - Summer (DST): UTC+2 (CEST)
- Postal code: 588 42
- Website: www.simanov-obec.cz

Šimanov (Czech pronunciation: [ˈʃɪmanof]) is a municipality and village in Jihlava District in the Vysočina Region of the Czech Republic. It has about 200 inhabitants.

Šimanov lies approximately 12 kilometres (7 mi) north-west of Jihlava and 102 km (63 mi) south-east of Prague.

== Demographics ==
Historical population
Year	Pop.	±%
1869	517	—
1880	486	−6.0%
1890	502	+3.3%
1900	434	−13.5%
1910	442	+1.8%
1921	440	−0.5%
1930	363	−17.5%
1950	304	−16.3%
1961	287	−5.6%
1970	248	−13.6%
1980	206	−16.9%
1991	173	−16.0%
2001	179	+3.5%
2011	203	+13.4%
2021	215	+5.9%
Source: Censuses
