= Ježená =

- Municipality
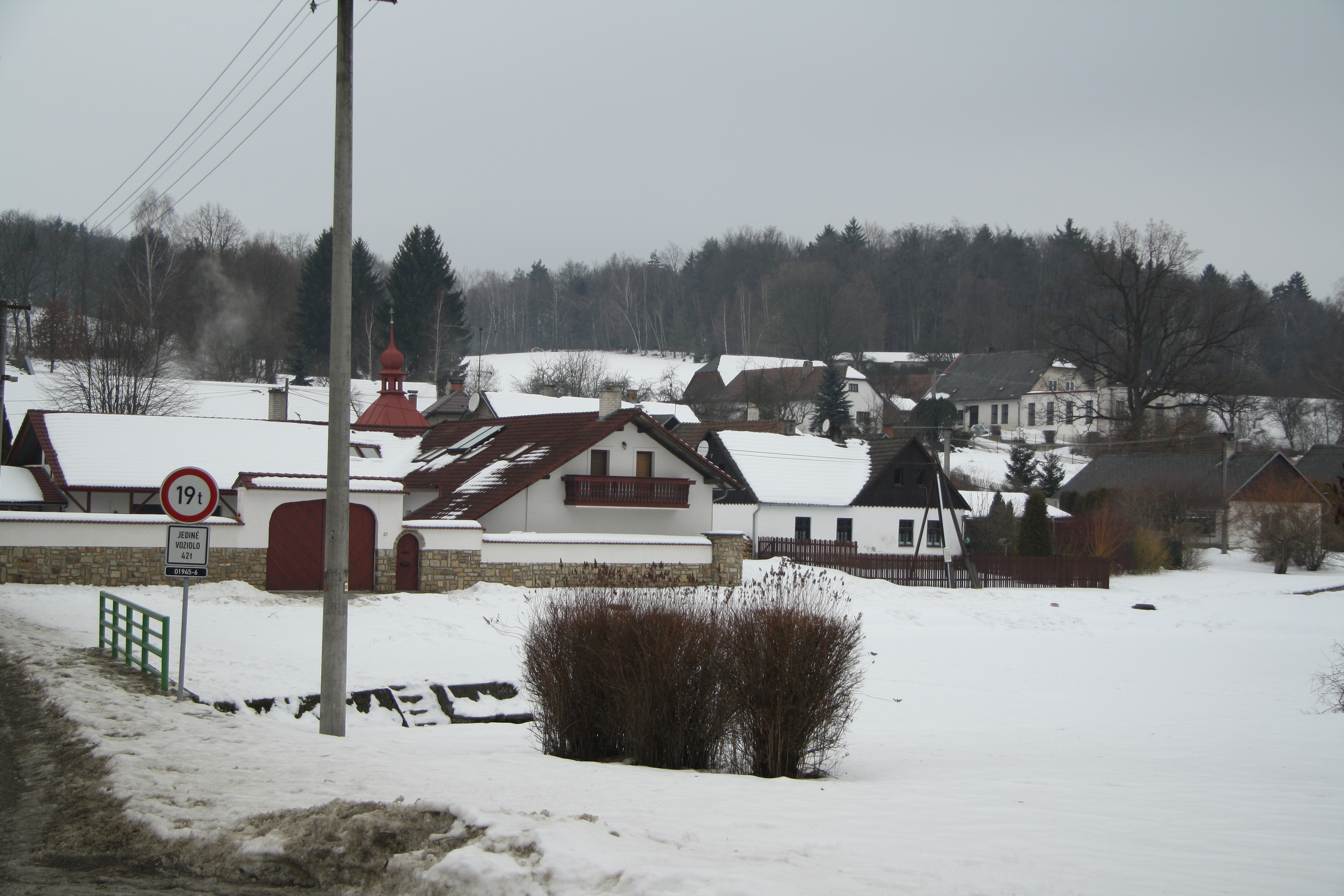
- Centre of Ježená

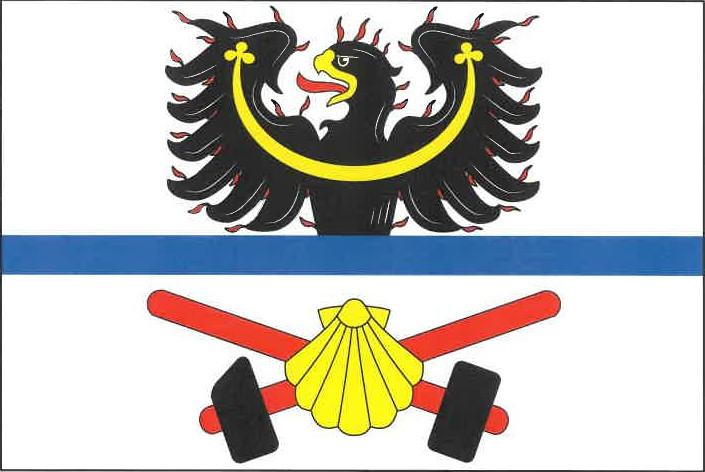
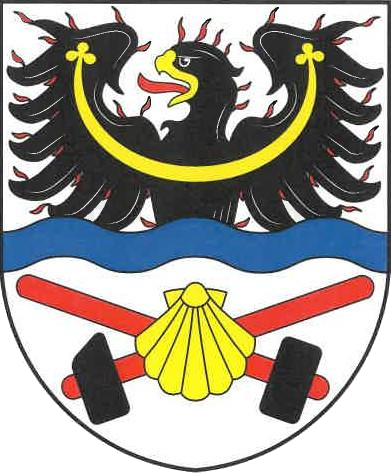
- Flag Coat of arms

- Location in the Czech Republic
- Coordinates: 49°24′59″N 15°27′56″E
- Country: Czech Republic
- Region: Vysočina
- District: Jihlava
- First mentioned: 1226

Area
  - Total: 4.47 km^{2} (1.73 sq mi)
- Elevation: 552 m (1,811 ft)

Population (2026-01-01)
  - Total: 121
  - Density: 27.1/km^{2} (70.1/sq mi)
- Time zone: UTC+1 (CET)
  - Summer (DST): UTC+2 (CEST)
- Postal code: 588 41
- Website: www.jezena.cz

Ježená (Czech pronunciation: [ˈjɛʒɛnaː]) is a municipality and village in Jihlava District in the Vysočina Region of the Czech Republic. It has about 100 inhabitants.

Ježená lies approximately 10 kilometres (6 mi) west of Jihlava and 106 km (66 mi) south-east of Prague.

== Demographics ==
Historical population
Year	Pop.	±%
1869	223	—
1880	223	+0.0%
1890	238	+6.7%
1900	232	−2.5%
1910	218	−6.0%
1921	219	+0.5%
1930	246	+12.3%
1950	158	−35.8%
1961	160	+1.3%
1970	132	−17.5%
1980	107	−18.9%
1991	100	−6.5%
2001	104	+4.0%
2011	123	+18.3%
2021	112	−8.9%
Source: Censuses
