= Dobroutov =

- Municipality
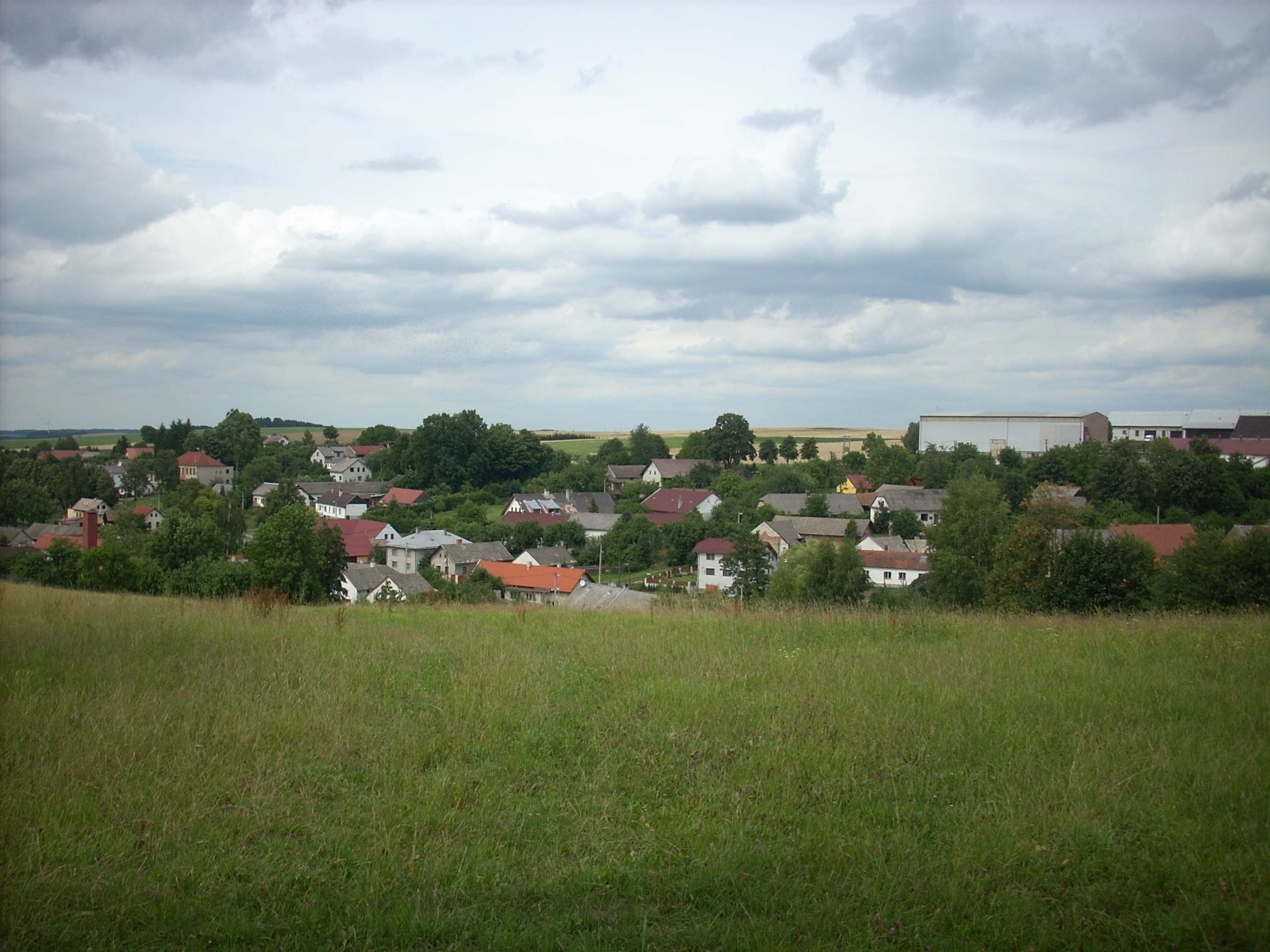
- General view

- Location in the Czech Republic
- Coordinates: 49°27′44″N 15°44′11″E
- Country: Czech Republic
- Region: Vysočina
- District: Jihlava
- First mentioned: 1356

Area
  - Total: 10.11 km^{2} (3.90 sq mi)
- Elevation: 517 m (1,696 ft)

Population (2026-01-01)
  - Total: 310
  - Density: 31/km^{2} (79/sq mi)
- Time zone: UTC+1 (CET)
  - Summer (DST): UTC+2 (CEST)
- Postal code: 588 13
- Website: www.dobroutov.cz

Dobroutov (Czech pronunciation: [ˈdobroutof]) is a municipality and village in Jihlava District in the Vysočina Region of the Czech Republic. It has about 300 inhabitants.

Dobroutov lies approximately 14 kilometres (9 mi) north-east of Jihlava and 119 km (74 mi) south-east of Prague.

== Demographics ==
Historical population
Year	Pop.	±%
1869	506	—
1880	517	+2.2%
1890	500	−3.3%
1900	472	−5.6%
1910	469	−0.6%
1921	467	−0.4%
1930	470	+0.6%
1950	353	−24.9%
1961	303	−14.2%
1970	267	−11.9%
1980	246	−7.9%
1991	216	−12.2%
2001	234	+8.3%
2011	257	+9.8%
2021	282	+9.7%
Source: Censuses
