= Vílanec =

- Municipality
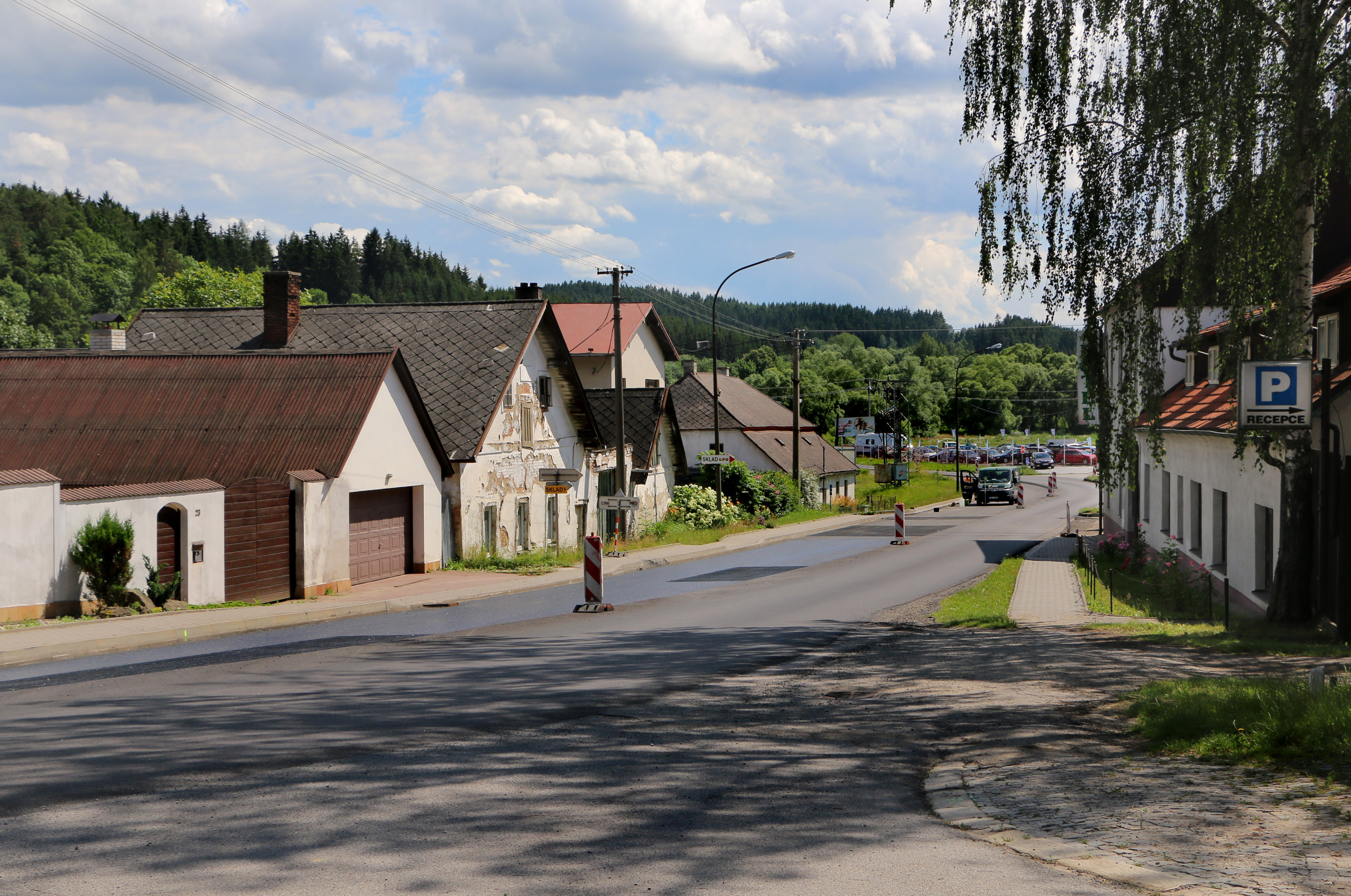
- Centre of Vílanec

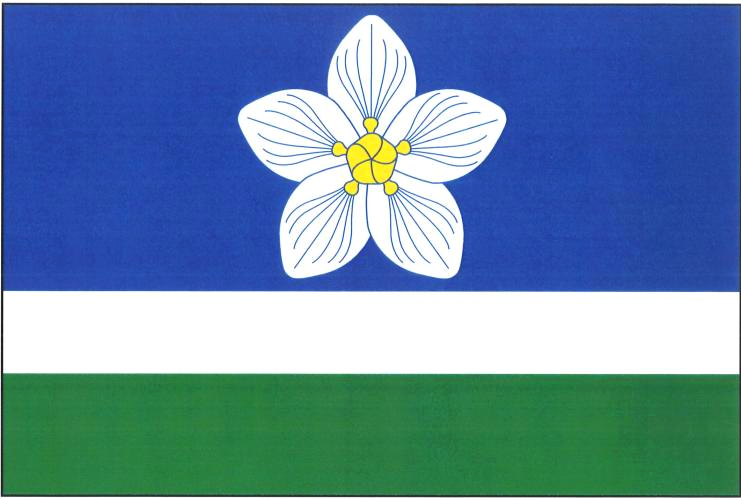
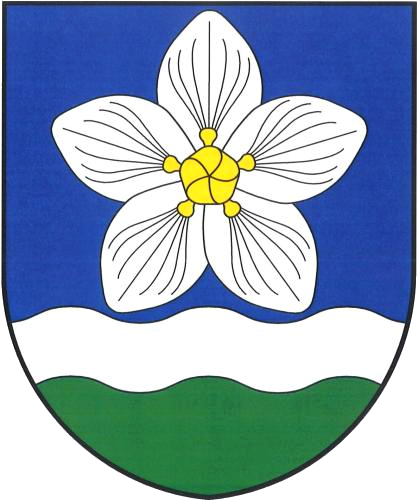
- Flag Coat of arms

- Location in the Czech Republic
- Coordinates: 49°20′4″N 15°34′36″E
- Country: Czech Republic
- Region: Vysočina
- District: Jihlava
- First mentioned: 1327

Area
  - Total: 13.58 km^{2} (5.24 sq mi)
- Elevation: 535 m (1,755 ft)

Population (2026-01-01)
  - Total: 318
  - Density: 23.4/km^{2} (60.6/sq mi)
- Time zone: UTC+1 (CET)
  - Summer (DST): UTC+2 (CEST)
- Postal codes: 588 33, 588 35
- Website: www.obec-vilanec.cz

Vílanec (Czech pronunciation: [ˈviːlanɛts]) is a municipality and village in Jihlava District in the Vysočina Region of the Czech Republic. It has about 300 inhabitants.

Vílanec lies approximately 7 kilometres (4 mi) south-west of Jihlava and 117 km (73 mi) south-east of Prague.

== Administrative division ==
Vílanec consists of two municipal parts (in brackets population according to the 2021 census):

- Vílanec (249)
- Loučky (55)

== Demographics ==
Historical population
Year	Pop.	±%
1869	441	—
1880	499	+13.2%
1890	548	+9.8%
1900	450	−17.9%
1910	420	−6.7%
1921	393	−6.4%
1930	380	−3.3%
1950	310	−18.4%
1961	299	−3.5%
1970	227	−24.1%
1980	203	−10.6%
1991	219	+7.9%
2001	259	+18.3%
2011	295	+13.9%
2021	304	+3.1%
Source: Censuses
