= Zhoř (Jihlava District) =

- Municipality
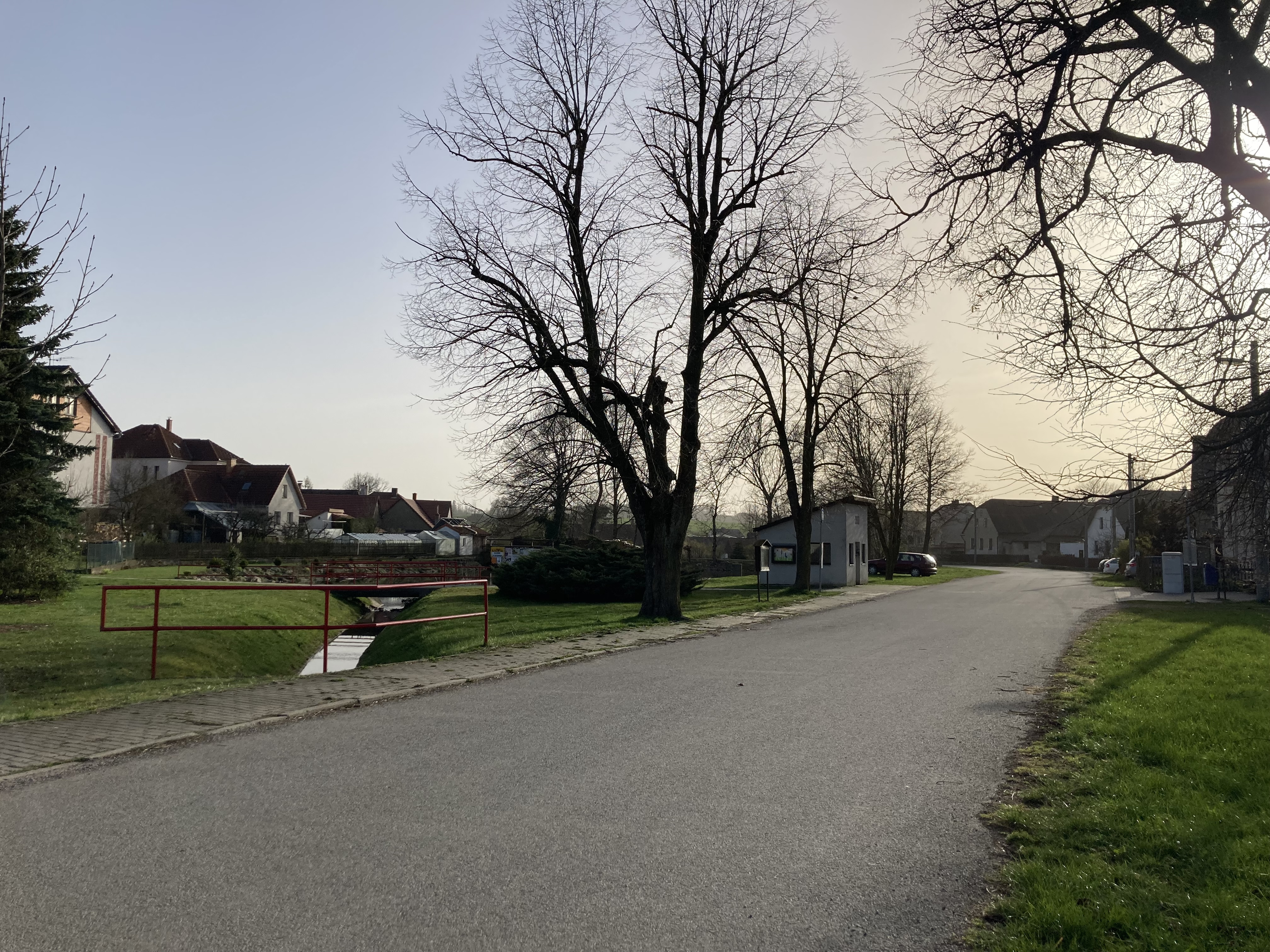
- Centre of Zhoř

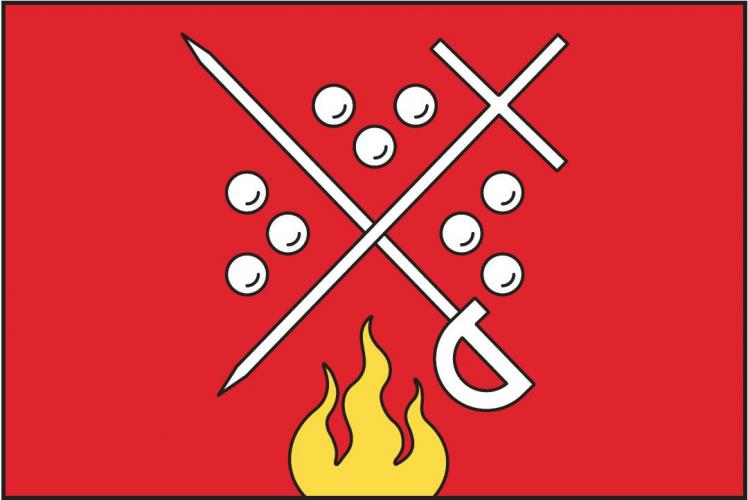
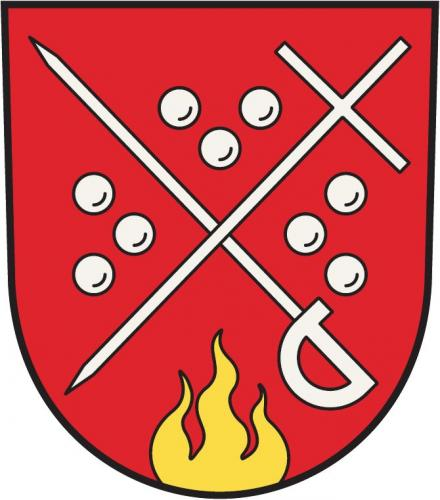
- Flag Coat of arms

- Location in the Czech Republic
- Coordinates: 49°26′34″N 15°46′17″E
- Country: Czech Republic
- Region: Vysočina
- District: Jihlava
- First mentioned: 1339

Area
  - Total: 5.81 km^{2} (2.24 sq mi)
- Elevation: 560 m (1,840 ft)

Population (2026-01-01)
  - Total: 479
  - Density: 82.4/km^{2} (214/sq mi)
- Time zone: UTC+1 (CET)
  - Summer (DST): UTC+2 (CEST)
- Postal code: 588 26
- Website: www.zhor.cz

Zhoř (Czech pronunciation: [zɦor̝̊]) is a municipality and village in Jihlava District in the Vysočina Region of the Czech Republic. It has about 500 inhabitants.

Zhoř lies approximately 14 kilometres (9 mi) east of Jihlava and 121 km (75 mi) south-east of Prague.

== Demographics ==
Historical population
Year	Pop.	±%
1869	368	—
1880	373	+1.4%
1890	386	+3.5%
1900	360	−6.7%
1910	380	+5.6%
1921	369	−2.9%
1930	365	−1.1%
1950	369	+1.1%
1961	358	−3.0%
1970	336	−6.1%
1980	350	+4.2%
1991	381	+8.9%
2001	385	+1.0%
2011	469	+21.8%
2021	426	−9.2%
Source: Censuses
