= Stáj =

- Municipality
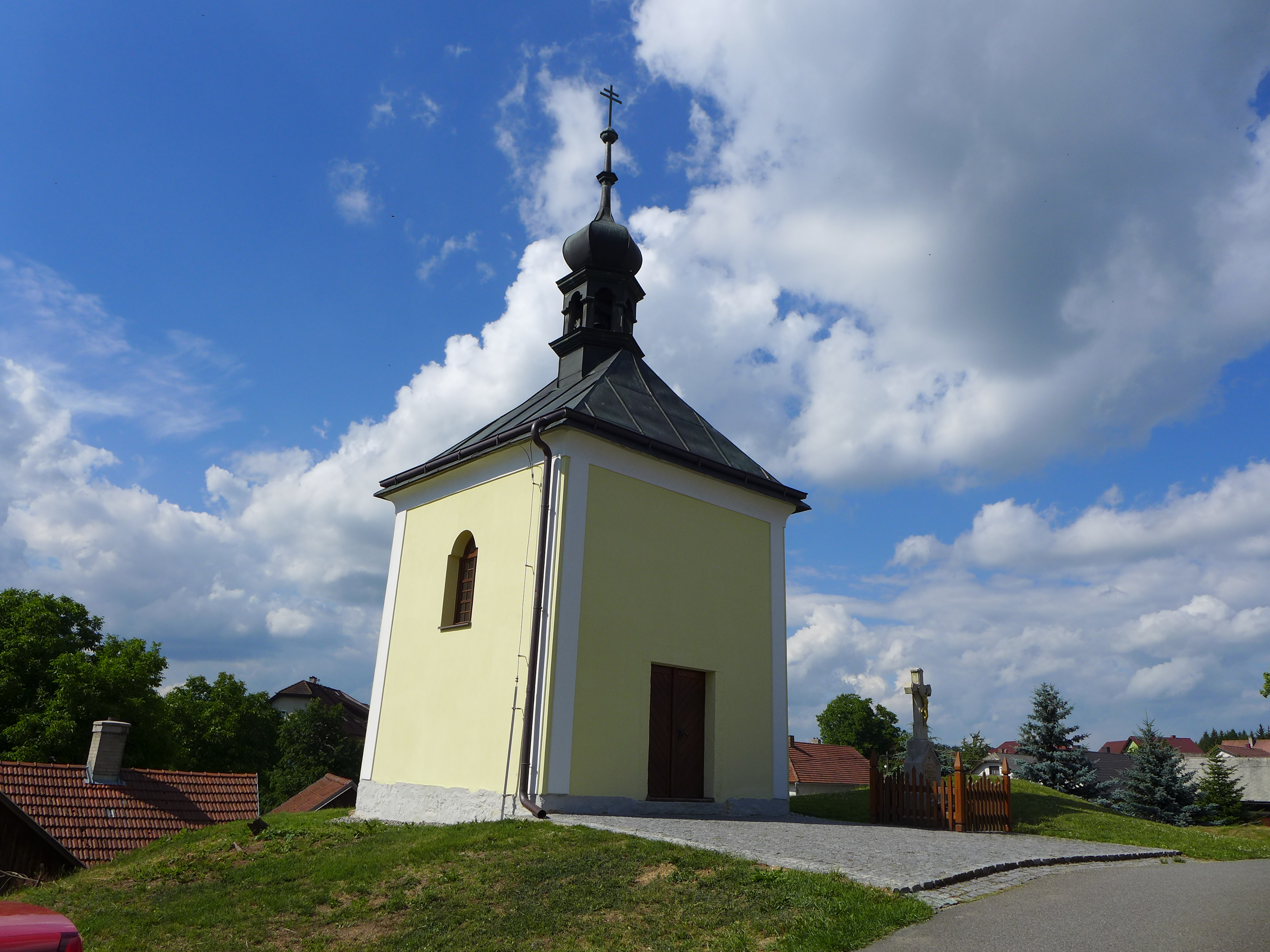
- Chapel of Saint John of Nepomuk

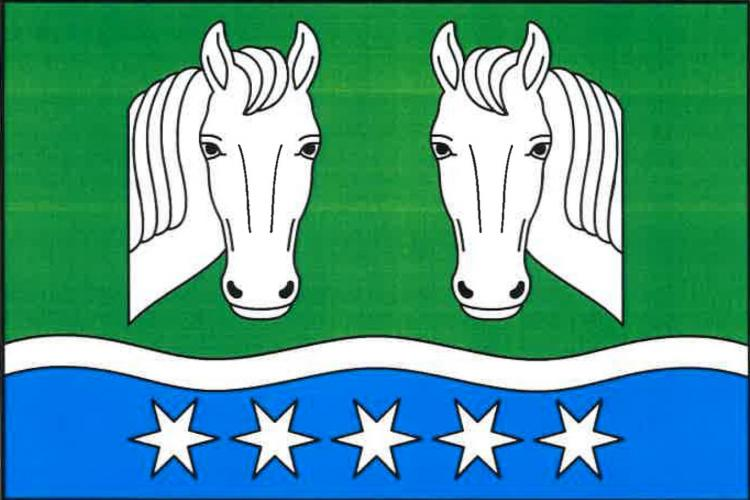
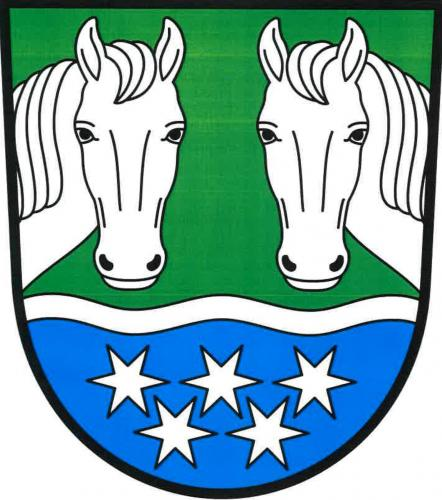
- Flag Coat of arms

- Location in the Czech Republic
- Coordinates: 49°27′29″N 15°48′12″E
- Country: Czech Republic
- Region: Vysočina
- District: Jihlava
- First mentioned: 1298

Area
  - Total: 5.93 km^{2} (2.29 sq mi)
- Elevation: 602 m (1,975 ft)

Population (2026-01-01)
  - Total: 185
  - Density: 31.2/km^{2} (80.8/sq mi)
- Time zone: UTC+1 (CET)
  - Summer (DST): UTC+2 (CEST)
- Postal code: 588 27
- Website: obecstaj.cz

Stáj (Czech pronunciation: [ˈstaːj]) is a municipality and village in Jihlava District in the Vysočina Region of the Czech Republic. It has about 200 inhabitants.

Stáj lies approximately 18 kilometres (11 mi) north-east of Jihlava and 122 km (76 mi) south-east of Prague.

== Demographics ==
Historical population
Year	Pop.	±%
1869	273	—
1880	314	+15.0%
1890	304	−3.2%
1900	279	−8.2%
1910	285	+2.2%
1921	287	+0.7%
1930	326	+13.6%
1950	206	−36.8%
1961	202	−1.9%
1970	200	−1.0%
1980	174	−13.0%
1991	195	+12.1%
2001	184	−5.6%
2011	171	−7.1%
2021	167	−2.3%
Source: Censuses
