= Brzkov =

- Municipality
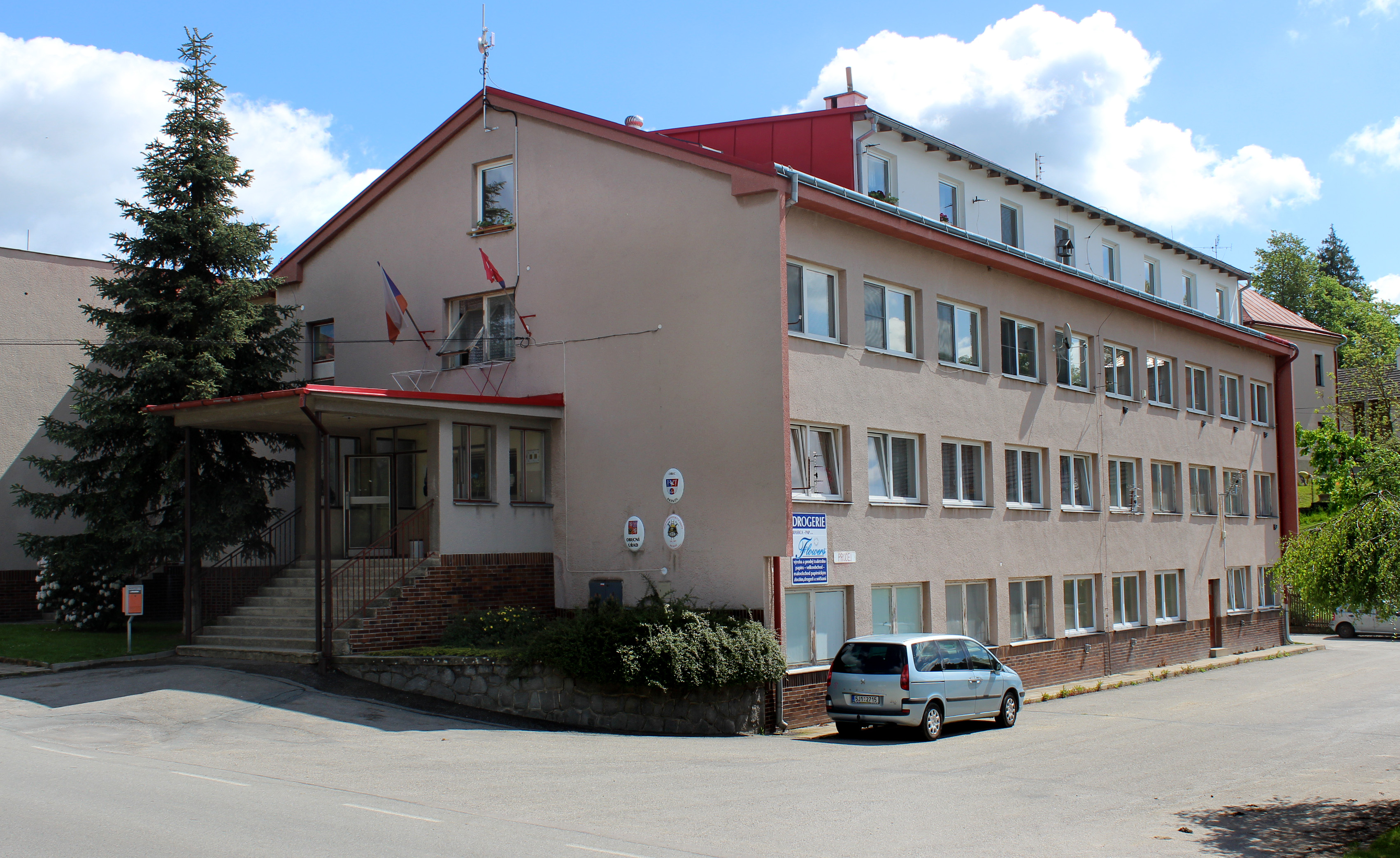
- Municipal office

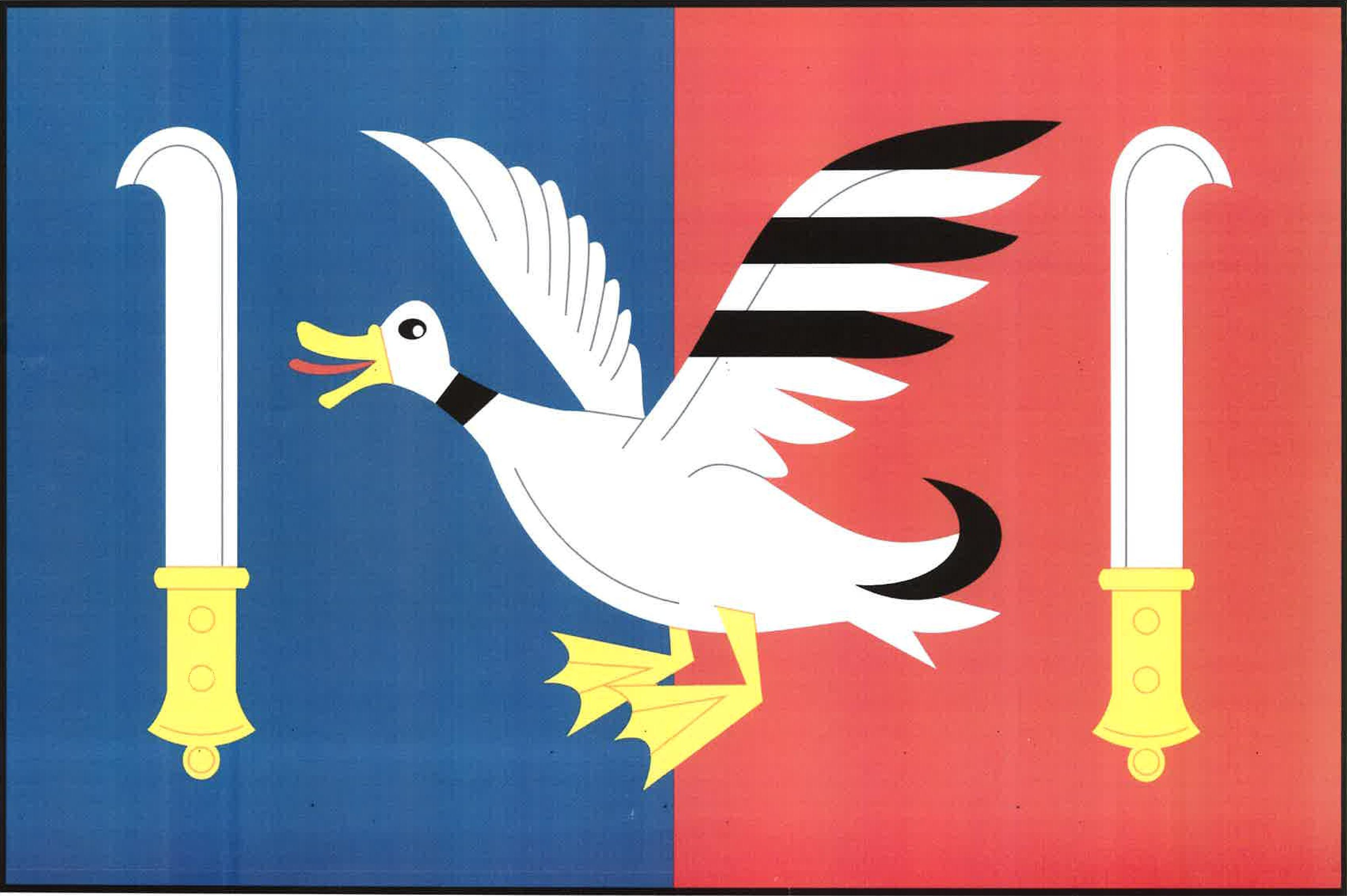
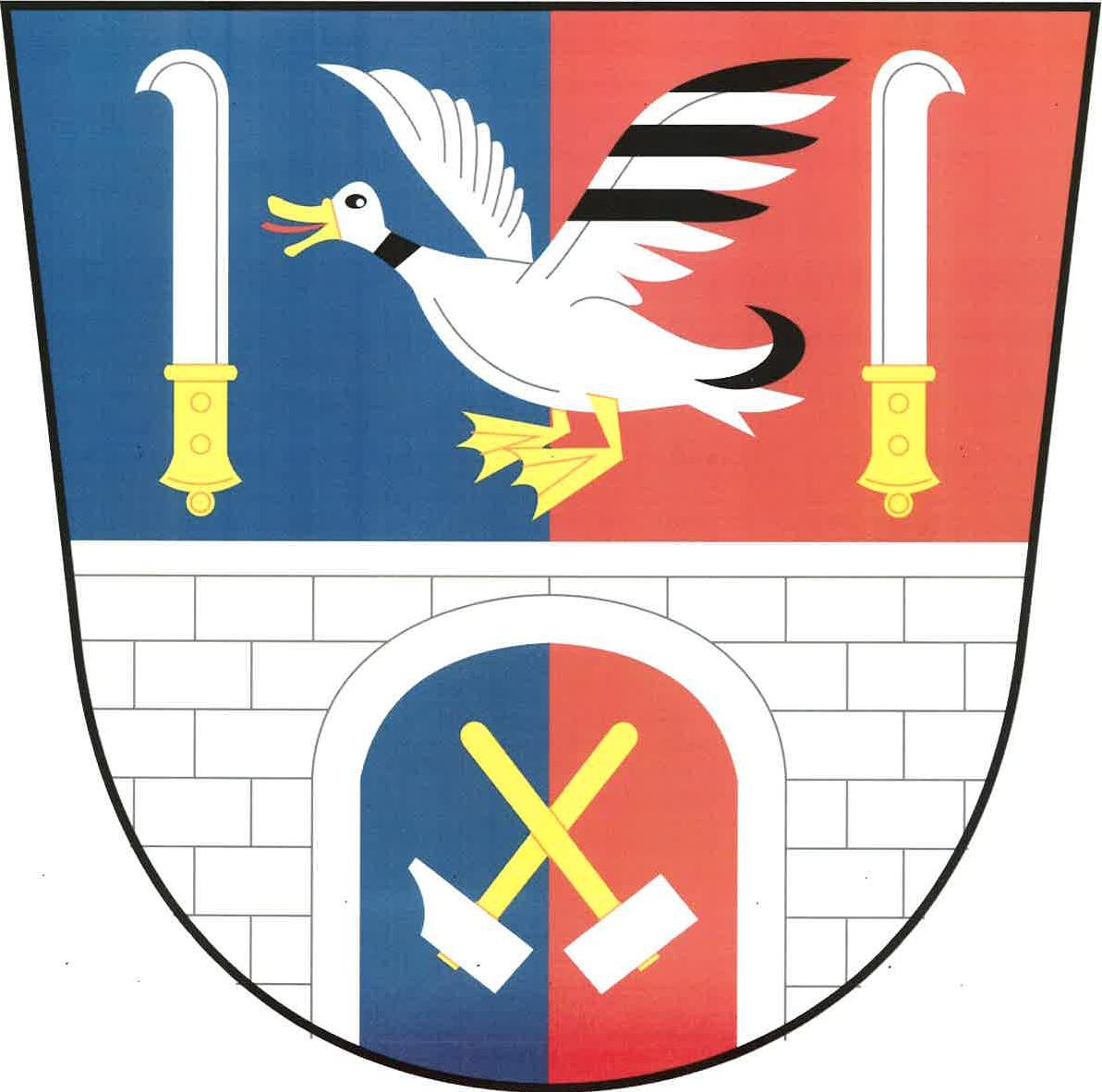
- Flag Coat of arms

- Location in the Czech Republic
- Coordinates: 49°31′34″N 15°43′38″E
- Country: Czech Republic
- Region: Vysočina
- District: Jihlava
- First mentioned: 1319

Area
  - Total: 7.79 km^{2} (3.01 sq mi)
- Elevation: 485 m (1,591 ft)

Population (2026-01-01)
  - Total: 366
  - Density: 47.0/km^{2} (122/sq mi)
- Time zone: UTC+1 (CET)
  - Summer (DST): UTC+2 (CEST)
- Postal code: 588 13
- Website: www.brzkov.cz

Brzkov (Czech pronunciation: [ˈbr̩skof]) is a municipality and village in Jihlava District in the Vysočina Region of the Czech Republic. It has about 400 inhabitants.

Brzkov lies approximately 18 kilometres (11 mi) north-east of Jihlava and 114 km (71 mi) south-east of Prague.

== Demographics ==
Historical population
Year	Pop.	±%
1869	352	—
1880	338	−4.0%
1890	325	−3.8%
1900	322	−0.9%
1910	347	+7.8%
1921	338	−2.6%
1930	323	−4.4%
1950	233	−27.9%
1961	227	−2.6%
1970	248	+9.3%
1980	247	−0.4%
1991	242	−2.0%
2001	254	+5.0%
2011	282	+11.0%
2021	304	+7.8%
Source: Censuses
