= Milíčov =

- Municipality
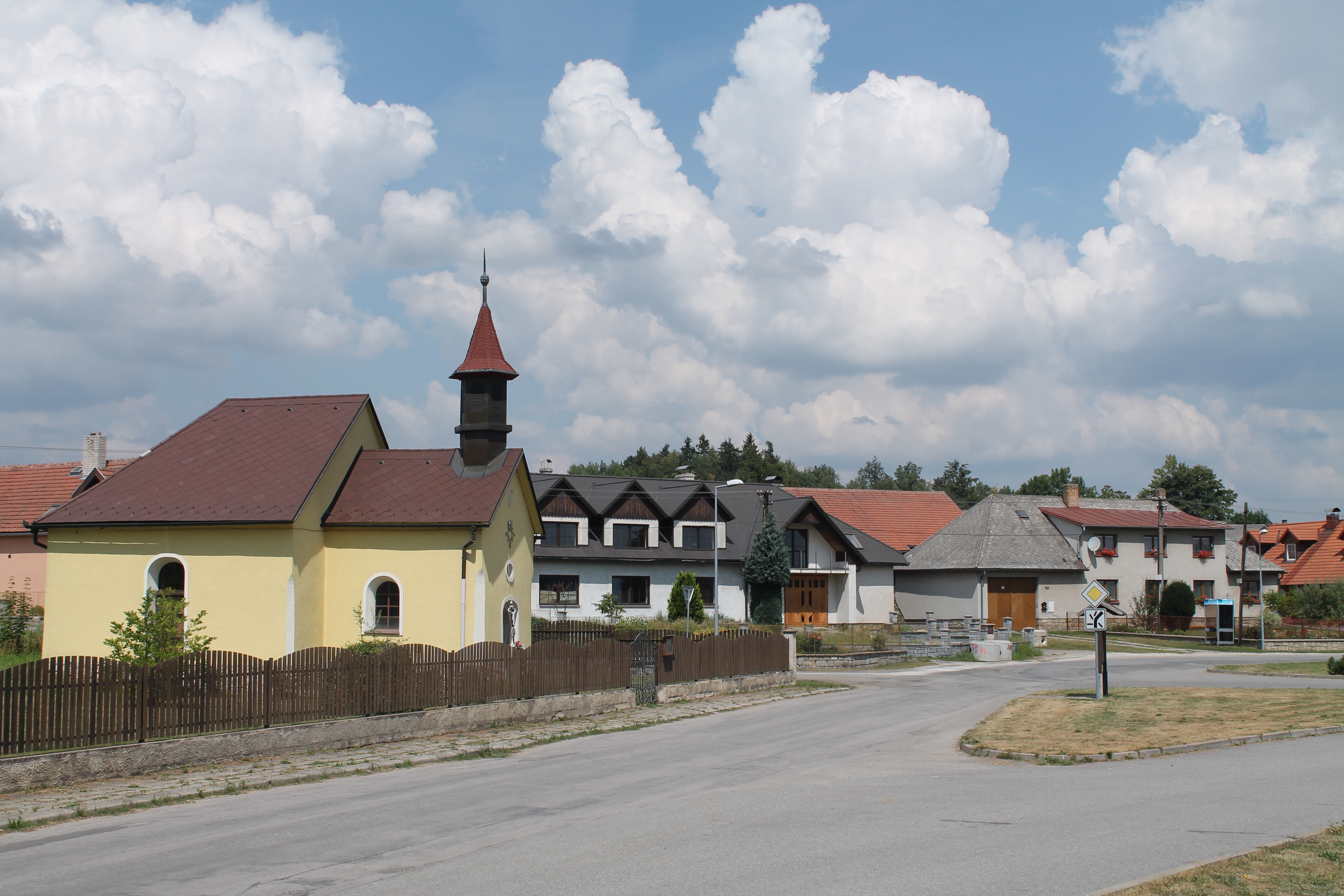
- Centre of Milíčov

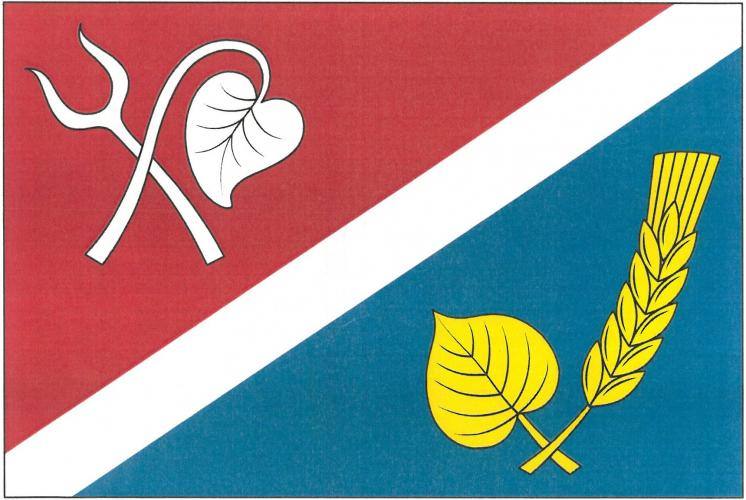
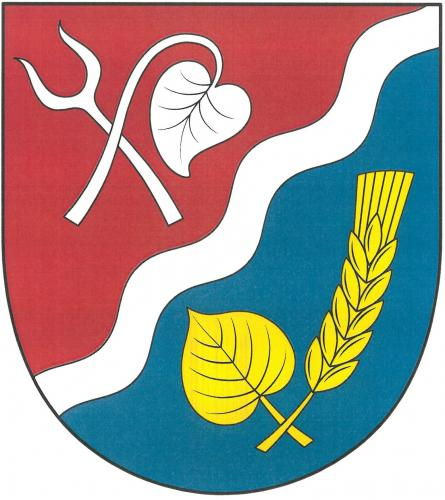
- Flag Coat of arms

- Location in the Czech Republic
- Coordinates: 49°23′44″N 15°23′35″E
- Country: Czech Republic
- Region: Vysočina
- District: Jihlava
- First mentioned: 1379

Area
  - Total: 6.53 km^{2} (2.52 sq mi)
- Elevation: 667 m (2,188 ft)

Population (2026-01-01)
  - Total: 136
  - Density: 20.8/km^{2} (53.9/sq mi)
- Time zone: UTC+1 (CET)
  - Summer (DST): UTC+2 (CEST)
- Postal code: 588 05
- Website: www.milicov.eu

Milíčov (Czech pronunciation: [ˈmɪliːtʃof]) is a municipality and village in Jihlava District in the Vysočina Region of the Czech Republic. It has about 100 inhabitants.

Milíčov lies approximately 14 kilometres (9 mi) west of Jihlava and 104 km (65 mi) south-east of Prague.

== Demographics ==
Historical population
Year	Pop.	±%
1869	378	—
1880	411	+8.7%
1890	373	−9.2%
1900	348	−6.7%
1910	373	+7.2%
1921	385	+3.2%
1930	354	−8.1%
1950	259	−26.8%
1961	250	−3.5%
1970	237	−5.2%
1980	185	−21.9%
1991	149	−19.5%
2001	130	−12.8%
2011	129	−0.8%
2021	138	+7.0%
Source: Censuses
