= Kamenná (Jihlava District) =

- Municipality
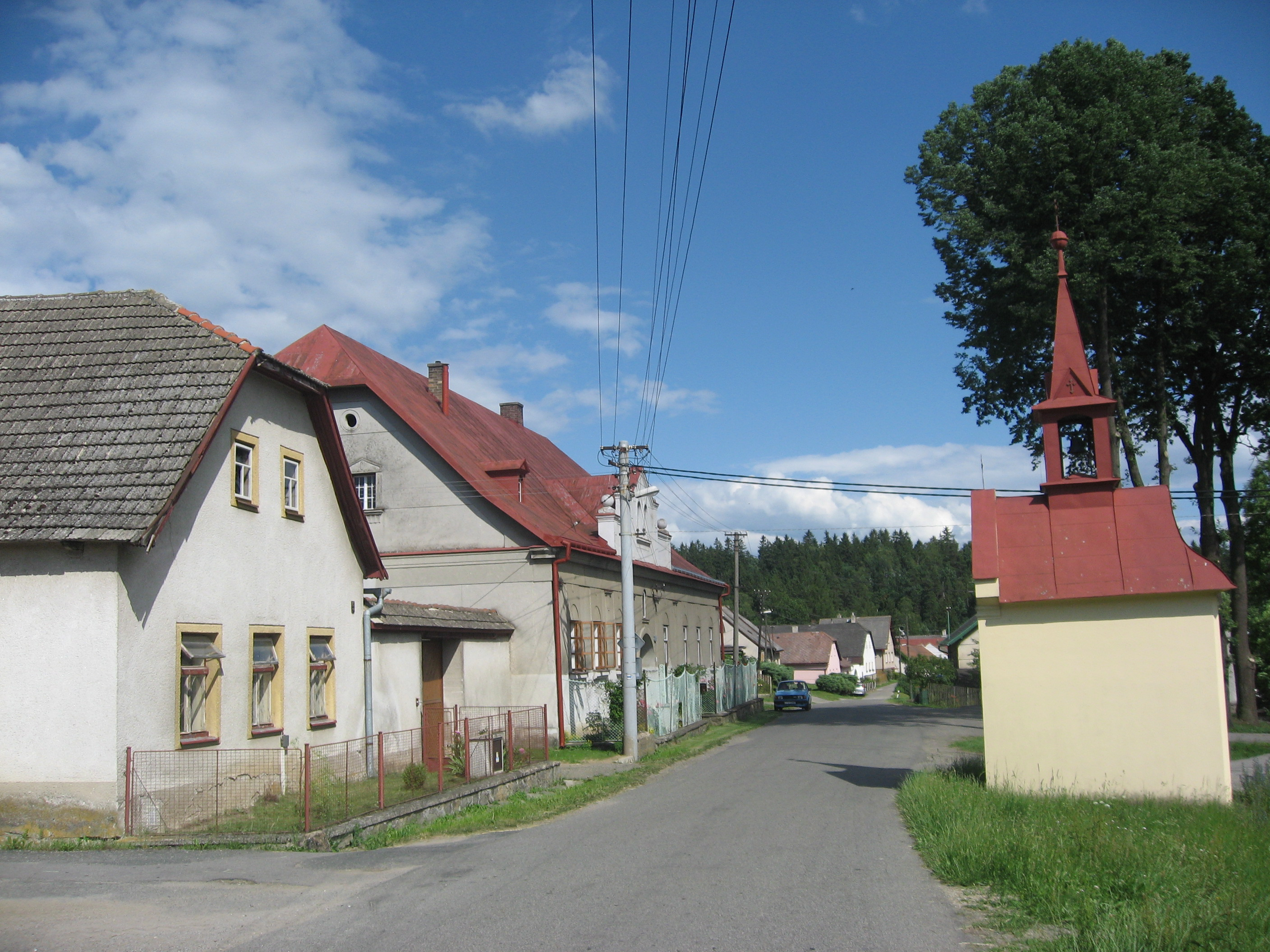
- Main street

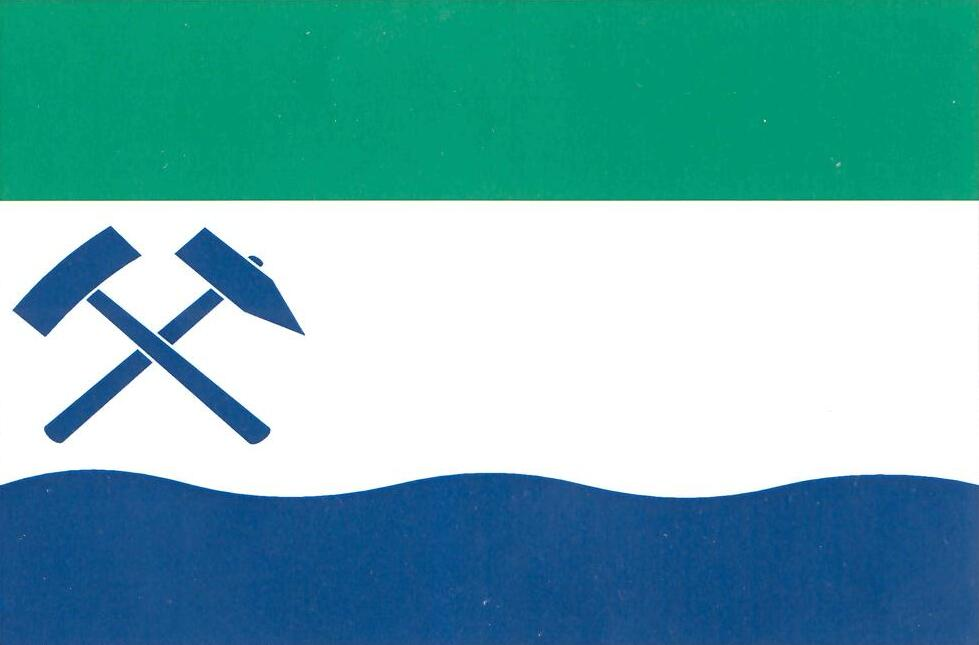
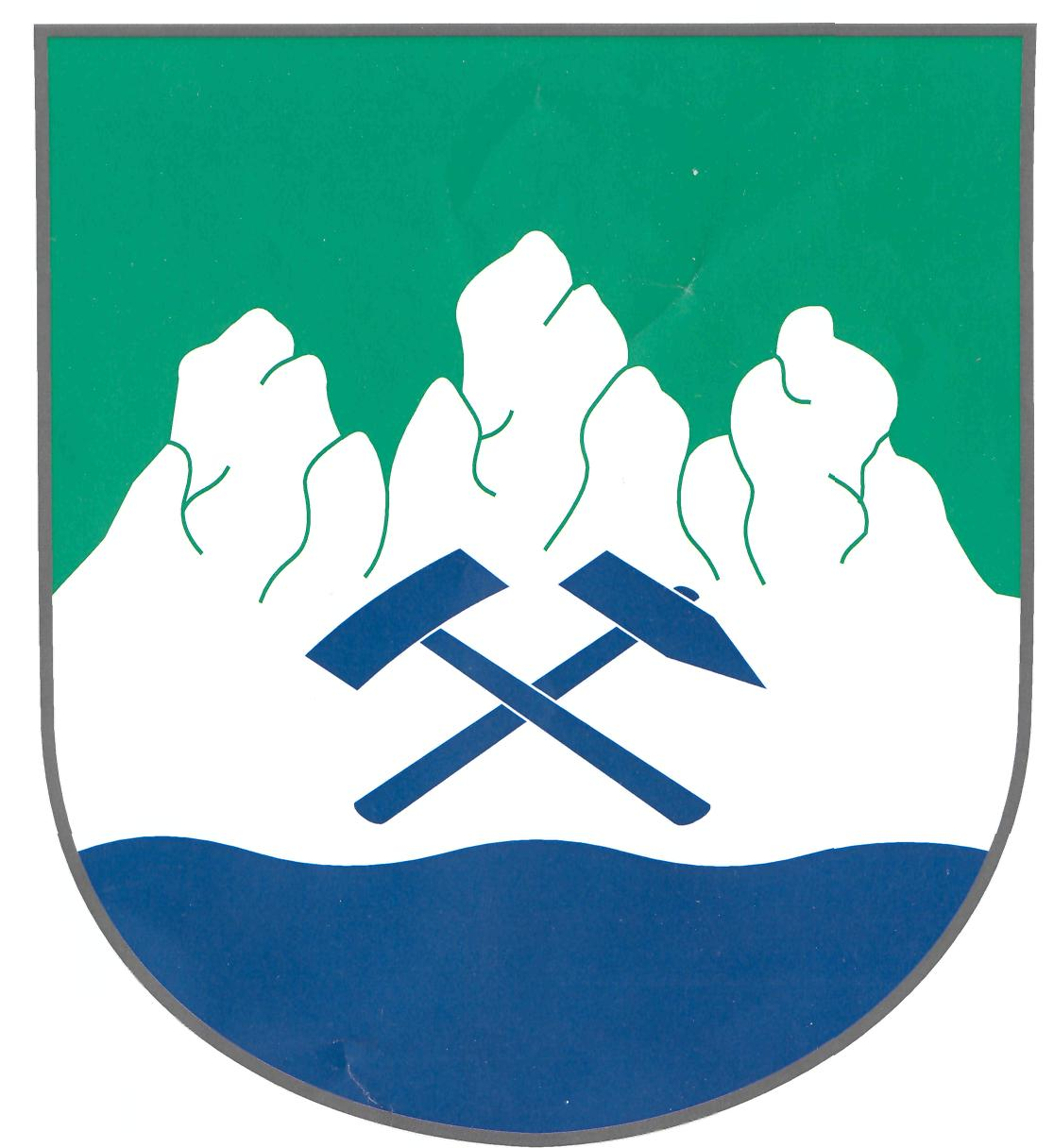
- Flag Coat of arms

- Location in the Czech Republic
- Coordinates: 49°30′36″N 15°39′9″E
- Country: Czech Republic
- Region: Vysočina
- District: Jihlava
- First mentioned: 1308

Area
  - Total: 6.33 km^{2} (2.44 sq mi)
- Elevation: 460 m (1,510 ft)

Population (2026-01-01)
  - Total: 191
  - Density: 30.2/km^{2} (78.1/sq mi)
- Time zone: UTC+1 (CET)
  - Summer (DST): UTC+2 (CEST)
- Postal code: 588 13
- Website: www.kamenna.cz

Kamenná (Czech pronunciation: [ˈkamɛnaː]; German: Bergersdorf) is a municipality and village in Jihlava District in the Vysočina Region of the Czech Republic. It has about 200 inhabitants.

== History ==
The first written mention of Kamenná is from 1308.

== Demographics ==
Historical population
| Year | Pop. | ±% |
|---|---|---|
| 1869 | 296 | — |
| 1880 | 296 | +0.0% |
| 1890 | 313 | +5.7% |
| 1900 | 320 | +2.2% |
| 1910 | 317 | −0.9% |
| 1921 | 313 | −1.3% |
| 1930 | 341 | +8.9% |
| 1950 | 251 | −26.4% |
| 1961 | 252 | +0.4% |
| 1970 | 229 | −9.1% |
| 1980 | 225 | −1.7% |
| 1991 | 186 | −17.3% |
| 2001 | 182 | −2.2% |
| 2011 | 181 | −0.5% |
| 2021 | 173 | −4.4% |
Source: Censuses
