= Záborná =

- Municipality
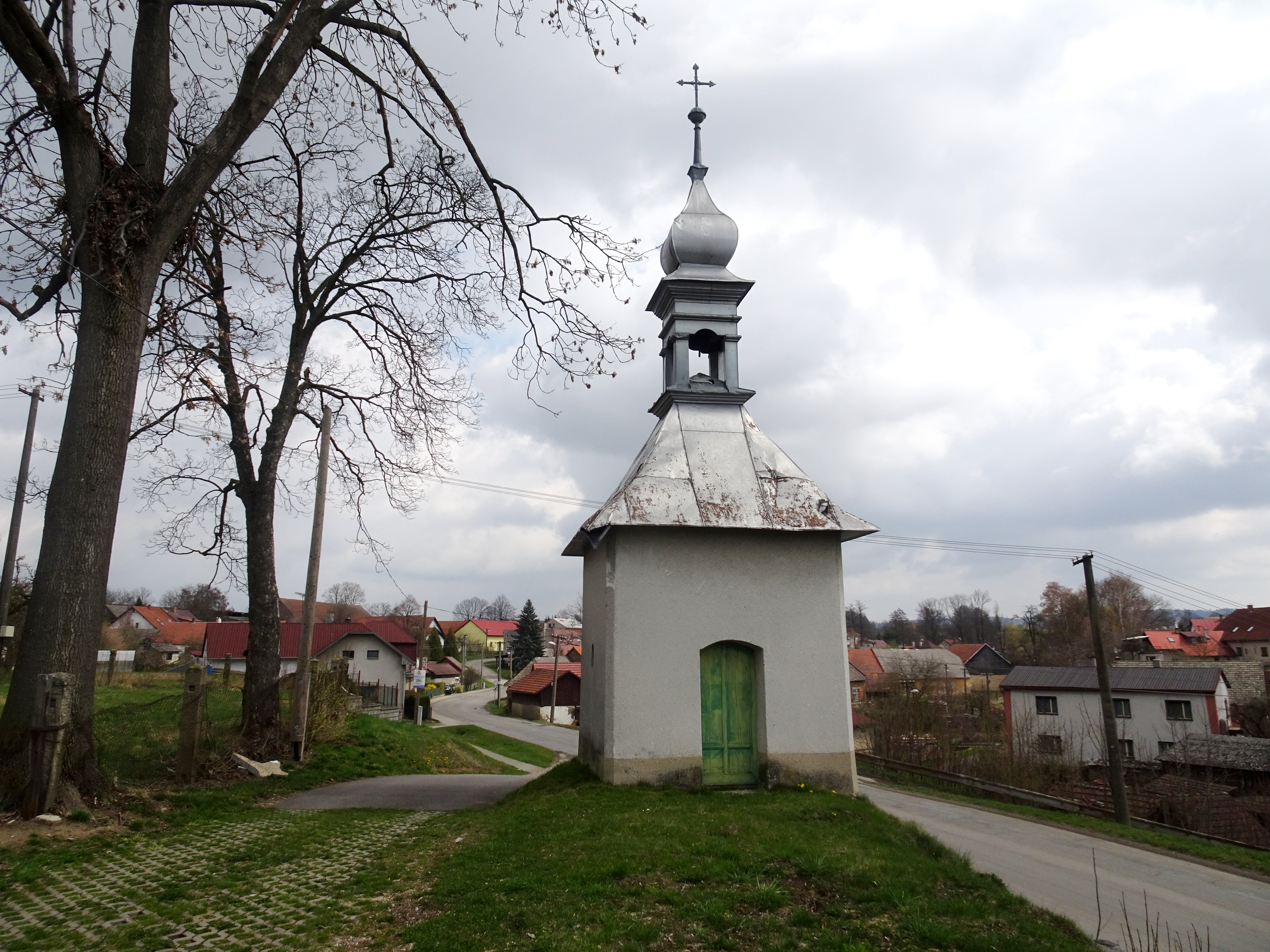
- Chapel of Our Lady of Sorrows

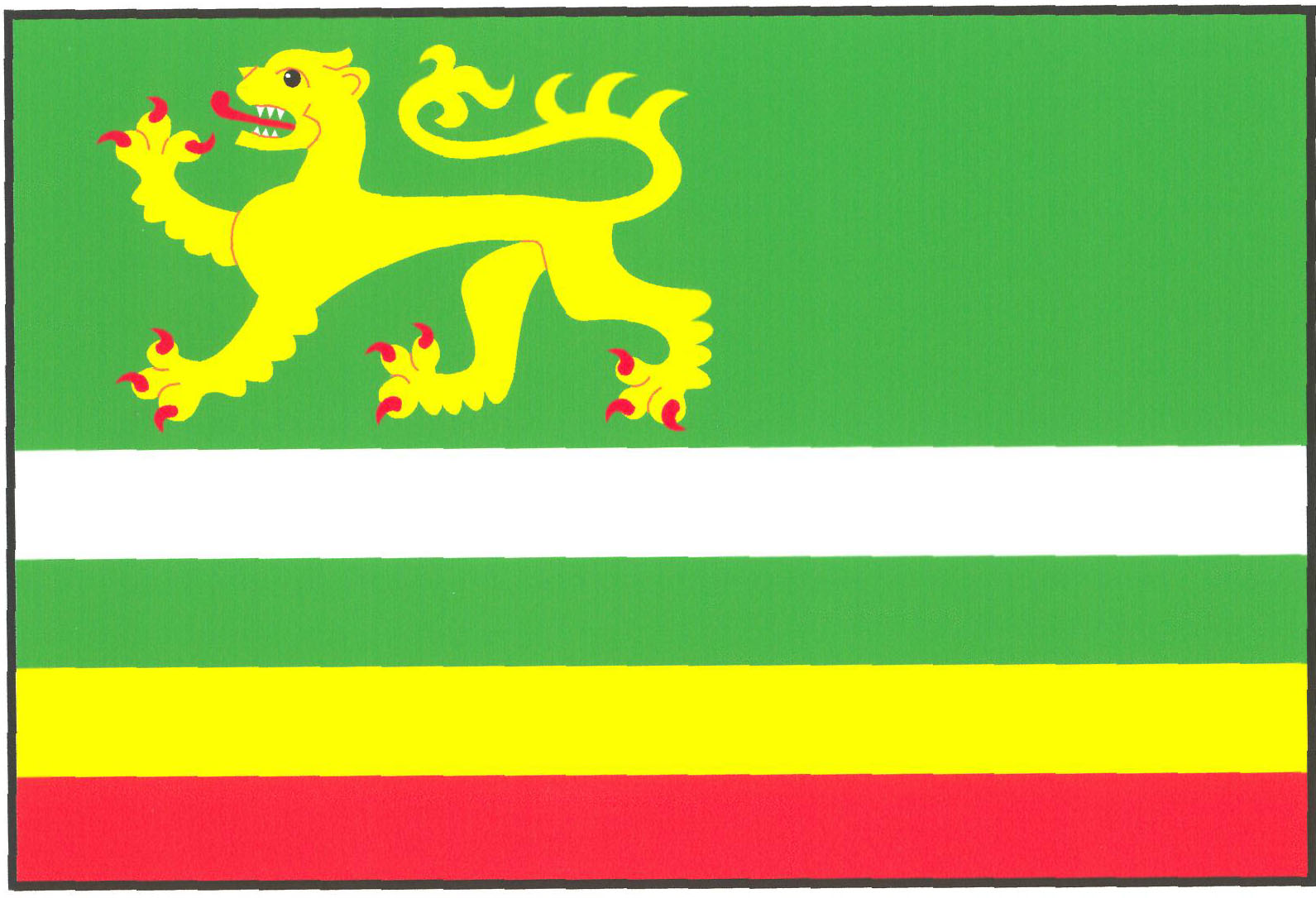
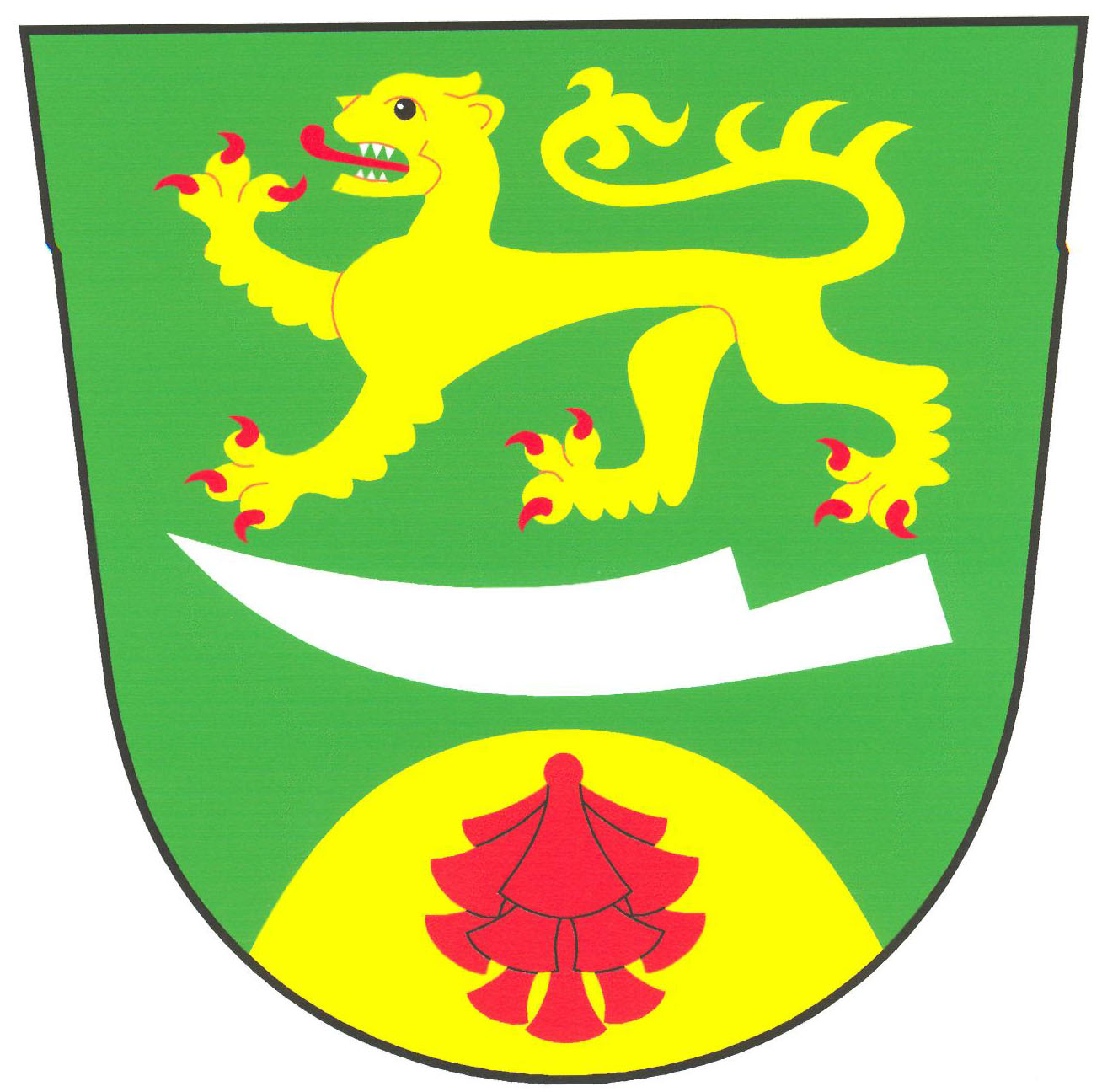
- Flag Coat of arms

- Location in the Czech Republic
- Coordinates: 49°49′12″N 15°45′25″E
- Country: Czech Republic
- Region: Vysočina
- District: Jihlava
- First mentioned: 1282

Area
  - Total: 6.45 km^{2} (2.49 sq mi)
- Elevation: 527 m (1,729 ft)

Population (2026-01-01)
  - Total: 246
  - Density: 38.1/km^{2} (98.8/sq mi)
- Time zone: UTC+1 (CET)
  - Summer (DST): UTC+2 (CEST)
- Postal code: 588 13
- Website: www.zaborna.cz

Záborná (Czech pronunciation: [ˈzaːbornaː]) is a municipality and village in Jihlava District in the Vysočina Region of the Czech Republic. It has about 200 inhabitants.

Záborná lies approximately 16 kilometres (10 mi) north-east of Jihlava and 118 km (73 mi) south-east of Prague.

== Demographics ==
Historical population
Year	Pop.	±%
1869	319	—
1880	380	+19.1%
1890	338	−11.1%
1900	333	−1.5%
1910	344	+3.3%
1921	374	+8.7%
1930	327	−12.6%
1950	269	−17.7%
1961	269	+0.0%
1970	254	−5.6%
1980	237	−6.7%
1991	210	−11.4%
2001	210	+0.0%
2011	232	+10.5%
2021	254	+9.5%
Source: Censuses
