= Hybrálec =

- Municipality
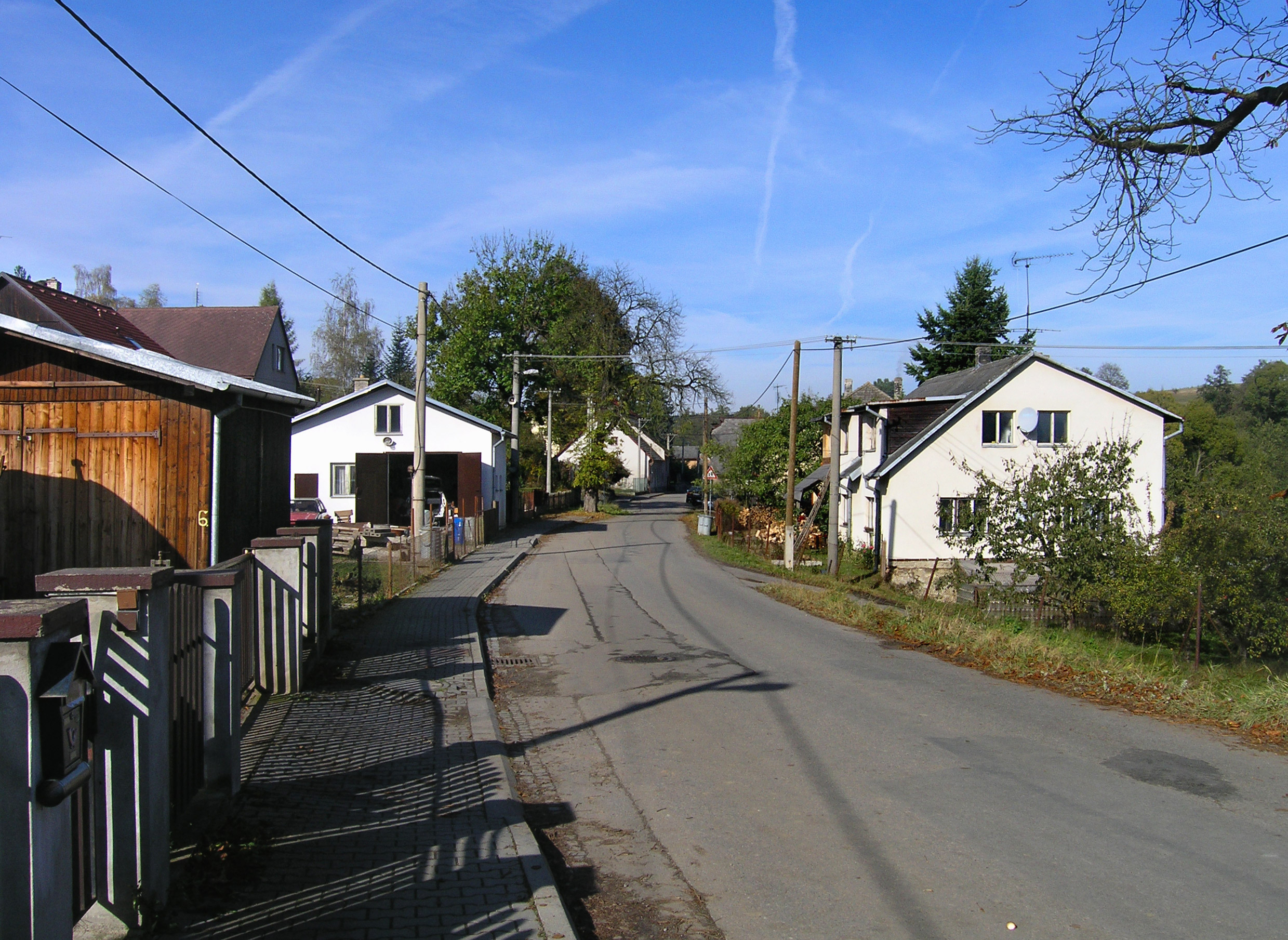
- Southern part of Hybrálec

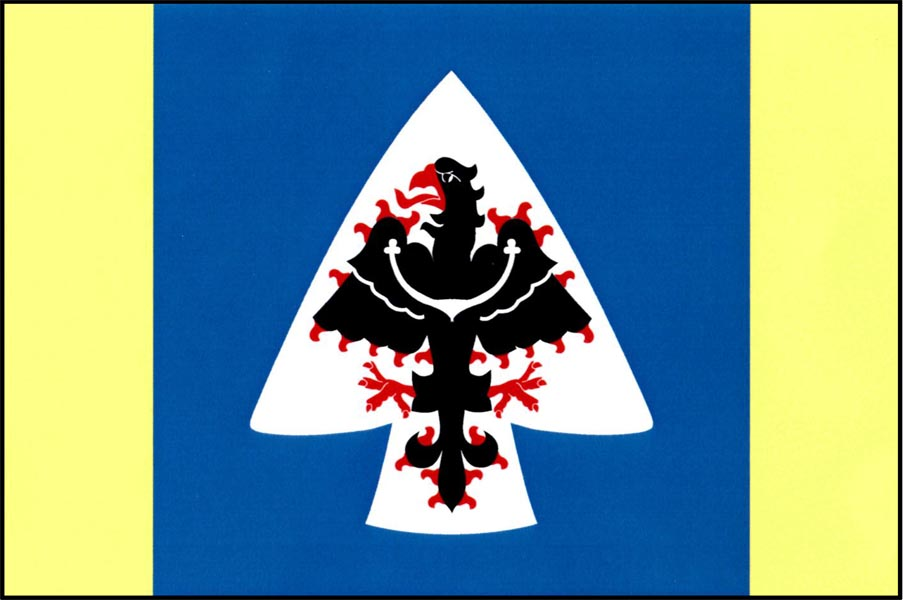
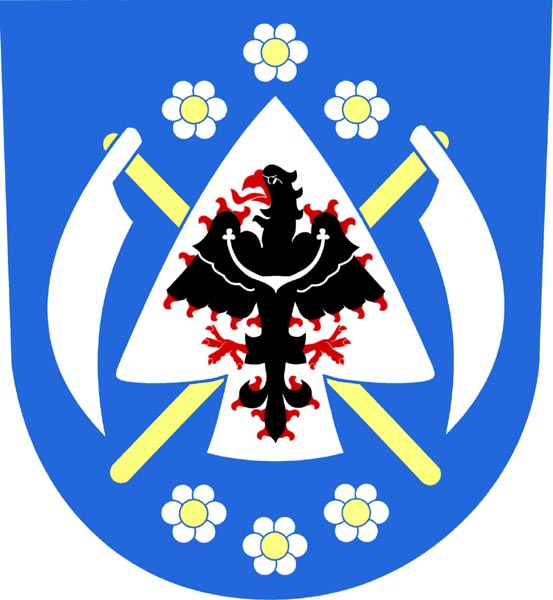
- Flag Coat of arms

- Location in the Czech Republic
- Coordinates: 49°25′40″N 15°33′34″E
- Country: Czech Republic
- Region: Vysočina
- District: Jihlava
- First mentioned: 1315

Area
  - Total: 10.50 km^{2} (4.05 sq mi)
- Elevation: 510 m (1,670 ft)

Population (2026-01-01)
  - Total: 486
  - Density: 46.3/km^{2} (120/sq mi)
- Time zone: UTC+1 (CET)
  - Summer (DST): UTC+2 (CEST)
- Postal code: 586 01
- Website: www.hybralec.cz

Hybrálec (Czech pronunciation: [ˈɦɪbraːlɛts]) is a municipality and village in Jihlava District in the Vysočina Region of the Czech Republic. It has about 500 inhabitants.

Hybrálec lies approximately 6 kilometres (4 mi) north-west of Jihlava and 109 km (68 mi) south-east of Prague.

== Demographics ==
Historical population
Year	Pop.	±%
1869	594	—
1880	571	−3.9%
1890	595	+4.2%
1900	676	+13.6%
1910	674	−0.3%
1921	665	−1.3%
1930	588	−11.6%
1950	400	−32.0%
1961	430	+7.5%
1970	391	−9.1%
1980	327	−16.4%
1991	323	−1.2%
2001	361	+11.8%
2011	408	+13.0%
2021	474	+16.2%
Source: Censuses
