= Kalhov =

- Municipality
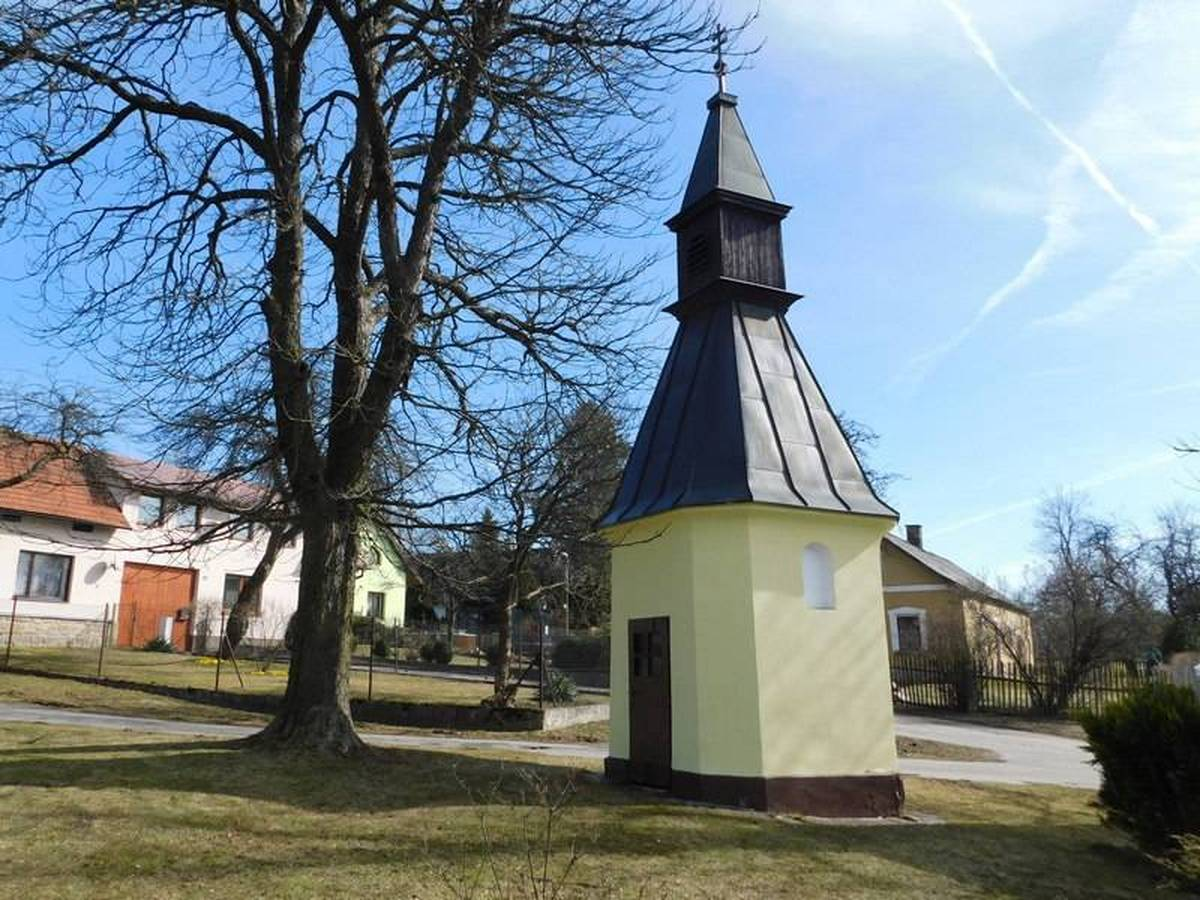
- Chapel in Kalhov

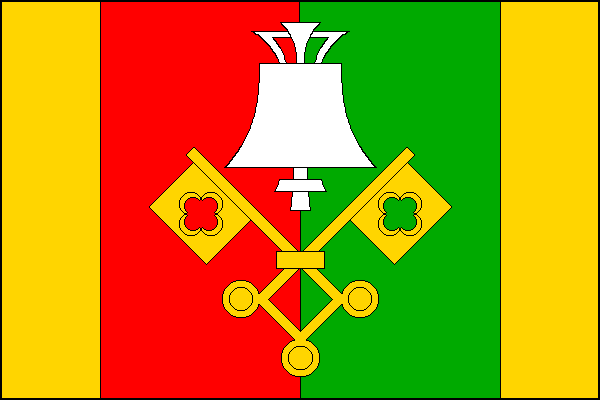
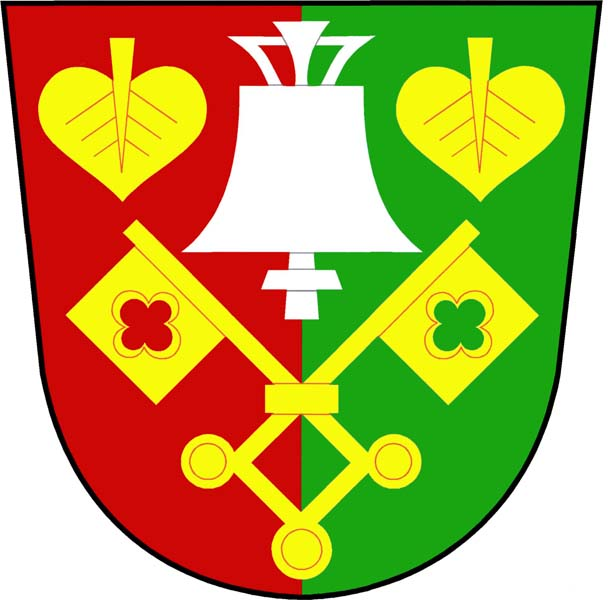
- Flag Coat of arms

- Location in the Czech Republic
- Coordinates: 49°28′52″N 15°26′29″E
- Country: Czech Republic
- Region: Vysočina
- District: Jihlava
- First mentioned: 1226

Area
  - Total: 4.86 km^{2} (1.88 sq mi)
- Elevation: 660 m (2,170 ft)

Population (2026-01-01)
  - Total: 123
  - Density: 25.3/km^{2} (65.5/sq mi)
- Time zone: UTC+1 (CET)
  - Summer (DST): UTC+2 (CEST)
- Postal code: 588 42
- Website: obeckalhov.estranky.cz

Kalhov (Czech pronunciation: [ˈkalɦof]) is a municipality and village in Jihlava District in the Vysočina Region of the Czech Republic. It has about 100 inhabitants.

Kalhov lies approximately 15 kilometres (9 mi) north-west of Jihlava and 100 km (62 mi) south-east of Prague.

== Demographics ==
Historical population
Year	Pop.	±%
1869	229	—
1880	270	+17.9%
1890	251	−7.0%
1900	238	−5.2%
1910	254	+6.7%
1921	214	−15.7%
1930	213	−0.5%
1950	170	−20.2%
1961	172	+1.2%
1970	159	−7.6%
1980	148	−6.9%
1991	123	−16.9%
2001	117	−4.9%
2011	128	+9.4%
2021	120	−6.2%
Source: Censuses
