= Rančířov =

- Municipality
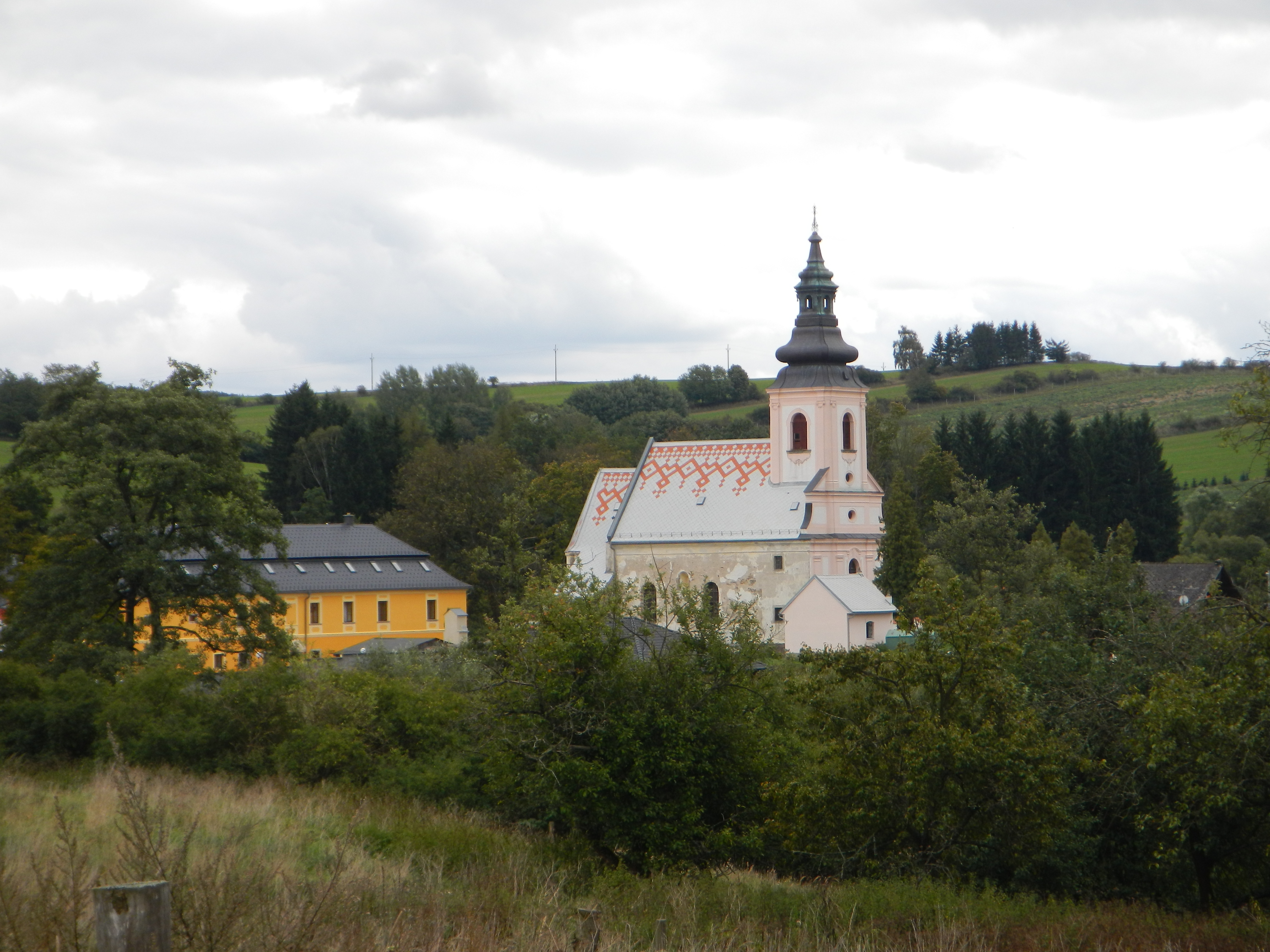
- Church of Saints Peter and Paul

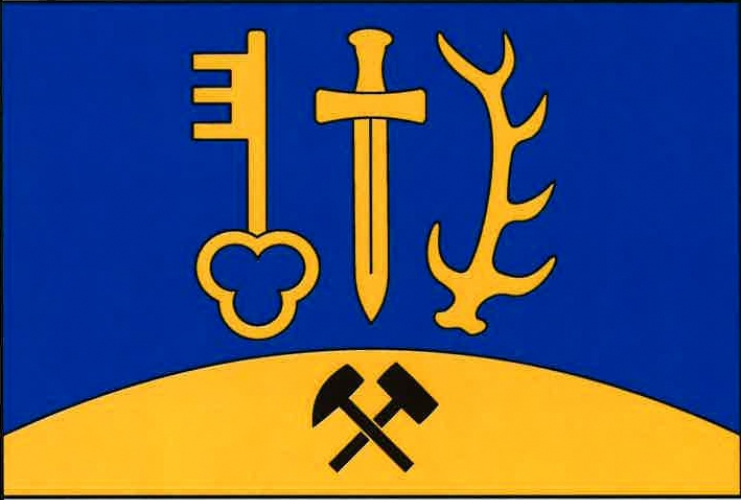
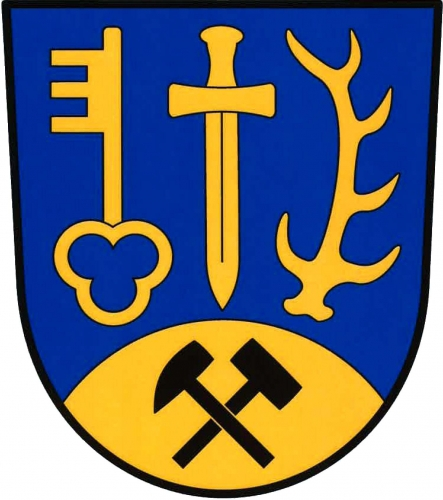
- Flag Coat of arms

- Location in the Czech Republic
- Coordinates: 49°21′45″N 15°35′19″E
- Country: Czech Republic
- Region: Vysočina
- District: Jihlava
- First mentioned: 1305

Area
  - Total: 6.49 km^{2} (2.51 sq mi)
- Elevation: 510 m (1,670 ft)

Population (2026-01-01)
  - Total: 485
  - Density: 74.7/km^{2} (194/sq mi)
- Time zone: UTC+1 (CET)
  - Summer (DST): UTC+2 (CEST)
- Postal code: 586 01
- Website: www.rancirov.cz

Rančířov (Czech pronunciation: [ˈrantʃiːr̝of]) is a municipality and village in Jihlava District in the Vysočina Region of the Czech Republic. It has about 500 inhabitants.

Rančířov lies approximately 4 kilometres (2 mi) south of Jihlava and 116 km (72 mi) south-east of Prague.

== Demographics ==
Historical population
Year	Pop.	±%
1869	261	—
1880	278	+6.5%
1890	269	−3.2%
1900	255	−5.2%
1910	269	+5.5%
1921	259	−3.7%
1930	278	+7.3%
1950	210	−24.5%
1961	190	−9.5%
1970	189	−0.5%
1980	196	+3.7%
1991	168	−14.3%
2001	194	+15.5%
2011	372	+91.8%
2021	452	+21.5%
Source: Censuses
