= Hubenov =

- Municipality
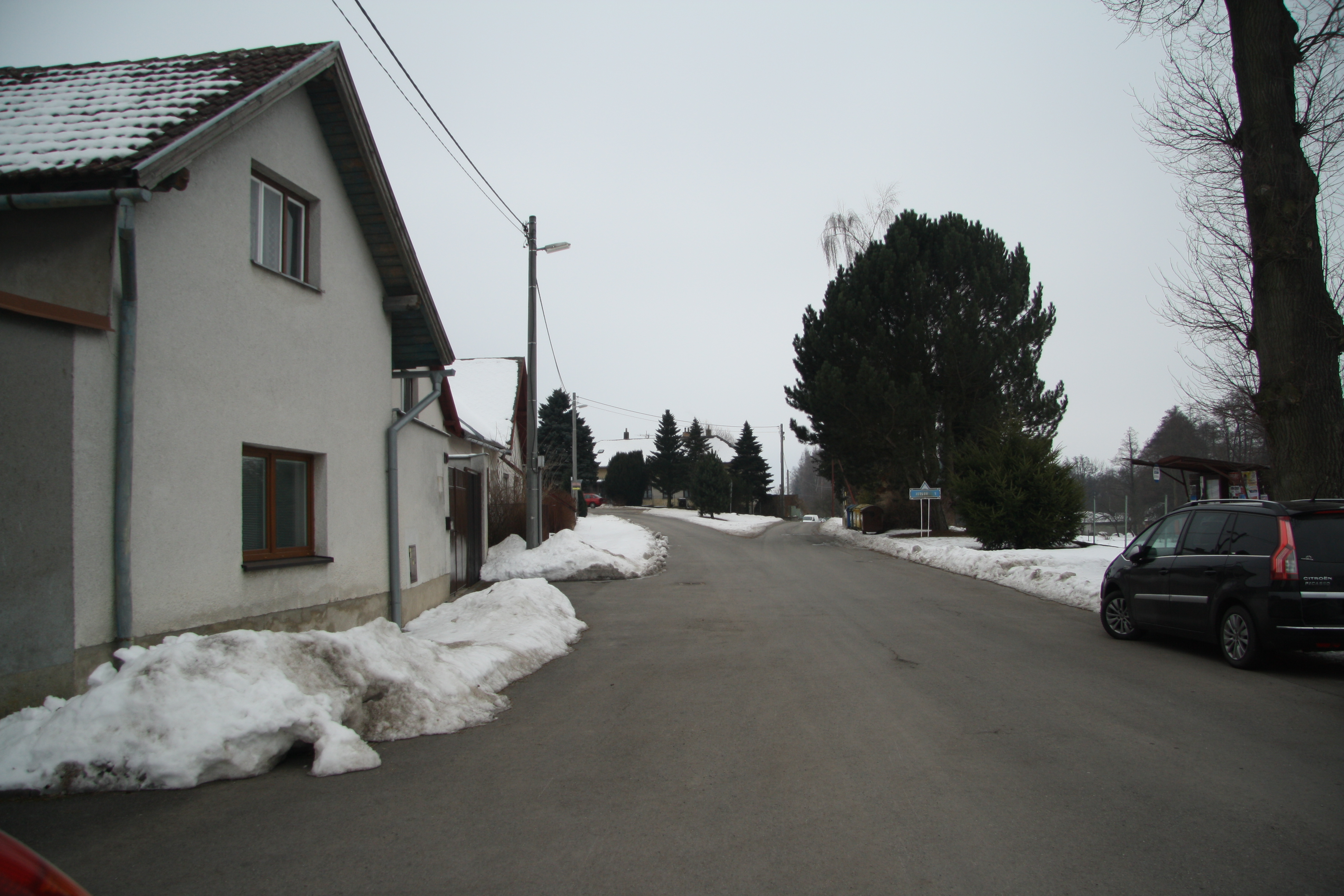
- Centre of Hubenov

- Location in the Czech Republic
- Coordinates: 49°23′32″N 15°28′9″E
- Country: Czech Republic
- Region: Vysočina
- District: Jihlava
- First mentioned: 1366

Area
  - Total: 2.56 km^{2} (0.99 sq mi)
- Elevation: 578 m (1,896 ft)

Population (2026-01-01)
  - Total: 145
  - Density: 56.6/km^{2} (147/sq mi)
- Time zone: UTC+1 (CET)
  - Summer (DST): UTC+2 (CEST)
- Postal code: 588 05
- Website: www.obec-hubenov.cz

Hubenov (Czech pronunciation: [ˈɦubɛnof]) is a municipality and village in Jihlava District in the Vysočina Region of the Czech Republic. It has about 100 inhabitants.

Hubenov lies approximately 9 kilometres (6 mi) west of Jihlava and 108 km (67 mi) south-east of Prague.

== Demographics ==
Historical population
Year	Pop.	±%
1869	171	—
1880	152	−11.1%
1890	138	−9.2%
1900	129	−6.5%
1910	157	+21.7%
1921	169	+7.6%
1930	142	−16.0%
1950	143	+0.7%
1961	153	+7.0%
1970	157	+2.6%
1980	142	−9.6%
1991	153	+7.7%
2001	148	−3.3%
2011	134	−9.5%
2021	133	−0.7%
Source: Censuses
