= Čížov =

- Municipality
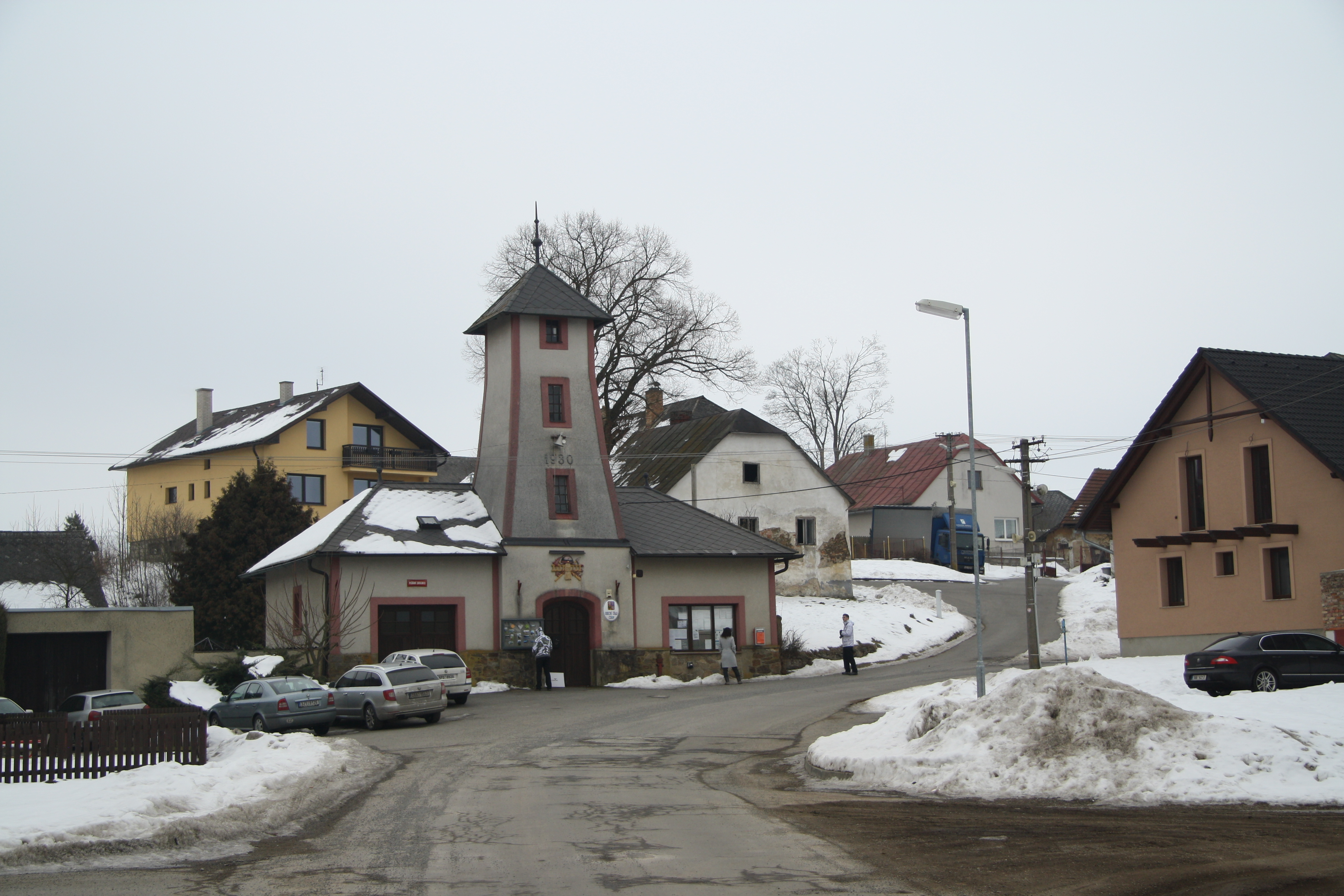
- Centre of Čížov with the municipal office

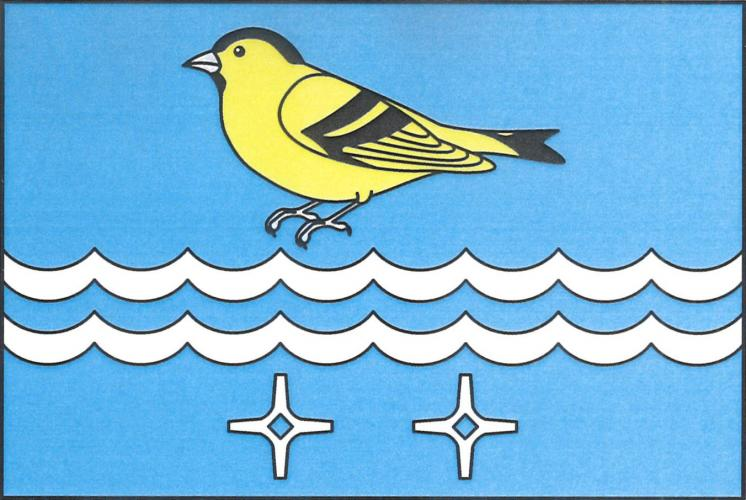
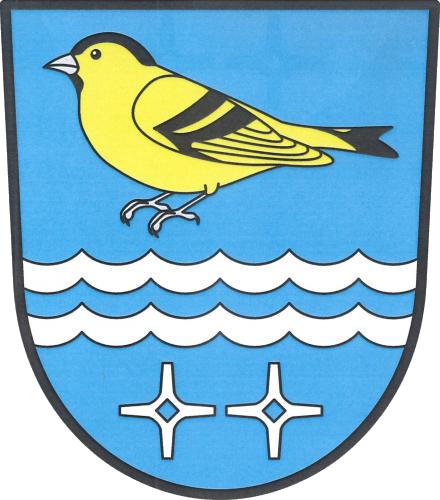
- Flag Coat of arms

- Location in the Czech Republic
- Coordinates: 49°21′6″N 15°35′18″E
- Country: Czech Republic
- Region: Vysočina
- District: Jihlava
- First mentioned: 1358

Area
  - Total: 7.08 km^{2} (2.73 sq mi)
- Elevation: 525 m (1,722 ft)

Population (2026-01-01)
  - Total: 294
  - Density: 41.5/km^{2} (108/sq mi)
- Time zone: UTC+1 (CET)
  - Summer (DST): UTC+2 (CEST)
- Postal code: 586 01
- Website: www.obec-cizov.cz

Čížov (Czech pronunciation: [ˈtʃiːʒof]) is a municipality and village in Jihlava District in the Vysočina Region of the Czech Republic. It has about 300 inhabitants.

Čížov lies approximately 6 kilometres (4 mi) south of Jihlava and 117 km (73 mi) south-east of Prague.

== Demographics ==
Historical population
Year	Pop.	±%
1869	265	—
1880	256	−3.4%
1890	274	+7.0%
1900	255	−6.9%
1910	249	−2.4%
1921	262	+5.2%
1930	244	−6.9%
1950	190	−22.1%
1961	162	−14.7%
1970	152	−6.2%
1980	141	−7.2%
1991	142	+0.7%
2001	161	+13.4%
2011	239	+48.4%
2021	286	+19.7%
Source: Censuses
