= Šlapanka =

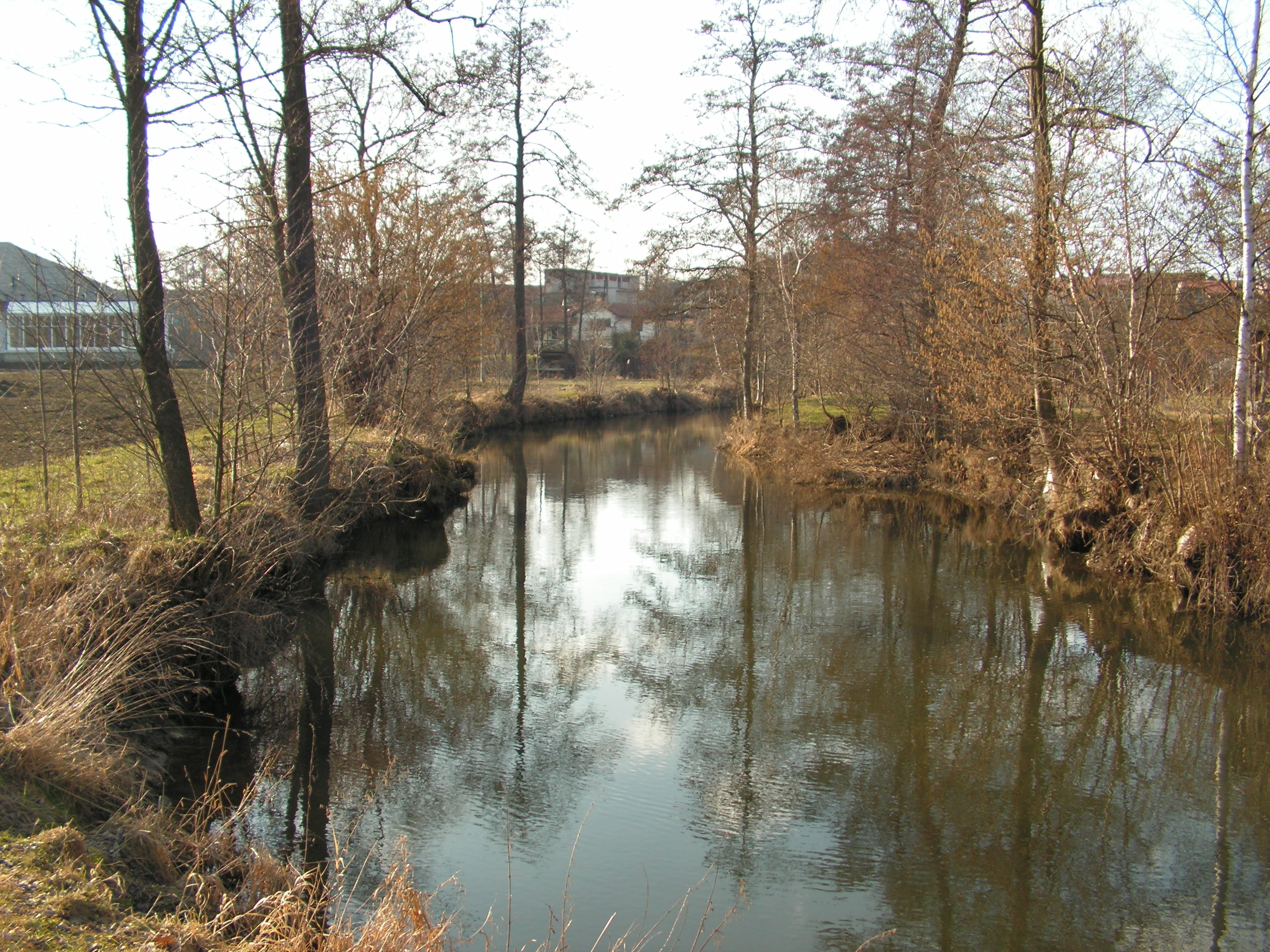
- The Šlapanka near estuary

Location
- Country: Czech Republic
- Region: Vysočina

Physical characteristics
- Source
  - location: Kamenice, Křižanov Highlands
  - coordinates: 49°24′23″N 15°46′40″E
  - elevation: 595 m (1,952 ft)
- Mouth
  - location: Sázava
  - coordinates: 49°36′2″N 15°35′42″E
  - elevation: 410 m (1,350 ft)
- Length: 39.0 km (24.2 mi)
- Basin size: 264.8 km^{2} (102.2 sq mi)
- Discharge
  - average: 1.20 m^{3}/s (42 cu ft/s) 4.5 km before estuary

Basin features
- Progression: Sázava→ Vltava→ Elbe→ North Sea

The Šlapanka is a river in the Czech Republic, a left tributary of the Sázava River. It flows through the Vysočina Region. It is 39.0 km (24.2 mi) long.

== Etymology ==
The river is named after the village of Šlapanov, located on the middle course of the river.

== Characteristic ==
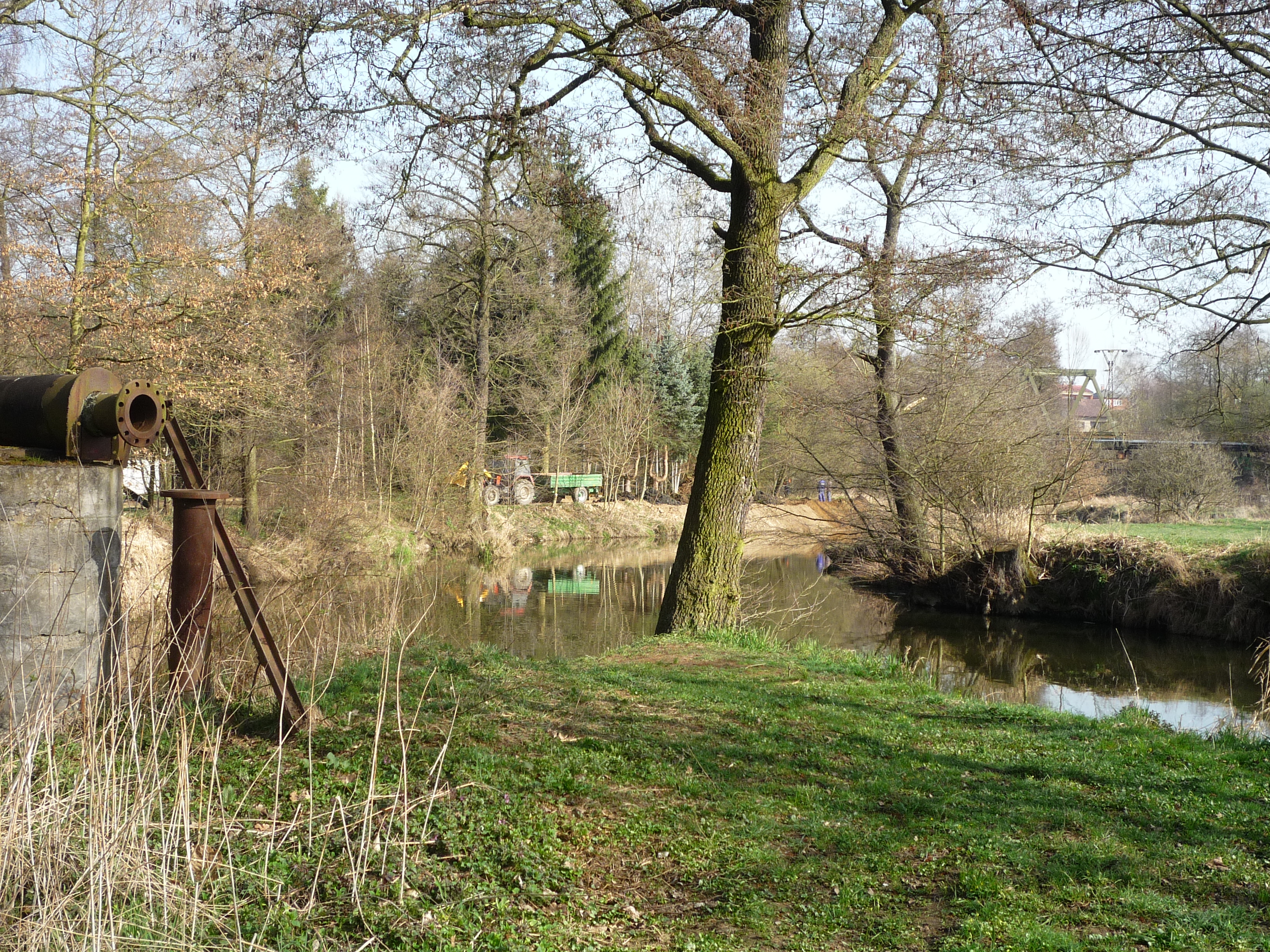
Confluence of the Šlapanka (right) and Sázava

The Šlapanka originates in the territory of Kamenice in the Křižanov Highlands at an elevation of 595 m (1,952 ft) and flows to Havlíčkův Brod, where it enters the Sázava River at an elevation of 410 m (1,350 ft). It is 39.0 km (24.2 mi) long. Its drainage basin has an area of 264.8 km^{2} (102.2 sq mi). The average discharge at 4.5 river km is 1.20 m^{3}/s (42 cu ft/s).

The longest tributaries of the Šlapanka are:

Tributary	Length (km)	Side
Zlatý potok	20.3	left
Ochozský potok	10.5	right
Skrýšovský potok	9.9	right
Zhořský potok	9.1	right

== Course ==
The river flows through the municipal territories of Kamenice, Věžnice (Jihlava District), Vysoké Studnice, Rybné, Kozlov, Jamné, Ždírec, Věžnička, Polná, Věžnice (Havlíčkův Brod District), Šlapanov, Vysoká, Bartoušov and Havlíčkův Brod.

== Bodies of water ==
A system of three fishponds (Peklo, Bor and Kukle) is built on the middle course of the Šlapanka. The largest of them is Peklo, located inside the built-up area of the town of Polná. It was founded in 1479–1482 and has an area of 16 ha (40 acres).

== Nature ==
The wetland meadow and floodplain forest next to the lower course of the river is protected as the Šlapanka Nature Monument. It has an area of 3.1 ha (7.7 acres). River-bound animals that live here include the Eurasian otter, white-throated dipper, and common kingfisher.

== Bridges ==
The Šlapanka in Věžnice (Havlíčkův Brod District) is spanned by a stone road bridge from the turn of the 15th and 16th centuries, called U Lutriána. It is a valuable technical monument, protected as a cultural monument.

== See also ==
- List of rivers of the Czech Republic
