= Věžnice =

Věžnice may refer to places in the Czech Republic:

- Věžnice (Havlíčkův Brod District), a municipality and village in the Vysočina Region
- Věžnice (Jihlava District), a municipality and village in the Vysočina Region
