= Kamenice (Jihlava District) =

- Market town
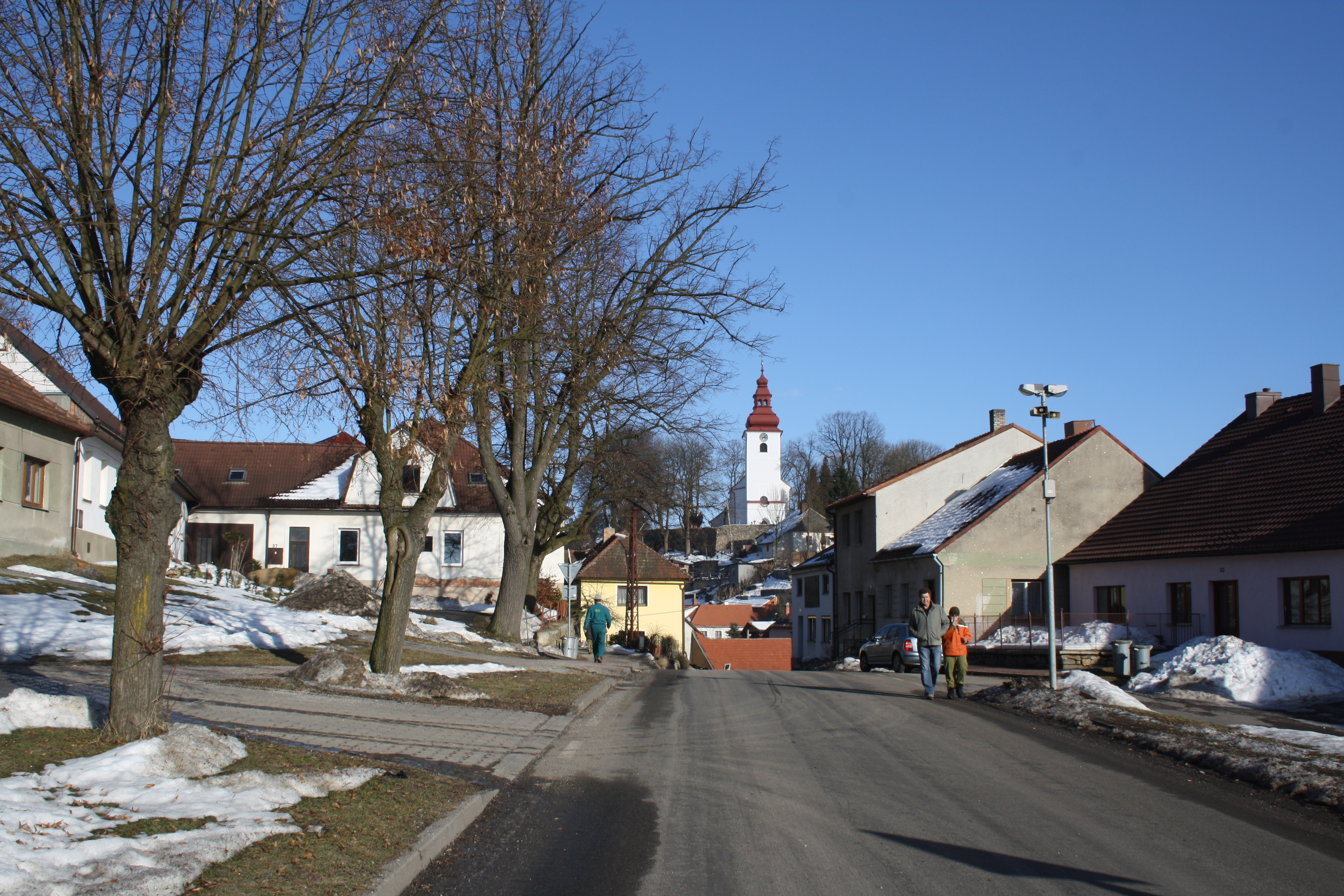
- Centre of Kamenice

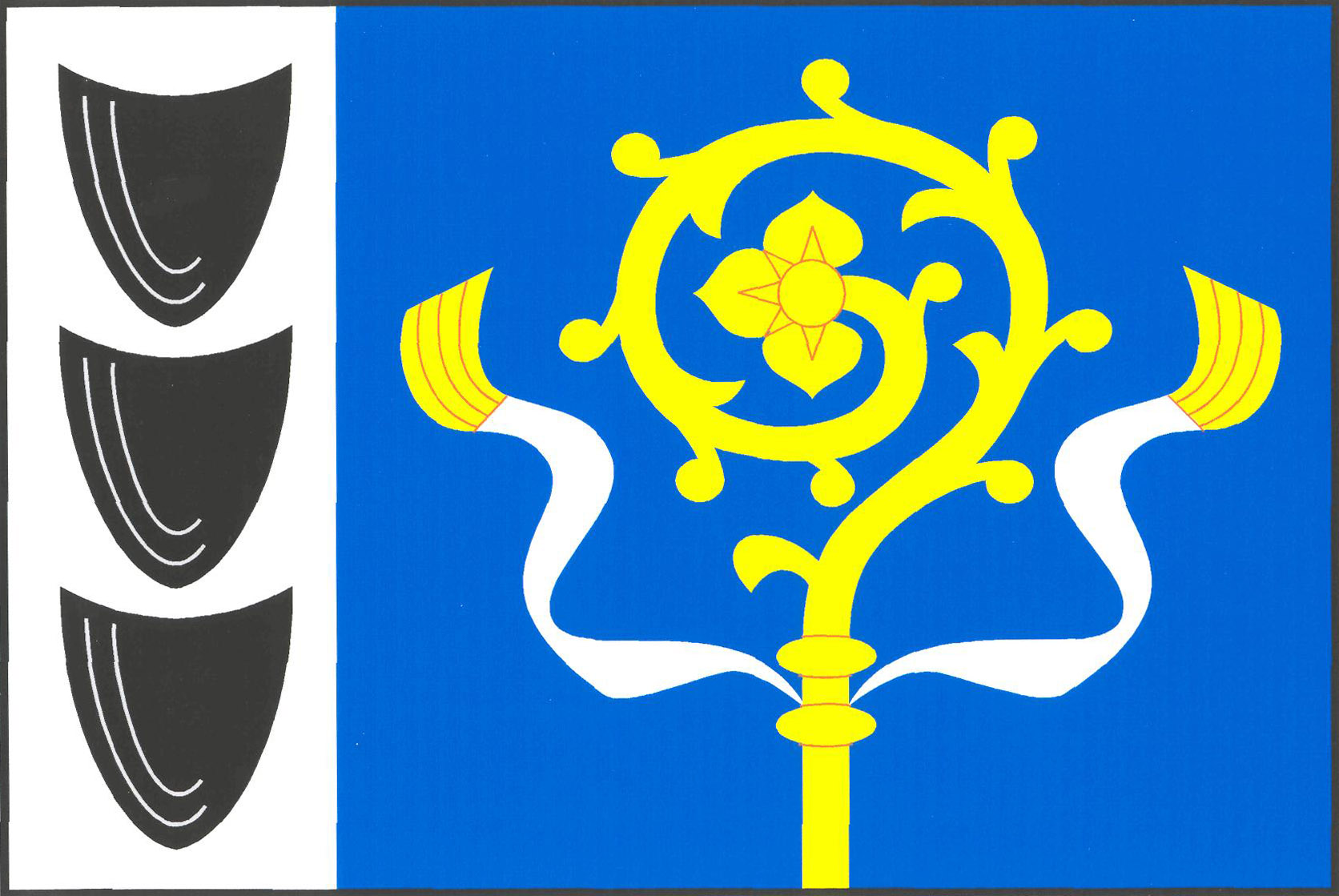
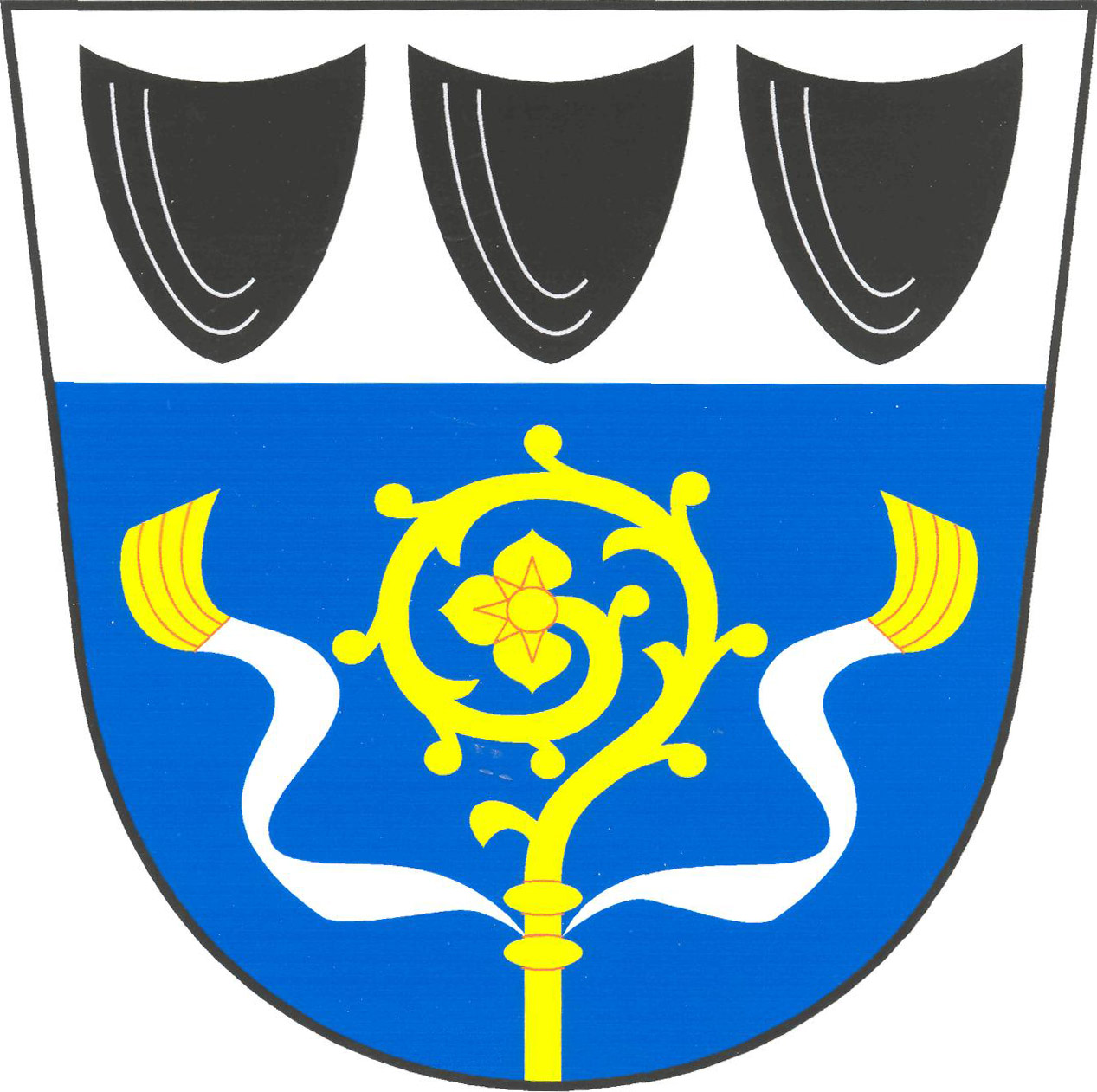
- Flag Coat of arms

- Location in the Czech Republic
- Coordinates: 49°22′0″N 15°46′49″E
- Country: Czech Republic
- Region: Vysočina
- District: Jihlava
- First mentioned: 1358

Area
  - Total: 34.05 km^{2} (13.15 sq mi)
- Elevation: 510 m (1,670 ft)

Population (2026-01-01)
  - Total: 1,973
  - Density: 57.94/km^{2} (150.1/sq mi)
- Time zone: UTC+1 (CET)
  - Summer (DST): UTC+2 (CEST)
- Postal code: 588 22 – 588 24, 675 03
- Website: www.kameniceujihlavy.cz

Kamenice (Czech pronunciation: [ˈkamɛɲɪtsɛ]; German: Kamenitz) is a market town in Jihlava District in the Vysočina Region of the Czech Republic. It has about 2,000 inhabitants.

== Administrative division ==
Kamenice consists of four municipal parts (in brackets population according to the 2021 census):

- Kamenice (1,361)
- Kamenička (186)
- Řehořov (290)
- Vržanov (59)

== Geography ==
Kamenice is located about 14 kilometres (9 mi) east of Jihlava. It lies in the Křižanov Highlands. The highest point is the hill Bílá hora at 659 m (2,162 ft) above sea level. The Kamenička Stream flows through the market town. The Šlapanka River originates in the northern part of the municipal territory.

== History ==
The first written mention of Kamenice is from 1358. From 1492 to 1556, it was a property of the Pernštejn family. In 1556, Kamenice was referred to as a market town for the first time. In 1574, a large fire destroyed almost all of Kamenice, and all representative buildings had to be rebuilt.

== Demographics ==
Historical population

Year	Pop.	±%
1869	2,704	—
1880	2,849	+5.4%
1890	2,764	−3.0%
1900	2,756	−0.3%
1910	2,691	−2.4%

Year	Pop.	±%
1921	2,601	−3.3%
1930	2,563	−1.5%
1950	2,228	−13.1%
1961	2,382	+6.9%
1970	2,098	−11.9%

Year	Pop.	±%
1980	1,928	−8.1%
1991	1,924	−0.2%
2001	1,768	−8.1%
2011	1,824	+3.2%
2021	1,896	+3.9%

Source: Censuses

== Transport ==
The D1 motorway runs through the northern part of the municipal territory.

== Sights ==
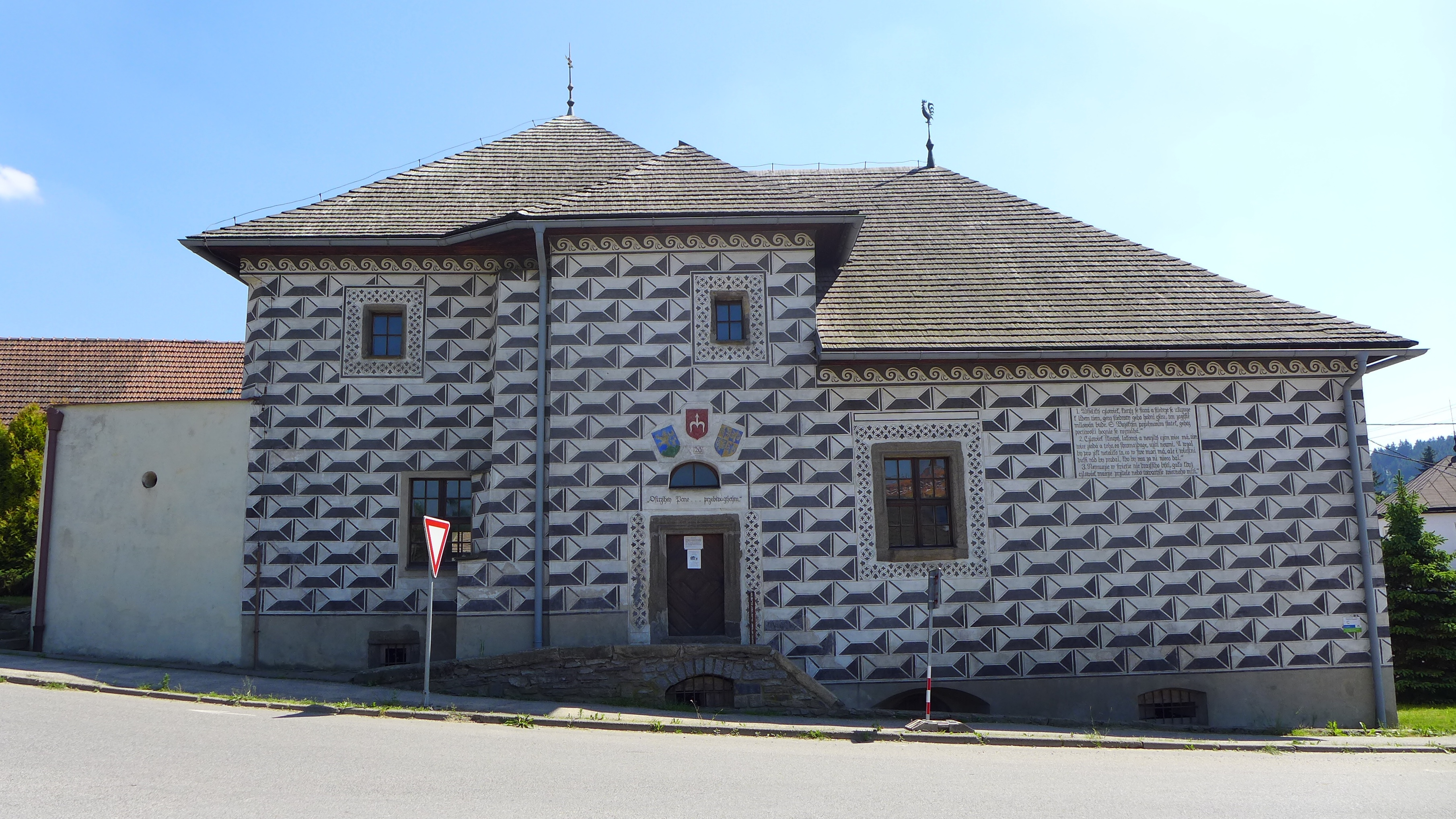
Kamenice Fortress

The Church of Saint James the Great is a cemetery church on the outskirts of the market town. It has a Romanesque core and a Renaissance tower. The church was modified into its present Baroque form in 1723–1765.

The Chapel of Saint Anne is located in the centre of Kamenice. It was built in the Baroque style in 1730.

A notable building is the former fortress. The original Gothic fortress was completely rebuilt in the Renaissance style in the 16th century. It is decorated with sgraffito. Today it houses a small museum.

== Notable people ==
- Franz Krommer (1759–1831), composer
