= Franz Krommer =

Czech violinist and composer of classical music (1759–1831)

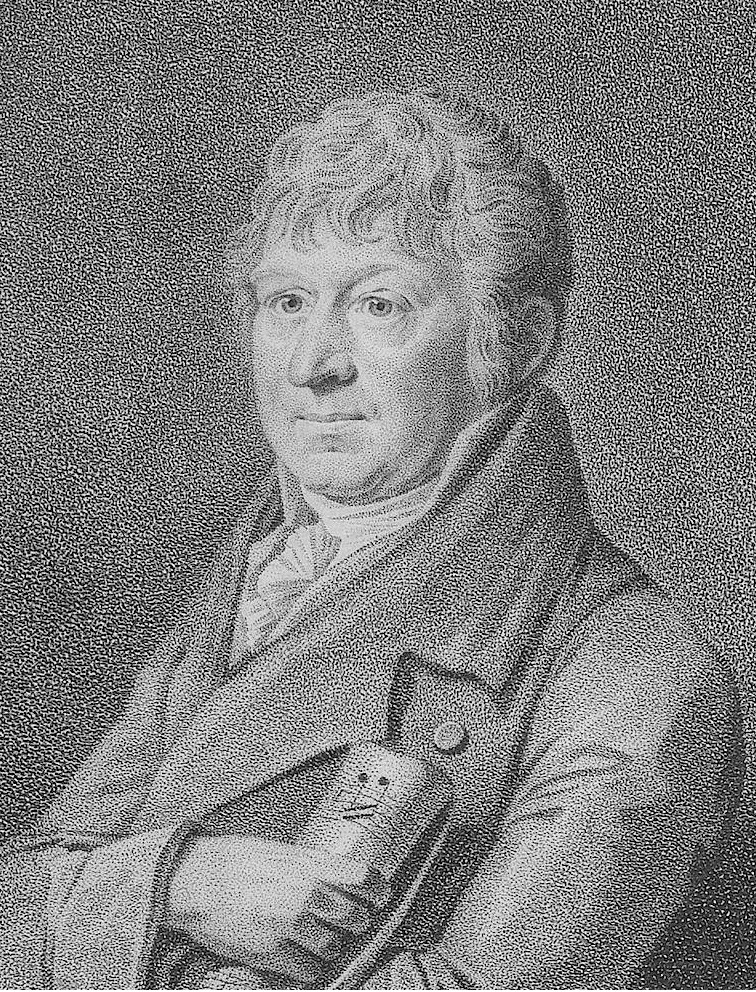
- Born: František Vincenc Kramář; 27 November 1759; Kamenice u Jihlavy, Moravia
- Died: 8 January 1831 (aged 71); Vienna, Austrian Empire
- Occupation: Composer

Franz Krommer (Czech: František Vincenc Kramář; 27 November 1759 – 8 January 1831) was a Czech composer of classical music and violinist. He was one of the most popular composers in 19th-century Vienna alongside Beethoven, whom he knew. Today he is mostly known for his clarinet and double clarinet concertos.

== Life ==
Franz Krommer was born František Vincenc Kramář in Kamenice. His parents went by a Germanized version of their surname, Krommer. His father was an innkeeper in Kamenice until the family moved to Třebíč in 1773. From 1773 to 1776, Franz studied violin and organ with his uncle, Antonín Mattias Kramář (1742–1804), in Brno-Tuřany. He became an organist here along with his uncle in 1777. In 1785 he moved to Vienna and later to Simontornya in Hungary, where he was a violinist and later a Kapellmeister for the orchestra of the Count of Limburg Stirum. In 1790, Krommer was named choirmaster at the Pécs Cathedral in Hungary. In 1793 he became a Kapellmeister to Count Anton II Grassalkovich. He returned to Vienna in 1795, becoming maestro di cappella for Duke Ignaz Fuchs in 1798.

In 1818 Krommer succeeded Leopold Koželuch as Kapellmeister, composer for the imperial court of Austria for Francis I, the first Emperor of Austria, the post he held until his death. According to Carl Engel he may have been Kapellmeister as early as 1814. He died on 8 January 1831 in Vienna at the age of 71.

== Compositions ==
His output included at least 300 published compositions across 110 opus numbers. These works consist of at least 9 symphonies, 70 string quartets, wind and string pieces, approximately 15 string quintets, and music for wind ensemble.

Occasionally a system of classification of Krommer's works is seen in use based on Karel Padrta's work. For example, the quintet for flute and strings, Op. 55 in E minor is PadK VII/3, the concerto Op. 86 for flute and orchestra (also in E minor, and often played with clarinet solo) is PadK III/16. These examples are taken from the listings at a Czech radio station's website, which gives both the standard opus numbers (when available) and the newer system.
