= Ždírec (Jihlava District) =

- Municipality
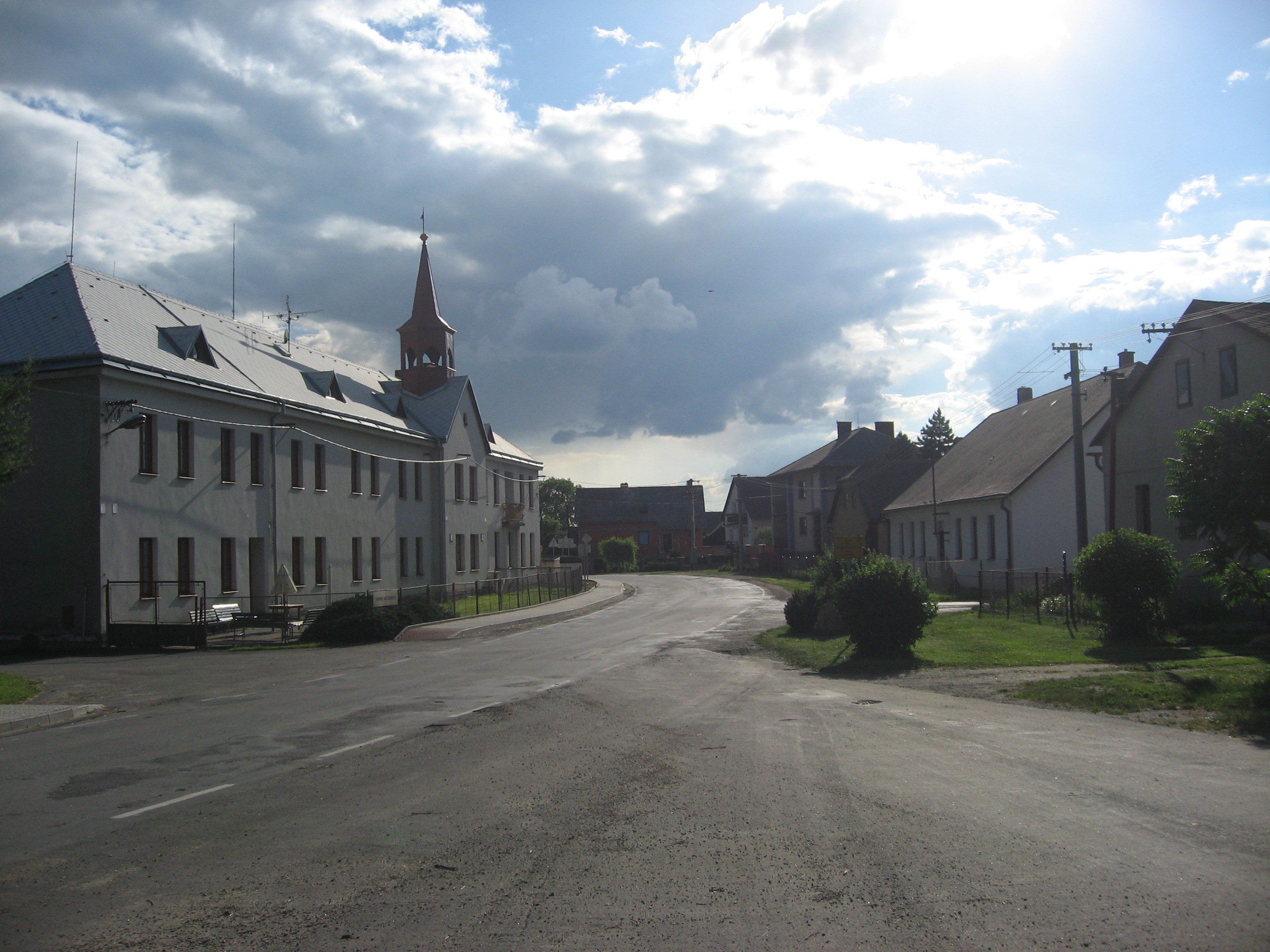
- Retirement home by the main road

- Flag Coat of arms

- Location in the Czech Republic
- Coordinates: 49°27′18″N 15°40′43″E
- Country: Czech Republic
- Region: Vysočina
- District: Jihlava
- First mentioned: 1233

Area
  - Total: 10.37 km^{2} (4.00 sq mi)
- Elevation: 515 m (1,690 ft)

Population (2026-01-01)
  - Total: 437
  - Density: 42.1/km^{2} (109/sq mi)
- Time zone: UTC+1 (CET)
  - Summer (DST): UTC+2 (CEST)
- Postal code: 588 13
- Website: www.obeczdirec.cz

Ždírec (German: Seelenz) is a municipality and village in Jihlava District in the Vysočina Region of the Czech Republic. It has about 400 inhabitants.

== Etymology ==
The name Ždírec is a diminute of žďár. It was derived from the Old Czech word žďářit, which means 'to remove the forest with fire' (slash-and-burn). It refers to the method used during colonisation to create space for newly established settlements.

== Geography ==
Ždírec is located about 8 kilometres (5 mi) northeast of Jihlava. It lies in the Upper Sázava Hills. The highest point is at 552 m (1,811 ft) above sea level. The stream Ždírecký potok flows through the municipality. The stream supplies several small fishponds. The upper course of the Šlapanka River crosses the municipal territory in the east.

== History ==
The first written mention of Ždírec is from 1233. From the 13th century until 1945, Ždírec was ethnically a German village. It belonged to the German-speaking enclave called Jihlava Language Island. After World War II, the German-speaking population was expelled and the municipality was resettled by Czechs.

== Demographics ==
Historical population

Year	Pop.	±%
1869	344	—
1880	437	+27.0%
1890	467	+6.9%
1900	430	−7.9%
1910	415	−3.5%

Year	Pop.	±%
1921	411	−1.0%
1930	393	−4.4%
1950	348	−11.5%
1961	348	+0.0%
1970	347	−0.3%

Year	Pop.	±%
1980	338	−2.6%
1991	320	−5.3%
2001	388	+21.2%
2011	338	−12.9%
2021	496	+46.7%

Source: Censuses

== Transport ==
There are no railways or major roads passing through the municipality.

== Sights ==
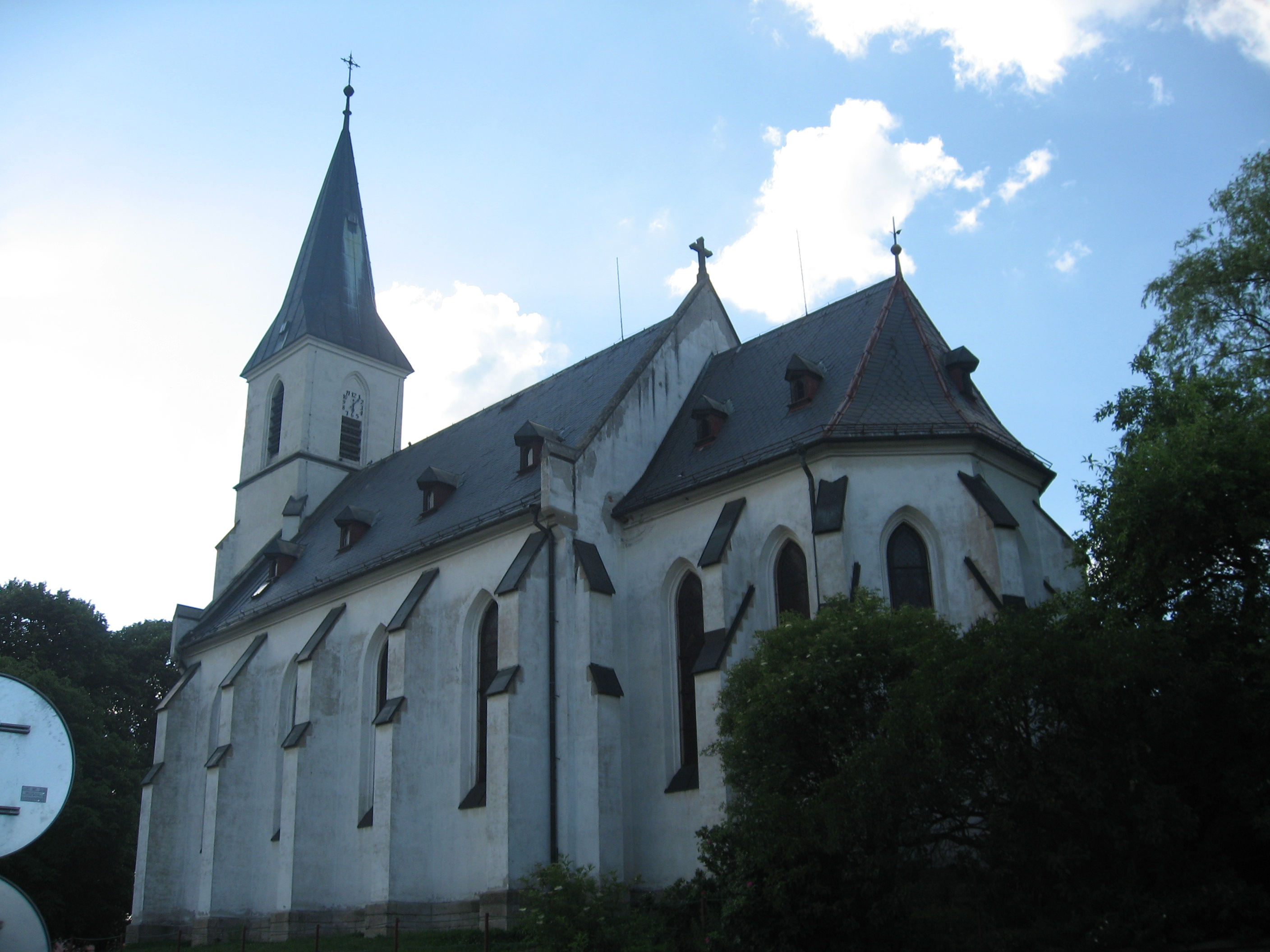
Church of Saint Wenceslaus

The main landmark of Ždírec is the Church of Saint Wenceslaus. It was built in the pseudo-Gothic style in 1893–1898, after the old church was destroyed by a fire in 1890.

Other sights include a Baroque sculptural group of Saint John of Nepomuk from 1743, a Baroque statue of Saint Anthony of Padua from 1753, and the building of the retirement home from 1926 with the Chapel of the Virgin Mary.
