= Jamné =

- Municipality
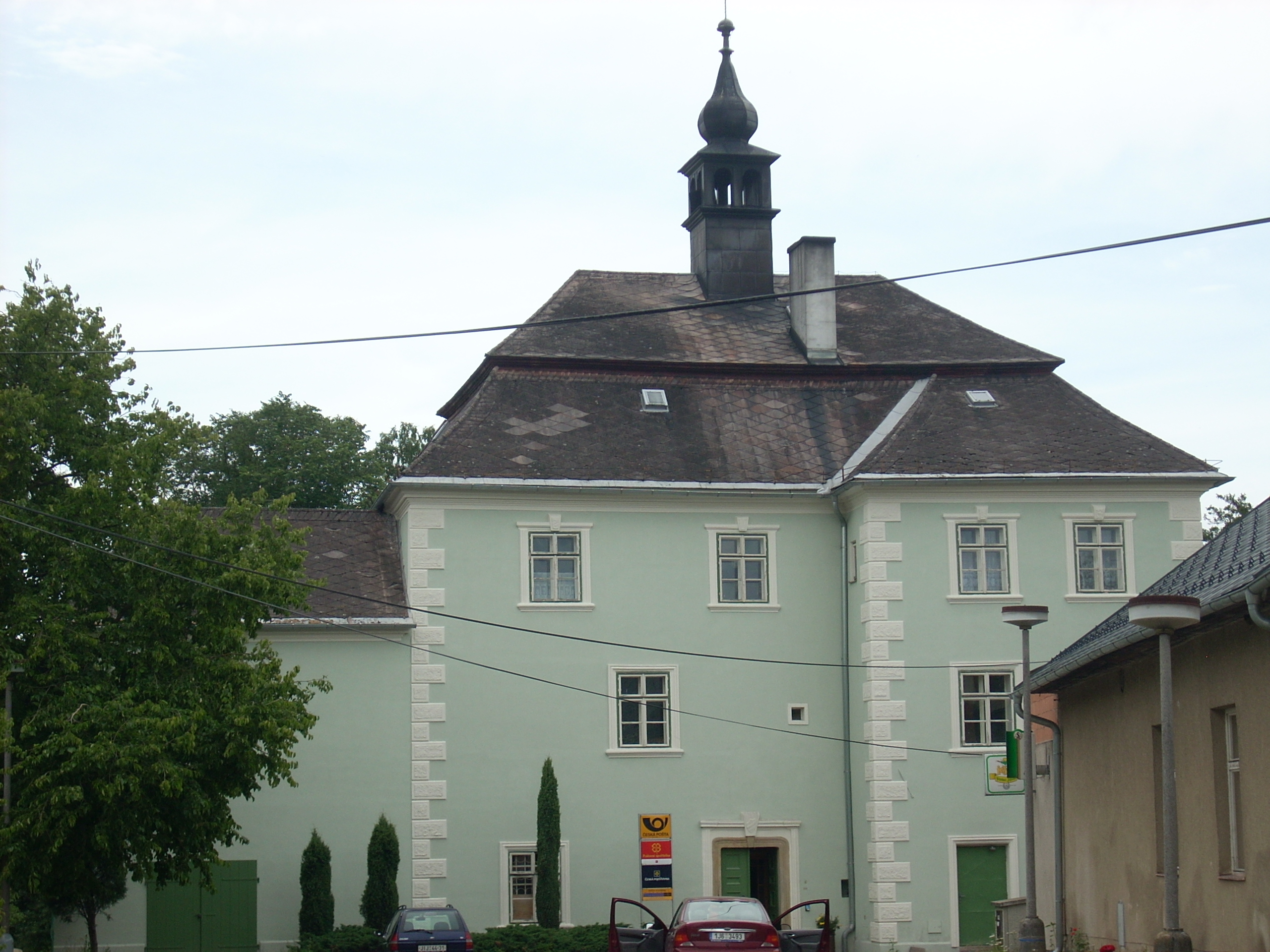
- Jamné Castle

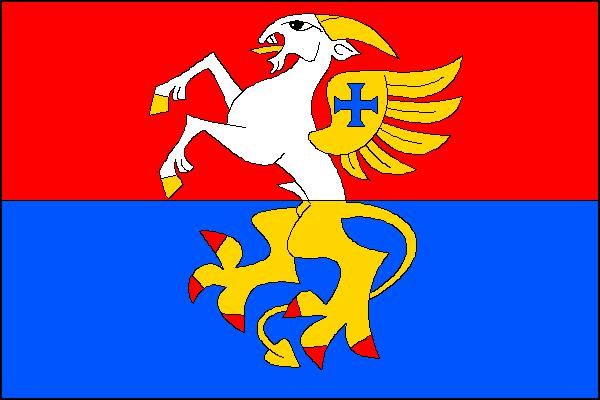
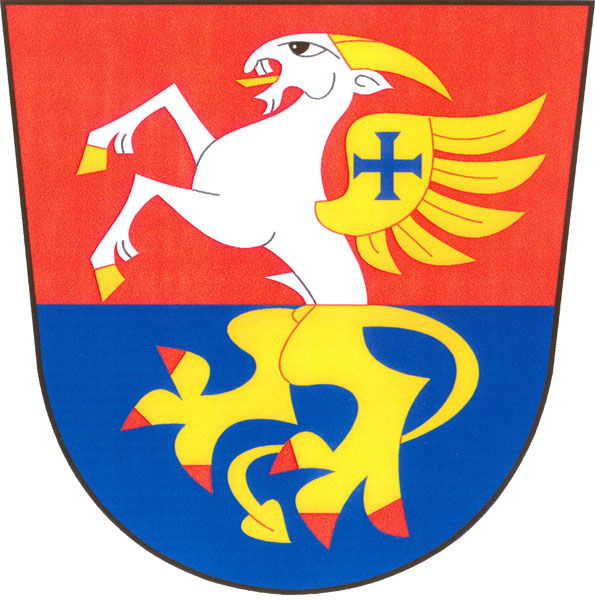
- Flag Coat of arms

- Location in the Czech Republic
- Coordinates: 49°25′52″N 15°43′26″E
- Country: Czech Republic
- Region: Vysočina
- District: Jihlava
- First mentioned: 1444

Area
  - Total: 11.19 km^{2} (4.32 sq mi)
- Elevation: 514 m (1,686 ft)

Population (2026-01-01)
  - Total: 576
  - Density: 51.5/km^{2} (133/sq mi)
- Time zone: UTC+1 (CET)
  - Summer (DST): UTC+2 (CEST)
- Postal code: 588 27
- Website: www.jamneujihlavy.cz

Jamné (Czech pronunciation: [ˈjamnɛː]) is a municipality and village in Jihlava District in the Vysočina Region of the Czech Republic. It has about 600 inhabitants.

Jamné lies approximately 11 kilometres (7 mi) north-east of Jihlava and 119 km (74 mi) south-east of Prague.

== Administrative division ==
Jamné consists of two municipal parts (in brackets population according to the 2021 census):

- Jamné (540)
- Lipina (15)

== Demographics ==
Historical population
Year	Pop.	±%
1869	527	—
1880	584	+10.8%
1890	606	+3.8%
1900	668	+10.2%
1910	638	−4.5%
1921	633	−0.8%
1930	661	+4.4%
1950	567	−14.2%
1961	596	+5.1%
1970	542	−9.1%
1980	488	−10.0%
1991	447	−8.4%
2001	490	+9.6%
2011	515	+5.1%
2021	555	+7.8%
Source: Censuses
