= Šlapanov =

- Municipality
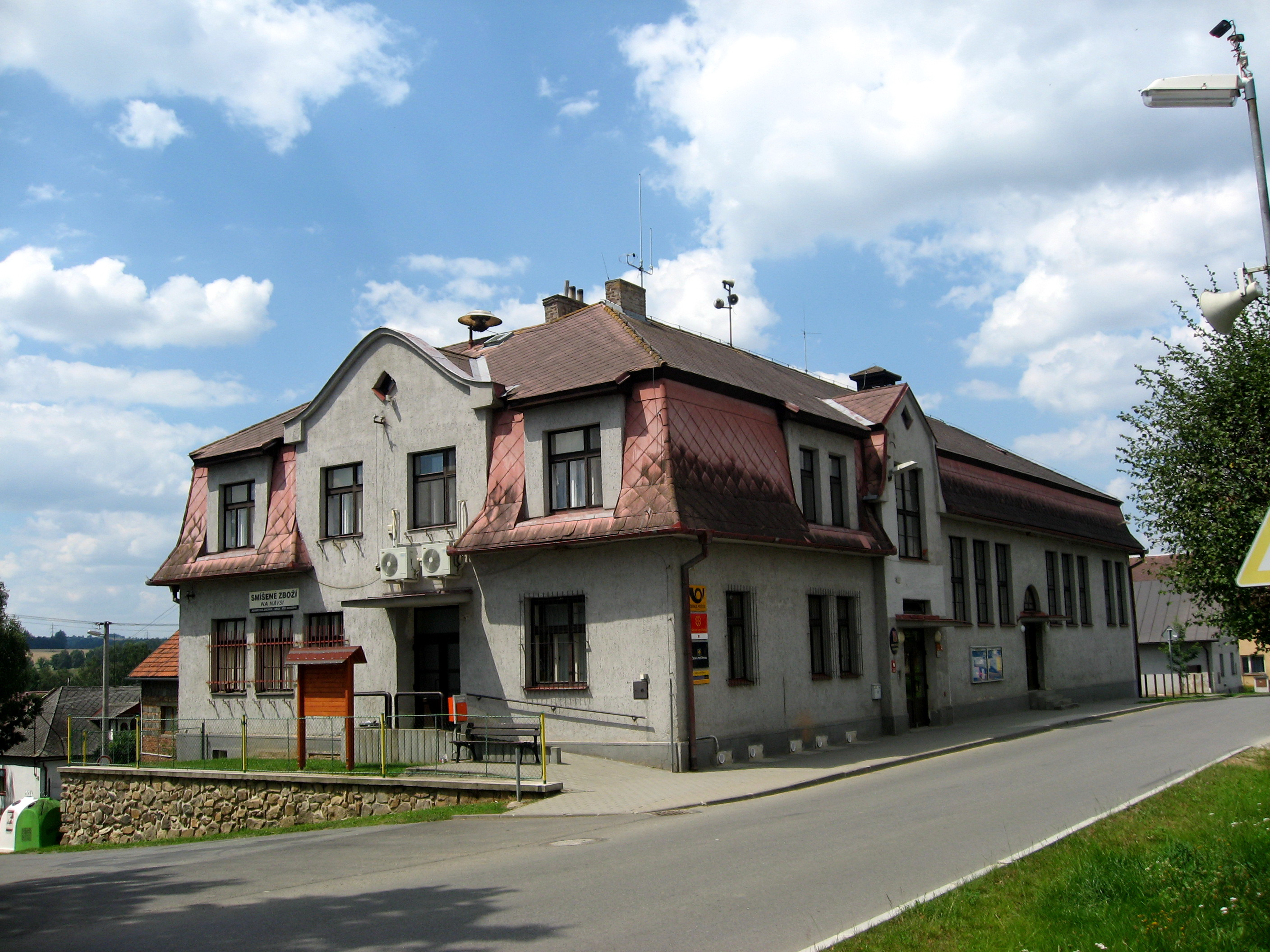
- Municipal office

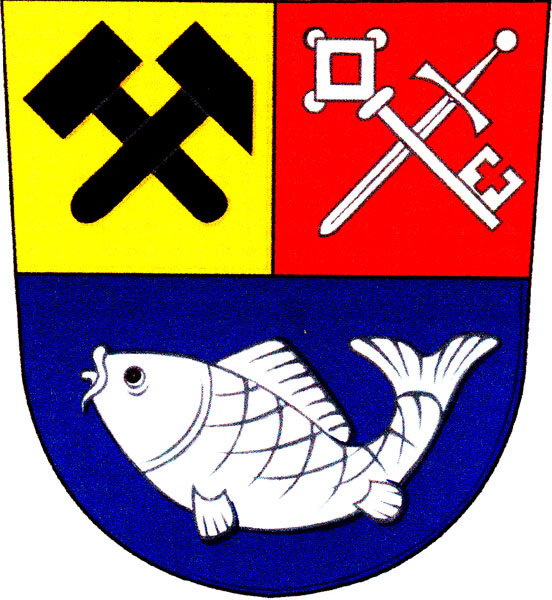
- Flag Coat of arms

- Location in the Czech Republic
- Coordinates: 49°32′33″N 15°39′28″E
- Country: Czech Republic
- Region: Vysočina
- District: Havlíčkův Brod
- First mentioned: 1257

Area
  - Total: 15.99 km^{2} (6.17 sq mi)
- Elevation: 457 m (1,499 ft)

Population (2026-01-01)
  - Total: 800
  - Density: 50/km^{2} (130/sq mi)
- Time zone: UTC+1 (CET)
  - Summer (DST): UTC+2 (CEST)
- Postal code: 582 51
- Website: www.slapanov.cz

Šlapanov (German: Schlappenz) is a municipality and village in Havlíčkův Brod District in the Vysočina Region of the Czech Republic. It has about 800 inhabitants.

Šlapanov lies approximately 10 kilometres (6 mi) south-east of Havlíčkův Brod, 17 km (11 mi) north of Jihlava, and 108 km (67 mi) south-east of Prague.

== Administrative division ==
Šlapanov consists of three municipal parts (in brackets population according to the 2021 census):

- Šlapanov (682)
- Kněžská (52)
- Šachotín (42)

== Demographics ==
Historical population
Year	Pop.	±%
1869	687	—
1880	711	+3.5%
1890	736	+3.5%
1900	729	−1.0%
1910	750	+2.9%
1921	788	+5.1%
1930	857	+8.8%
1950	801	−6.5%
1961	855	+6.7%
1970	897	+4.9%
1980	830	−7.5%
1991	811	−2.3%
2001	797	−1.7%
2011	780	−2.1%
2021	776	−0.5%
Source: Censuses

== Transport ==
Šlapanov lies on the railway line Jihlava–Havlíčkův Brod.
