= Rybné =

- Municipality
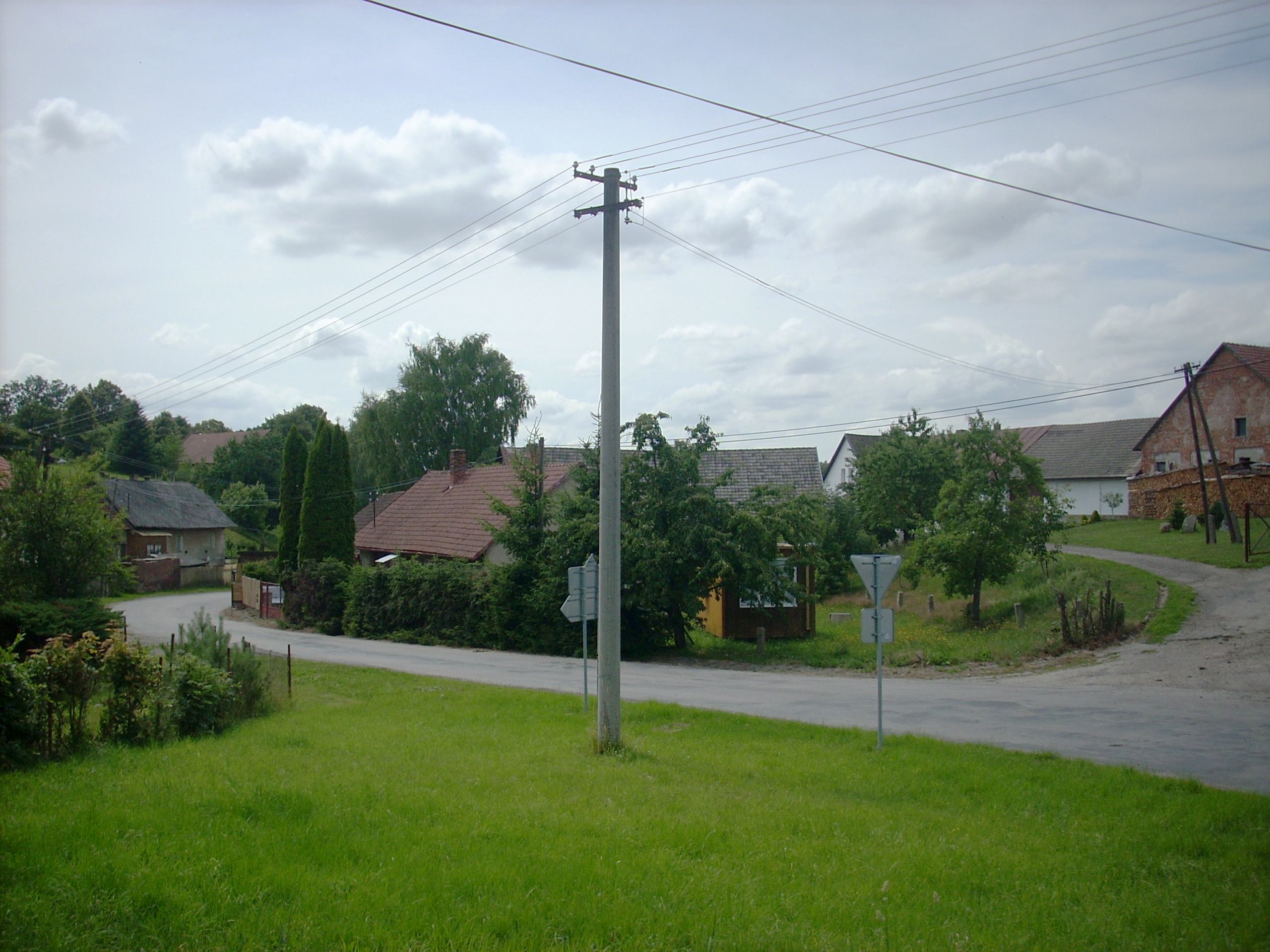
- Main road

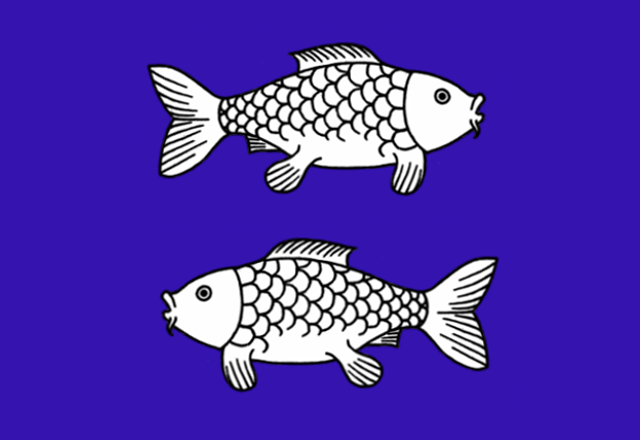
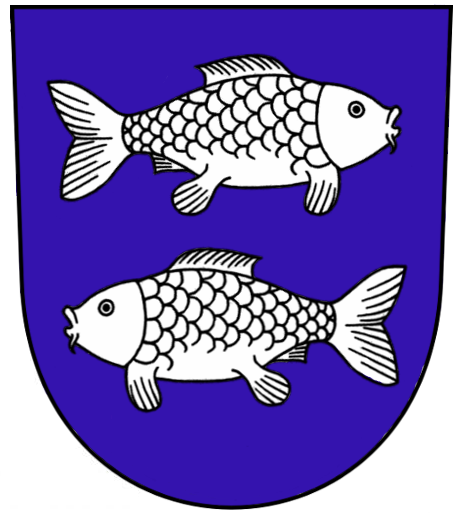
- Flag Coat of arms

- Location in the Czech Republic
- Coordinates: 49°25′22″N 15°44′11″E
- Country: Czech Republic
- Region: Vysočina
- District: Jihlava
- First mentioned: 1356

Area
  - Total: 5.48 km^{2} (2.12 sq mi)
- Elevation: 565 m (1,854 ft)

Population (2026-01-01)
  - Total: 119
  - Density: 21.7/km^{2} (56.2/sq mi)
- Time zone: UTC+1 (CET)
  - Summer (DST): UTC+2 (CEST)
- Postal code: 588 27
- Website: www.rybne.cz

Rybné (Czech pronunciation: [ˈrɪbnɛː]) is a municipality and village in Jihlava District in the Vysočina Region of the Czech Republic. It has about 100 inhabitants.

Rybné lies approximately 12 kilometres (7 mi) east of Jihlava and 121 km (75 mi) south-east of Prague.

== Demographics ==
Historical population
| Year | Pop. | ±% |
|---|---|---|
| 1869 | 228 | — |
| 1880 | 264 | +15.8% |
| 1890 | 297 | +12.5% |
| 1900 | 268 | −9.8% |
| 1910 | 270 | +0.7% |
| 1921 | 310 | +14.8% |
| 1930 | 270 | −12.9% |
| 1950 | 182 | −32.6% |
| 1961 | 183 | +0.5% |
| 1970 | 140 | −23.5% |
| 1980 | 122 | −12.9% |
| 1991 | 99 | −18.9% |
| 2001 | 97 | −2.0% |
| 2011 | 115 | +18.6% |
| 2021 | 126 | +9.6% |
Source: Censuses
