= Vysoké Studnice =

- Municipality
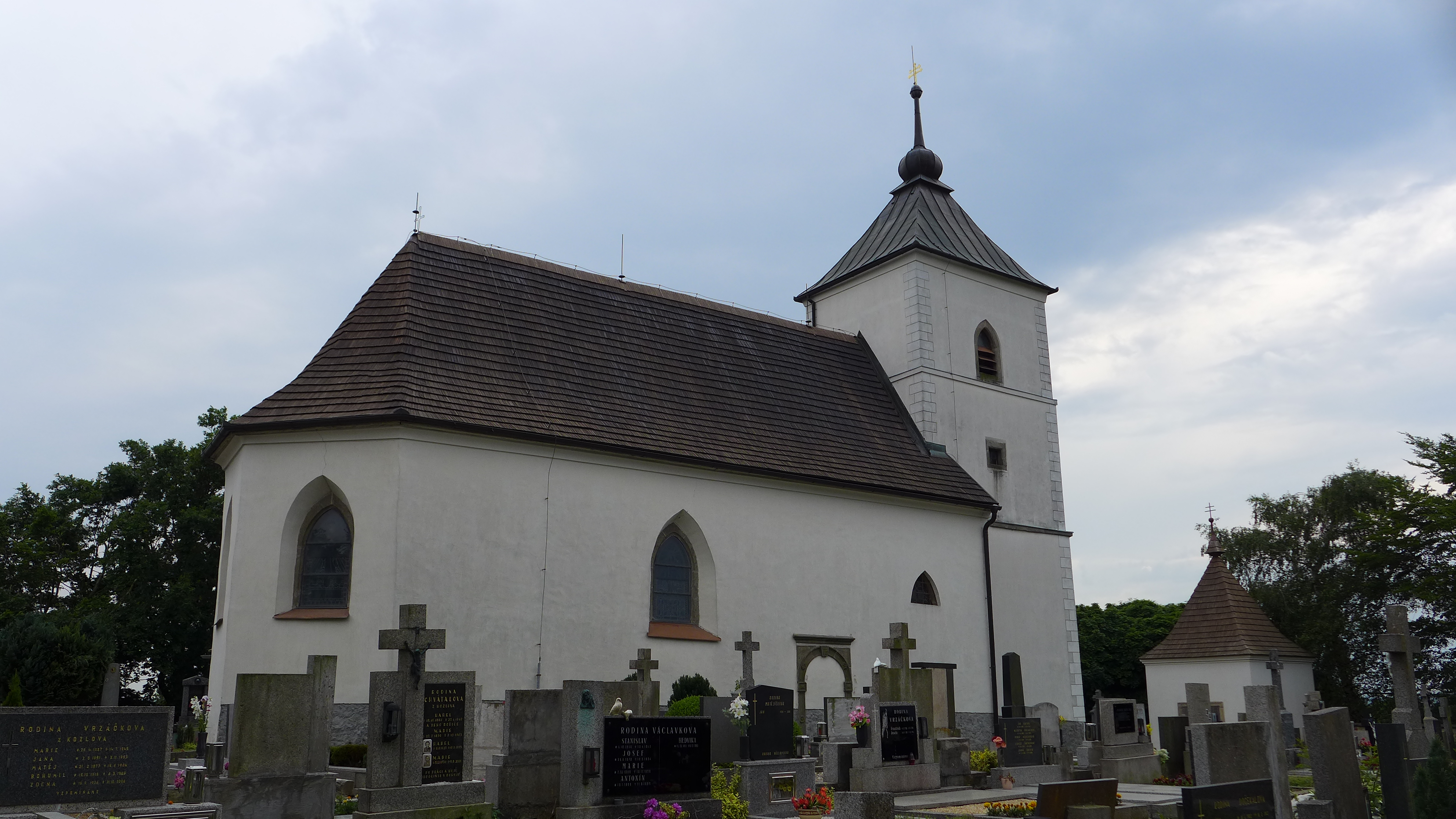
- Church of the Holy Trinity

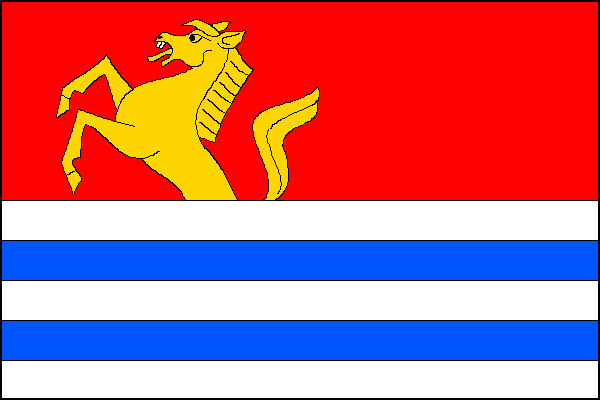
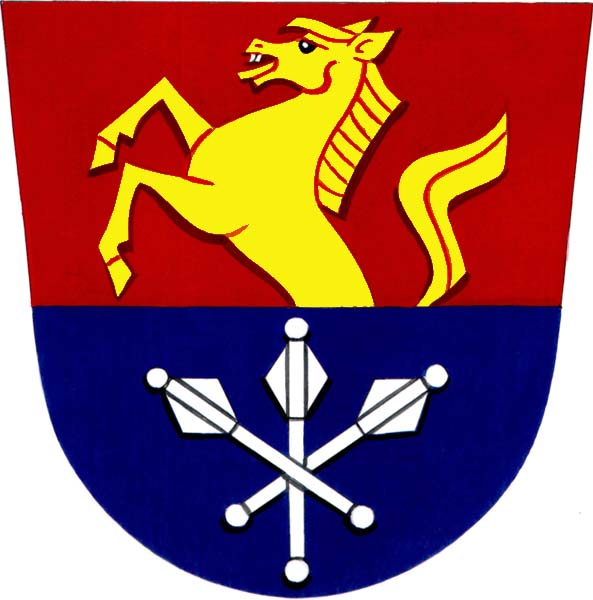
- Flag Coat of arms

- Location in the Czech Republic
- Coordinates: 49°23′39″N 15°43′49″E
- Country: Czech Republic
- Region: Vysočina
- District: Jihlava
- First mentioned: 1342

Area
  - Total: 6.65 km^{2} (2.57 sq mi)
- Elevation: 568 m (1,864 ft)

Population (2026-01-01)
  - Total: 425
  - Density: 63.9/km^{2} (166/sq mi)
- Time zone: UTC+1 (CET)
  - Summer (DST): UTC+2 (CEST)
- Postal code: 588 21
- Website: www.vysokestudnice.eu

Vysoké Studnice (Czech pronunciation: [ˈvɪsokɛː ˈstuɟɲɪtsɛ]) is a municipality and village in Jihlava District in the Vysočina Region of the Czech Republic. It has about 400 inhabitants.

Vysoké Studnice lies approximately 11 kilometres (7 mi) east of Jihlava and 122 km (76 mi) south-east of Prague.

== Demographics ==
Historical population
Year	Pop.	±%
1869	360	—
1880	395	+9.7%
1890	491	+24.3%
1900	490	−0.2%
1910	448	−8.6%
1921	456	+1.8%
1930	483	+5.9%
1950	365	−24.4%
1961	400	+9.6%
1970	360	−10.0%
1980	343	−4.7%
1991	330	−3.8%
2001	339	+2.7%
2011	399	+17.7%
2021	407	+2.0%
Source: Censuses
