= Bartoušov =

- Municipality
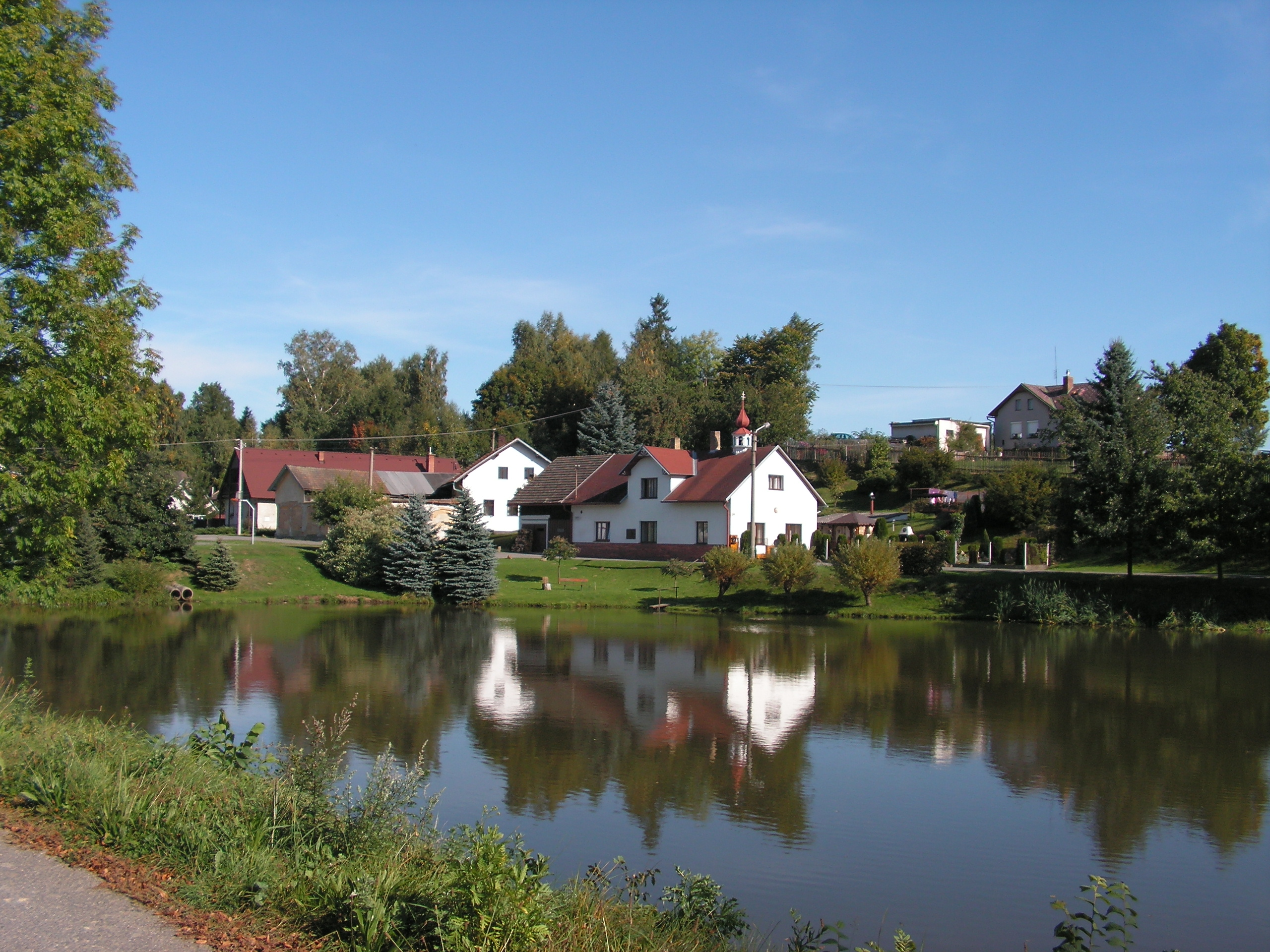
- Centre of Bartoušov

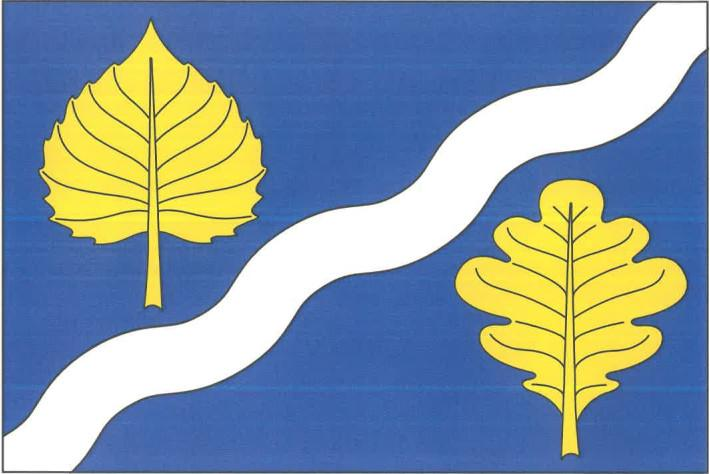
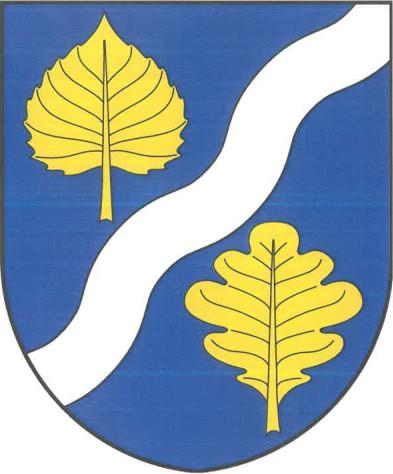
- Flag Coat of arms

- Location in the Czech Republic
- Coordinates: 49°34′52″N 15°38′49″E
- Country: Czech Republic
- Region: Vysočina
- District: Havlíčkův Brod
- First mentioned: 1281

Area
  - Total: 5.92 km^{2} (2.29 sq mi)
- Elevation: 474 m (1,555 ft)

Population (2026-01-01)
  - Total: 195
  - Density: 32.9/km^{2} (85.3/sq mi)
- Time zone: UTC+1 (CET)
  - Summer (DST): UTC+2 (CEST)
- Postal code: 580 01
- Website: www.bartousov.cz

Bartoušov (Czech pronunciation: [ˈbartouʃof]) is a municipality and village in Havlíčkův Brod District in the Vysočina Region of the Czech Republic. It has about 200 inhabitants.

Bartoušov lies approximately 6 kilometres (4 mi) south-east of Havlíčkův Brod, 21 km (13 mi) north of Jihlava, and 105 km (65 mi) south-east of Prague.

== Demographics ==
Historical population
Year	Pop.	±%
1869	266	—
1880	261	−1.9%
1890	276	+5.7%
1900	277	+0.4%
1910	252	−9.0%
1921	264	+4.8%
1930	338	+28.0%
1950	243	−28.1%
1961	248	+2.1%
1970	221	−10.9%
1980	183	−17.2%
1991	148	−19.1%
2001	152	+2.7%
2011	175	+15.1%
2021	155	−11.4%
Source: Censuses
