= Věžnička =

- Municipality
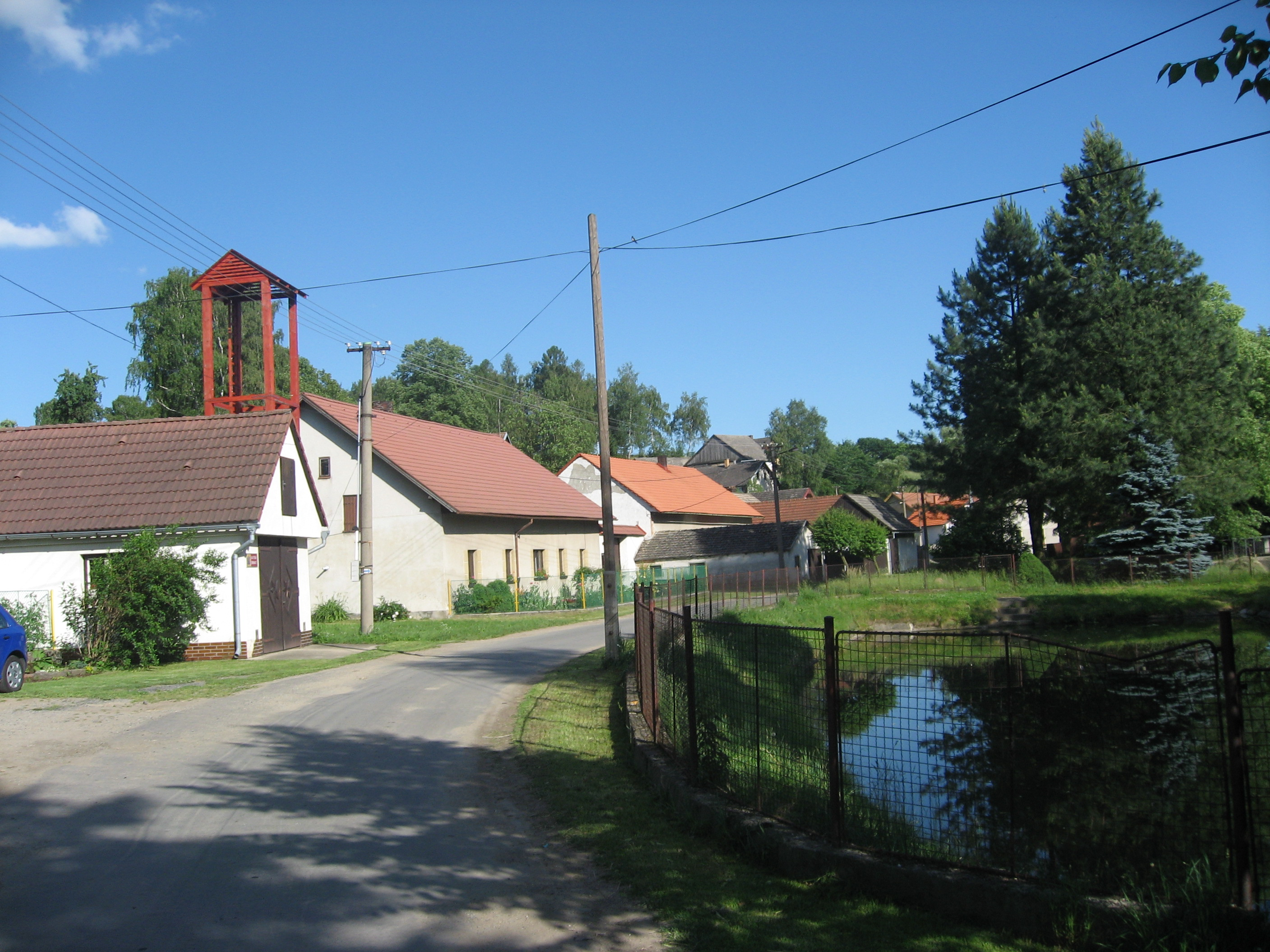
- Centre of Věžnička

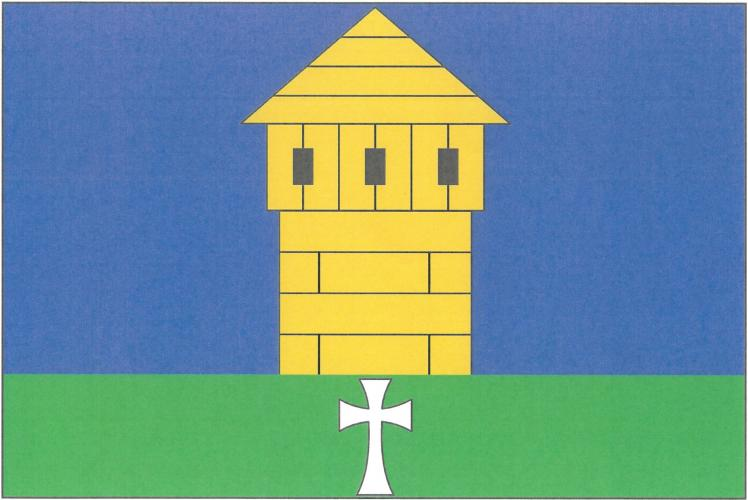
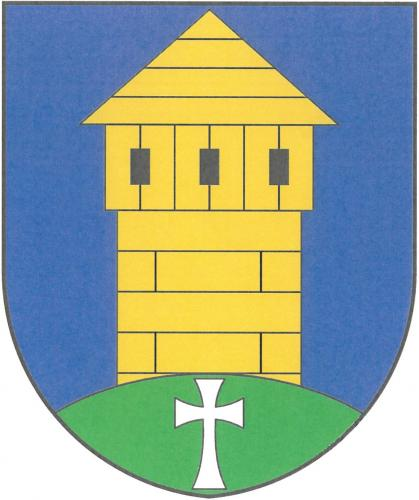
- Flag Coat of arms

- Location in the Czech Republic
- Coordinates: 49°27′35″N 15°42′20″E
- Country: Czech Republic
- Region: Vysočina
- District: Jihlava
- First mentioned: 1502

Area
  - Total: 4.51 km^{2} (1.74 sq mi)
- Elevation: 490 m (1,610 ft)

Population (2026-01-01)
  - Total: 149
  - Density: 33.0/km^{2} (85.6/sq mi)
- Time zone: UTC+1 (CET)
  - Summer (DST): UTC+2 (CEST)
- Postal code: 588 13
- Website: www.veznicka.cz

Věžnička (Czech pronunciation: [ˈvjɛʒɲɪtʃka]) is a municipality and village in Jihlava District in the Vysočina Region of the Czech Republic. It has about 100 inhabitants.

== Demographics ==
Historical population
Year	Pop.	±%
1869	224	—
1880	225	+0.4%
1890	218	−3.1%
1900	238	+9.2%
1910	252	+5.9%
1921	255	+1.2%
1930	253	−0.8%
1950	185	−26.9%
1961	188	+1.6%
1970	159	−15.4%
1980	138	−13.2%
1991	118	−14.5%
2001	119	+0.8%
2011	134	+12.6%
2021	134	+0.0%
Source: Censuses
