= Vysoká (Havlíčkův Brod District) =

- Municipality
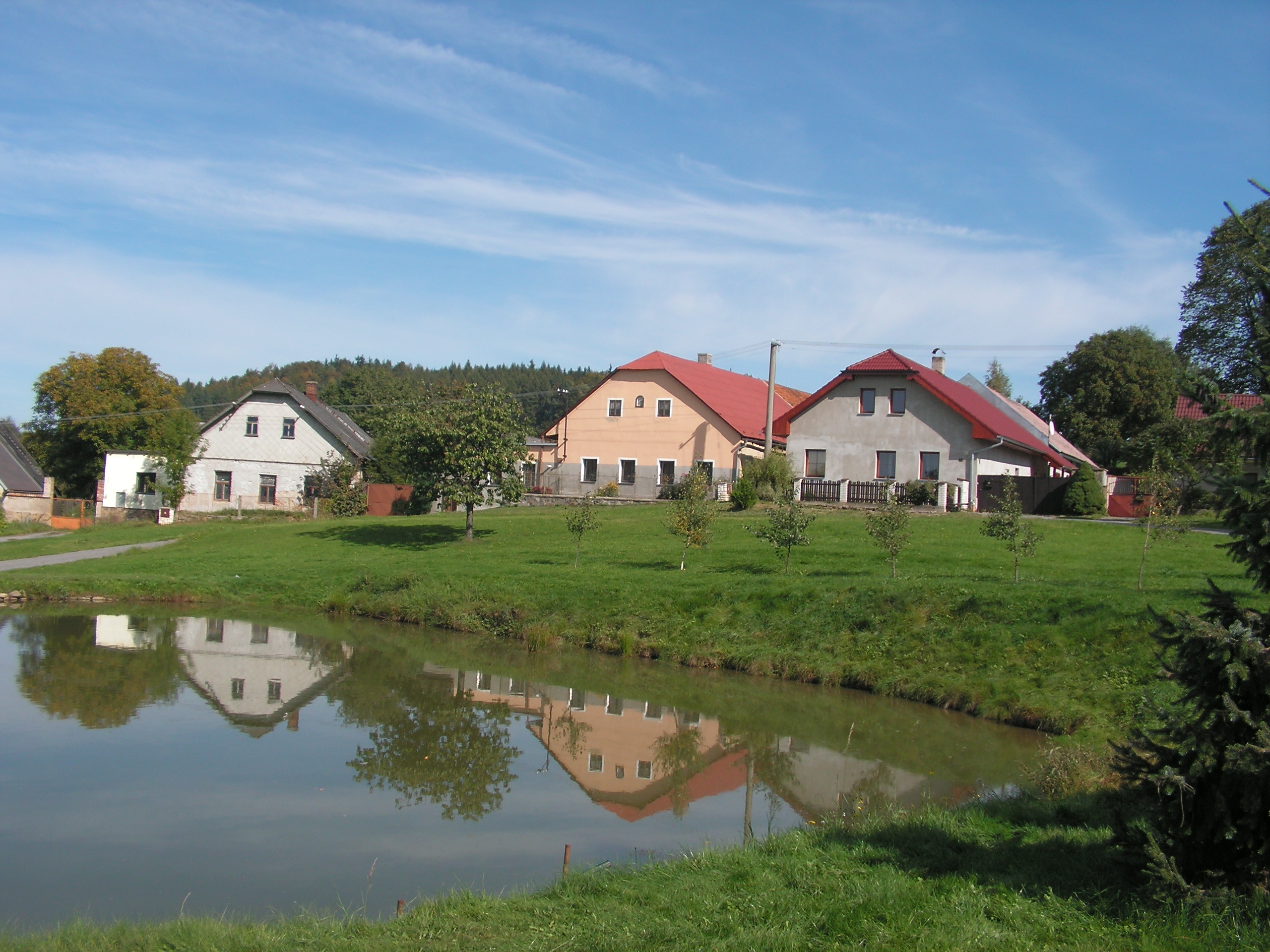
- Pond in the centre of Vysoká

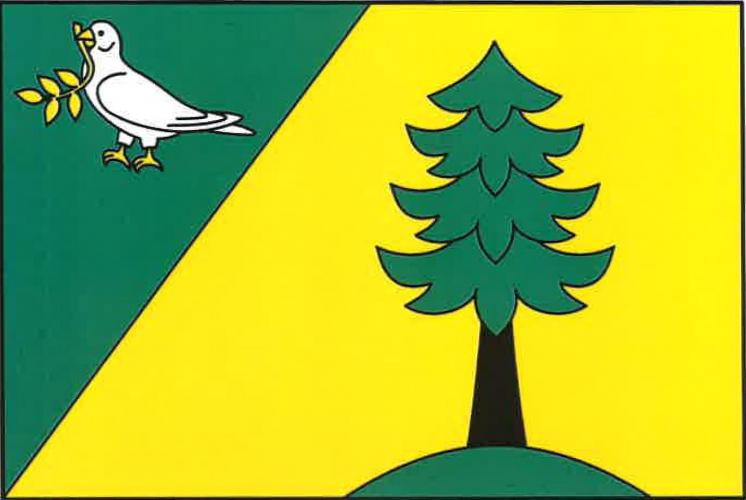
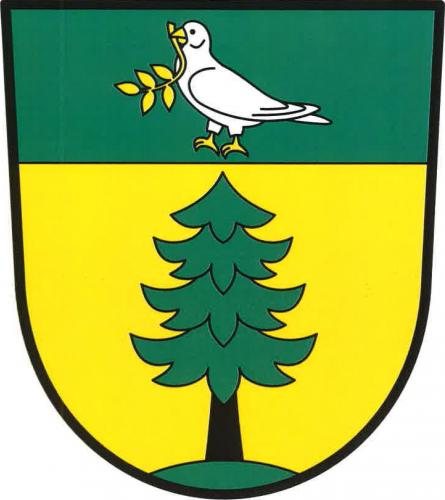
- Flag Coat of arms

- Location in the Czech Republic
- Coordinates: 49°33′44″N 15°37′20″E
- Country: Czech Republic
- Region: Vysočina
- District: Havlíčkův Brod
- First mentioned: 1308

Area
  - Total: 8.05 km^{2} (3.11 sq mi)
- Elevation: 520 m (1,710 ft)

Population (2026-01-01)
  - Total: 277
  - Density: 34.4/km^{2} (89.1/sq mi)
- Time zone: UTC+1 (CET)
  - Summer (DST): UTC+2 (CEST)
- Postal code: 580 01
- Website: www.vysokahb.cz

Vysoká is a municipality and village in Havlíčkův Brod District in the Vysočina Region of the Czech Republic. It has about 300 inhabitants.

Vysoká lies approximately 6 kilometres (4 mi) south-east of Havlíčkův Brod, 19 km (12 mi) north of Jihlava, and 104 km (65 mi) south-east of Prague.

== Demographics ==
Historical population
Year	Pop.	±%
1869	289	—
1880	319	+10.4%
1890	308	−3.4%
1900	302	−1.9%
1910	316	+4.6%
1921	316	+0.0%
1930	303	−4.1%
1950	231	−23.8%
1961	250	+8.2%
1970	171	−31.6%
1980	123	−28.1%
1991	86	−30.1%
2001	86	+0.0%
2011	185	+115.1%
2021	249	+34.6%
Source: Censuses
