= Věžnice (Havlíčkův Brod District) =

- Municipality
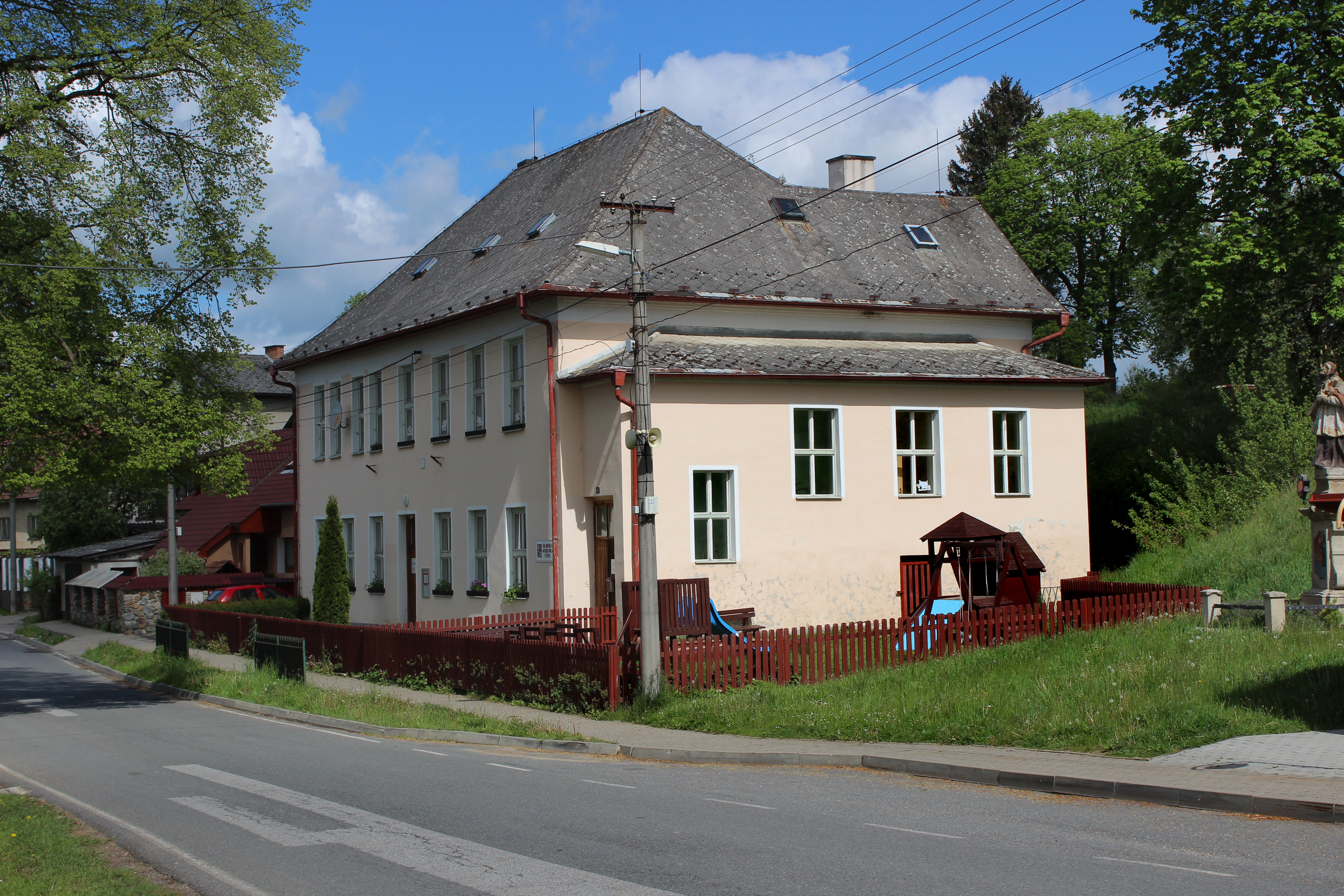
- Primary school

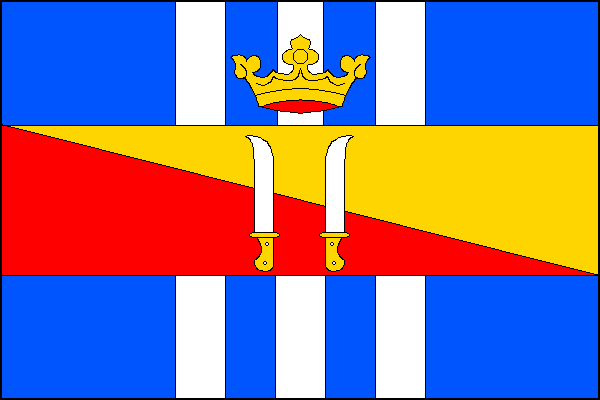
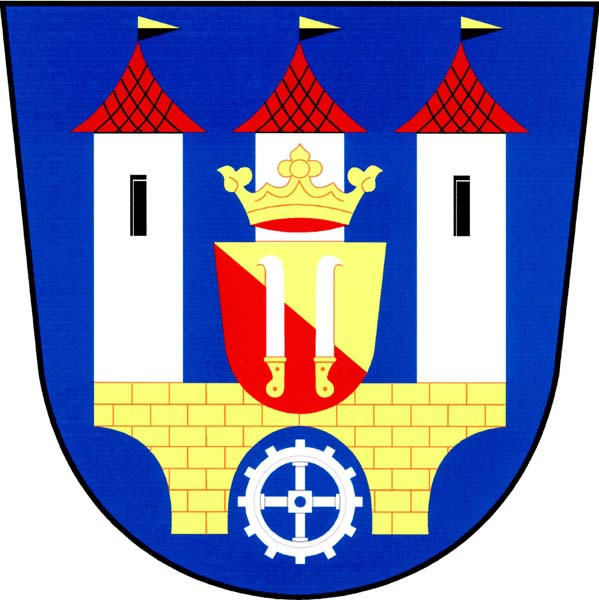
- Flag Coat of arms

- Location in the Czech Republic
- Coordinates: 49°30′55″N 15°41′40″E
- Country: Czech Republic
- Region: Vysočina
- District: Havlíčkův Brod
- First mentioned: 1356

Area
  - Total: 13.87 km^{2} (5.36 sq mi)
- Elevation: 445 m (1,460 ft)

Population (2026-01-01)
  - Total: 453
  - Density: 32.7/km^{2} (84.6/sq mi)
- Time zone: UTC+1 (CET)
  - Summer (DST): UTC+2 (CEST)
- Postal code: 582 52
- Website: www.obecveznice.cz

Věžnice is a municipality and village in Havlíčkův Brod District in the Vysočina Region of the Czech Republic. It has about 500 inhabitants.

Věžnice lies approximately 13 kilometres (8 mi) south-east of Havlíčkův Brod, 15 km (9 mi) north-east of Jihlava, and 111 km (69 mi) south-east of Prague.

== Demographics ==
Historical population
Year	Pop.	±%
1869	566	—
1880	559	−1.2%
1890	551	−1.4%
1900	599	+8.7%
1910	596	−0.5%
1921	595	−0.2%
1930	599	+0.7%
1950	414	−30.9%
1961	413	−0.2%
1970	403	−2.4%
1980	421	+4.5%
1991	421	+0.0%
2001	402	−4.5%
2011	418	+4.0%
2021	410	−1.9%
Source: Censuses
