= Věžnice (Jihlava District) =

- Municipality
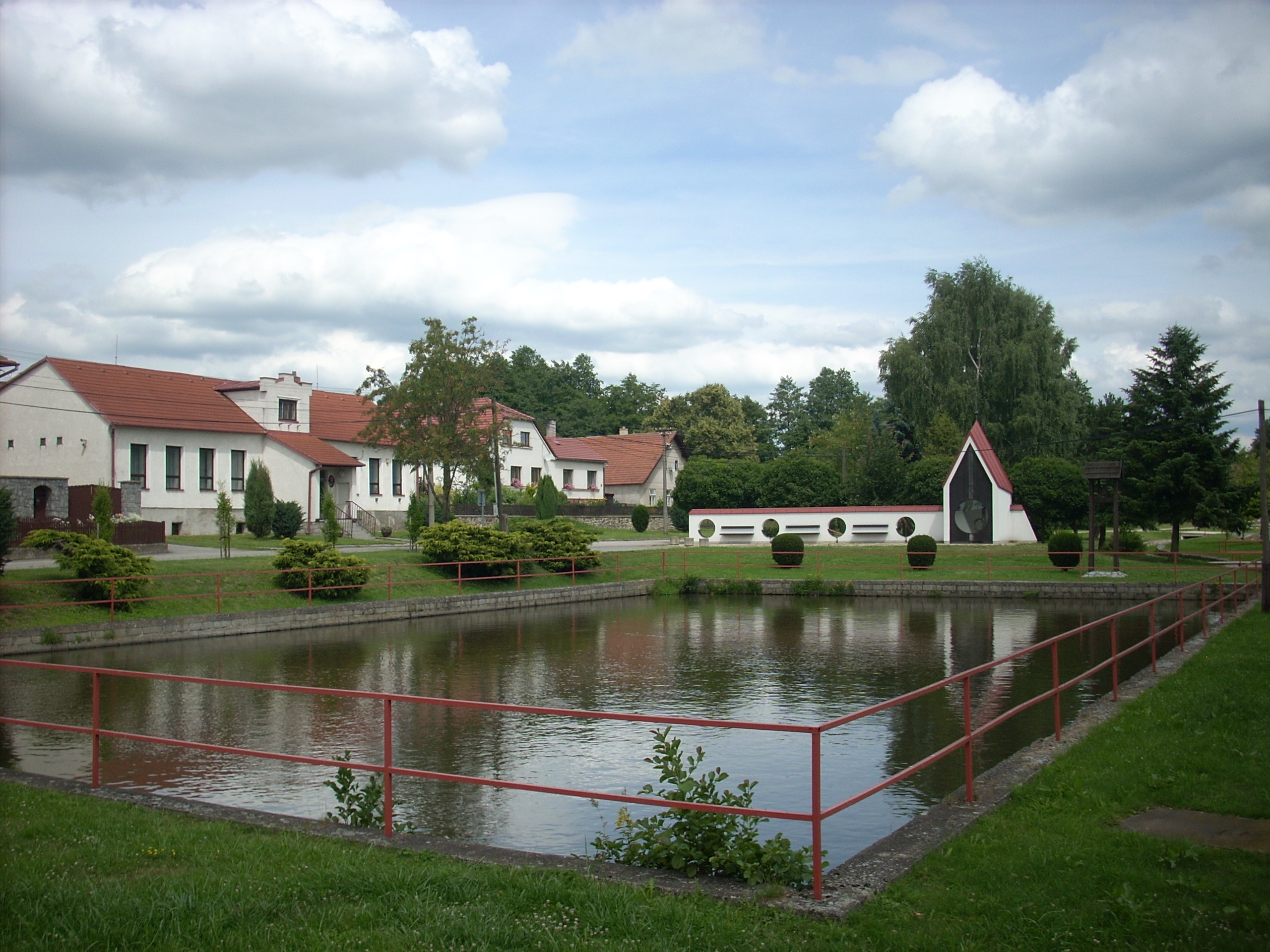
- Centre of Věžnice

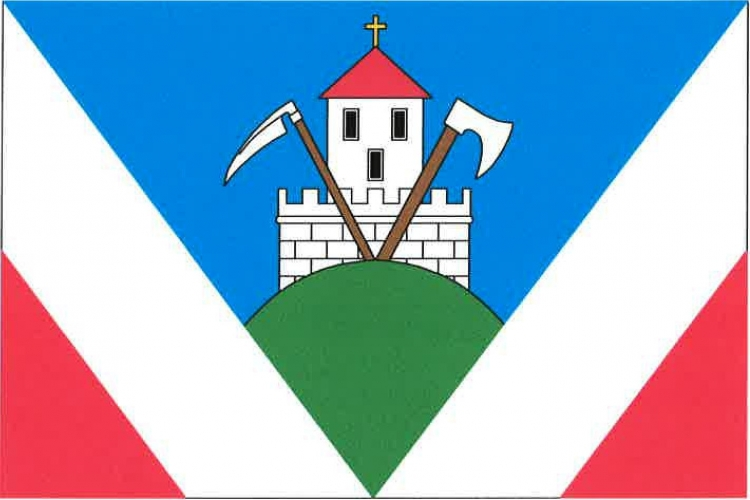
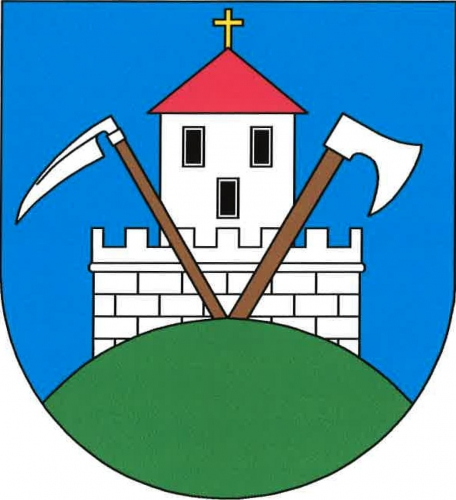
- Flag Coat of arms

- Location in the Czech Republic
- Coordinates: 49°24′25″N 15°45′32″E
- Country: Czech Republic
- Region: Vysočina
- District: Jihlava
- First mentioned: 1509

Area
  - Total: 4.88 km^{2} (1.88 sq mi)
- Elevation: 565 m (1,854 ft)

Population (2026-01-01)
  - Total: 157
  - Density: 32.2/km^{2} (83.3/sq mi)
- Time zone: UTC+1 (CET)
  - Summer (DST): UTC+2 (CEST)
- Postal code: 588 27
- Website: www.obecveznice.eu

Věžnice (Czech pronunciation: [ˈvjɛʒɲɪtsɛ]) is a municipality and village in Jihlava District in the Vysočina Region of the Czech Republic. It has about 200 inhabitants.

Věžnice lies approximately 13 kilometres (8 mi) east of Jihlava and 123 km (76 mi) south-east of Prague.

== Demographics ==
Historical population
Year	Pop.	±%
1869	274	—
1880	308	+12.4%
1890	327	+6.2%
1900	283	−13.5%
1910	281	−0.7%
1921	295	+5.0%
1930	294	−0.3%
1950	223	−24.1%
1961	211	−5.4%
1970	198	−6.2%
1980	169	−14.6%
1991	156	−7.7%
2001	150	−3.8%
2011	147	−2.0%
2021	148	+0.7%
Source: Censuses
