= Vanůvek =

- Municipality
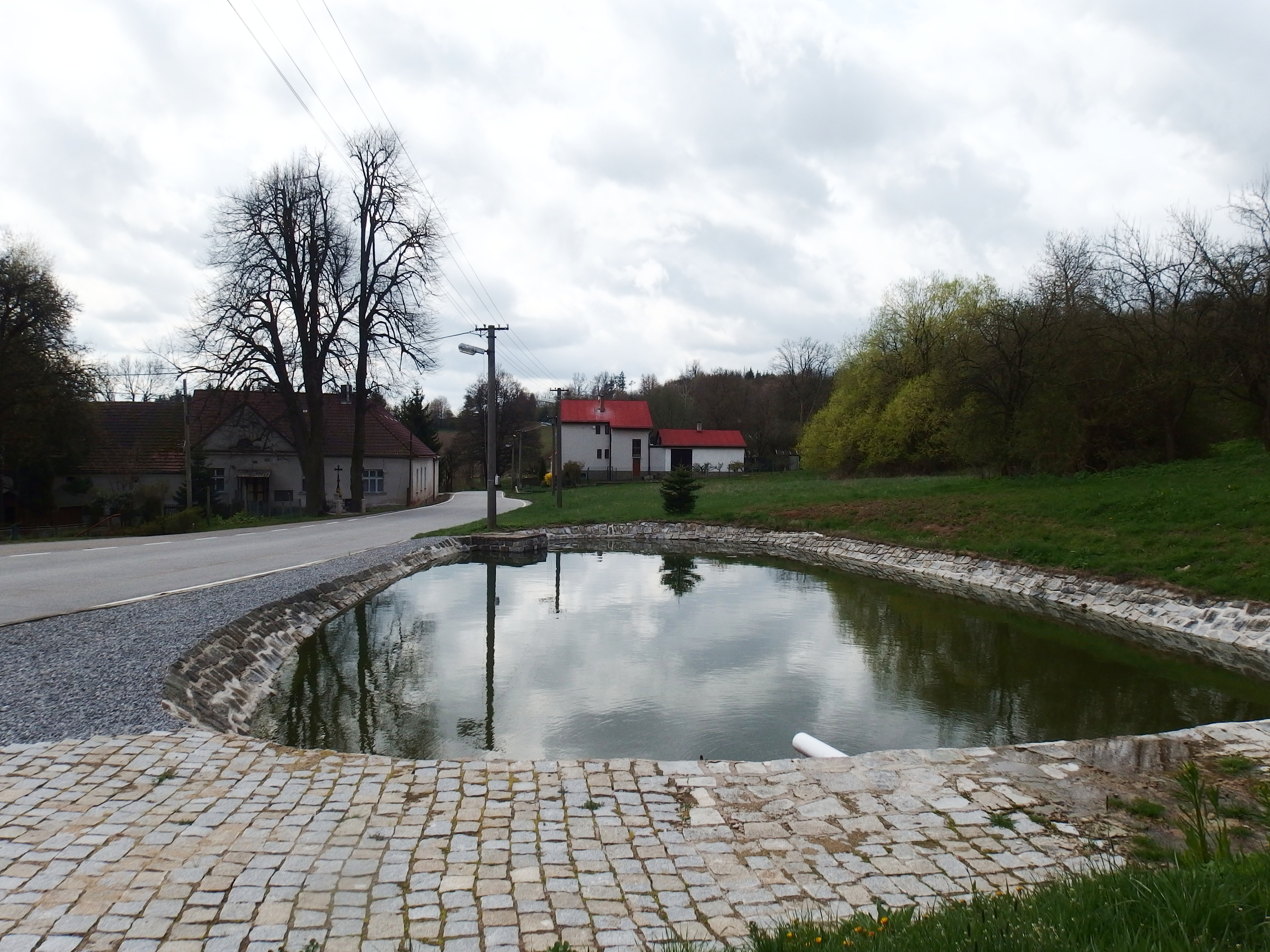
- Water reservoir

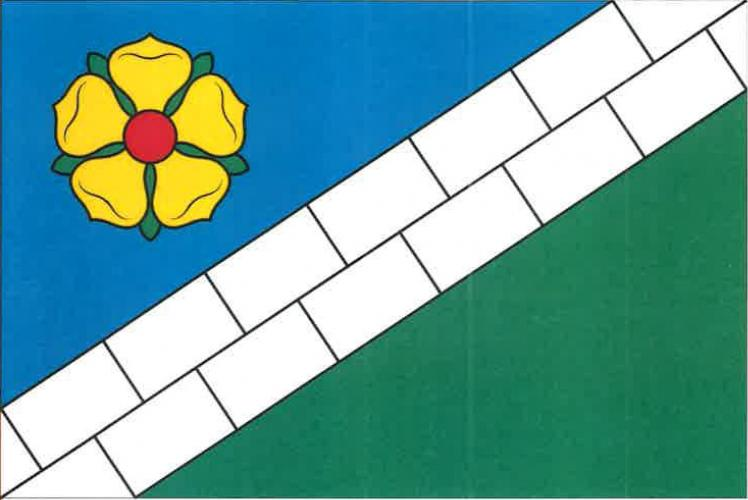
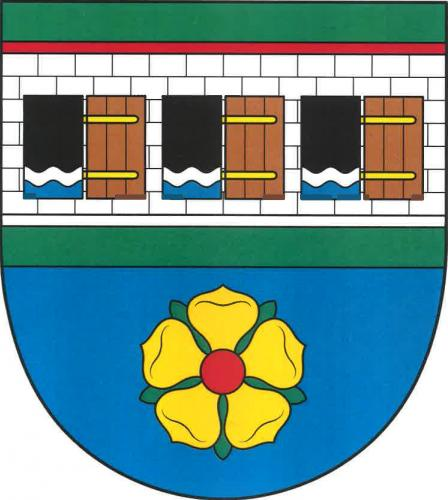
- Flag Coat of arms

- Location in the Czech Republic
- Coordinates: 49°13′21″N 15°25′22″E
- Country: Czech Republic
- Region: Vysočina
- District: Jihlava
- First mentioned: 1580

Area
  - Total: 2.56 km^{2} (0.99 sq mi)
- Elevation: 600 m (2,000 ft)

Population (2026-01-01)
  - Total: 40
  - Density: 16/km^{2} (40/sq mi)
- Time zone: UTC+1 (CET)
  - Summer (DST): UTC+2 (CEST)
- Postal code: 588 56
- Website: www.obecvanuvek.cz

Vanůvek (Czech pronunciation: [ˈvanuːvɛk]) is a municipality and village in Jihlava District in the Vysočina Region of the Czech Republic. It has about 40 inhabitants.

Vanůvek lies approximately 23 kilometres (14 mi) south-west of Jihlava and 121 km (75 mi) south-east of Prague.

== Demographics ==
Historical population
Year	Pop.	±%
1869	98	—
1880	102	+4.1%
1890	96	−5.9%
1900	100	+4.2%
1910	96	−4.0%
1921	106	+10.4%
1930	124	+17.0%
1950	79	−36.3%
1961	62	−21.5%
1970	64	+3.2%
1980	49	−23.4%
1991	41	−16.3%
2001	35	−14.6%
2011	37	+5.7%
2021	35	−5.4%
Source: Censuses
