= Vanov =

- Municipality
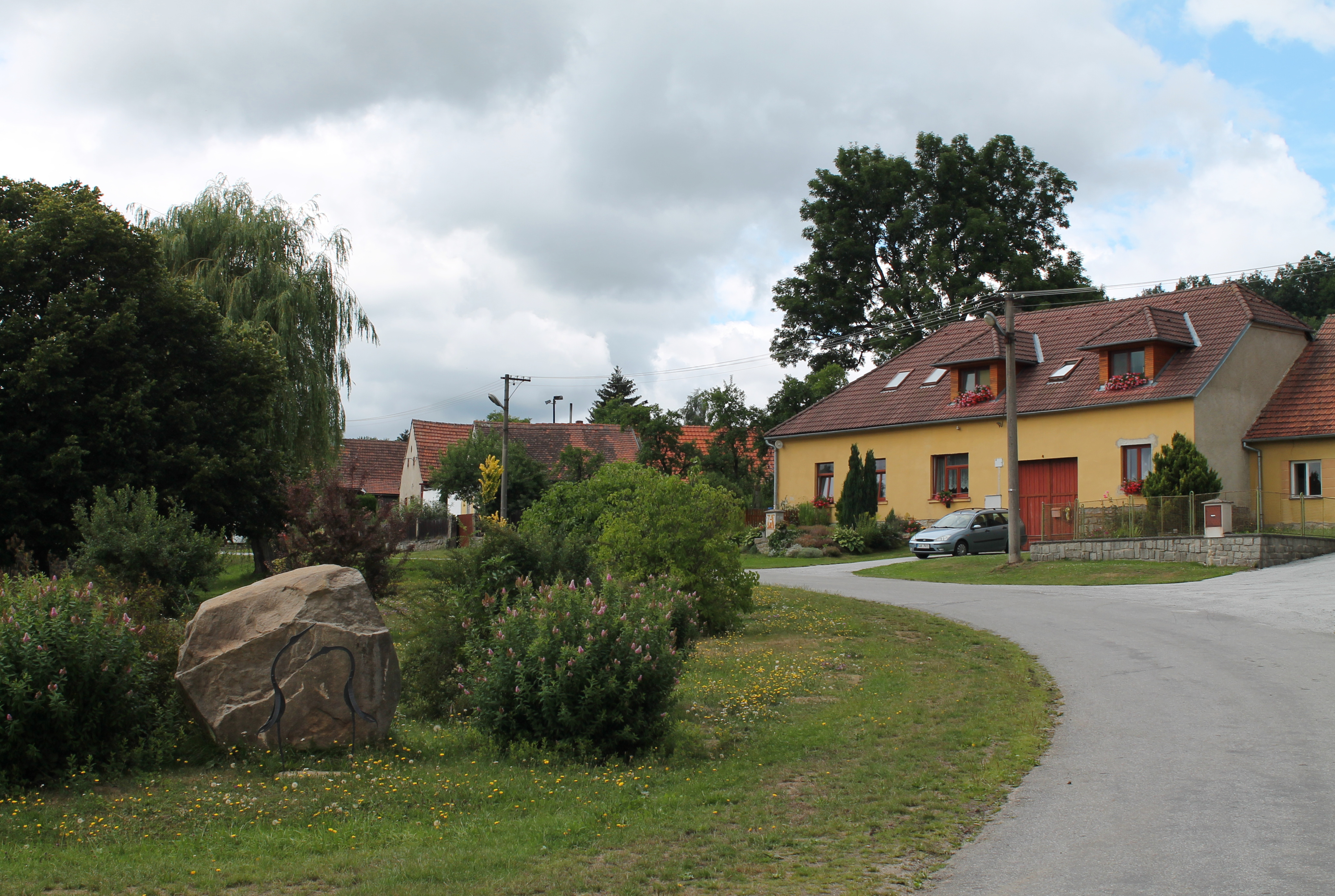
- Centre of Vanov

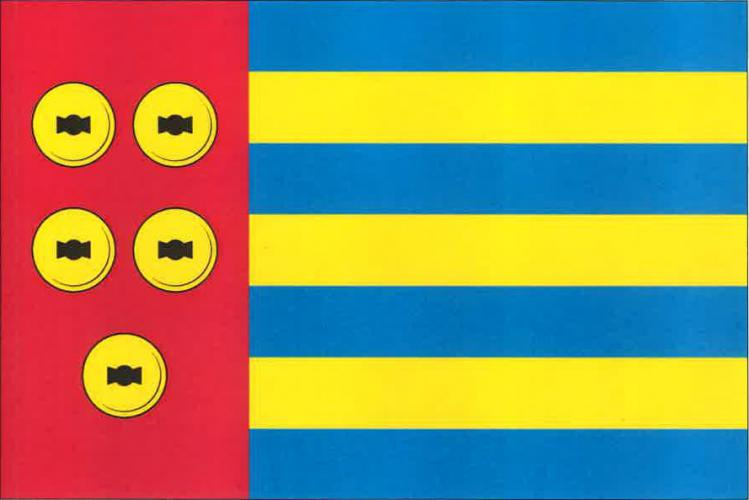
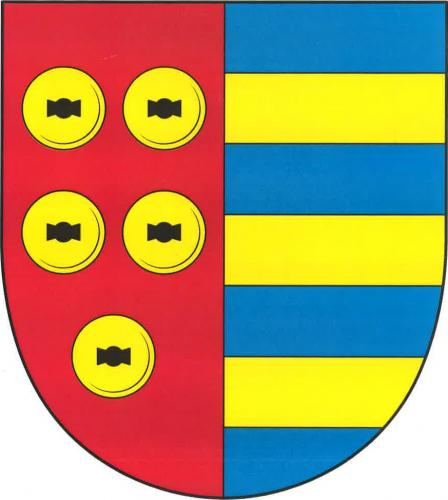
- Flag Coat of arms

- Location in the Czech Republic
- Coordinates: 49°12′28″N 15°24′49″E
- Country: Czech Republic
- Region: Vysočina
- District: Jihlava
- First mentioned: 1580

Area
  - Total: 4.27 km^{2} (1.65 sq mi)
- Elevation: 587 m (1,926 ft)

Population (2026-01-01)
  - Total: 82
  - Density: 19/km^{2} (50/sq mi)
- Time zone: UTC+1 (CET)
  - Summer (DST): UTC+2 (CEST)
- Postal codes: 588 56
- Website: www.obec-vanov.cz

Vanov (Czech pronunciation: [ˈvanof]) is a municipality and village in Jihlava District in the Vysočina Region of the Czech Republic. It has about 80 inhabitants.

Vanov lies approximately 25 kilometres (16 mi) south-west of Jihlava and 122 km (76 mi) south-east of Prague.

== Demographics ==
Historical population
Year	Pop.	±%
1869	212	—
1880	215	+1.4%
1890	253	+17.7%
1900	222	−12.3%
1910	216	−2.7%
1921	222	+2.8%
1930	198	−10.8%
1950	148	−25.3%
1961	152	+2.7%
1970	129	−15.1%
1980	130	+0.8%
1991	94	−27.7%
2001	90	−4.3%
2011	97	+7.8%
2021	89	−8.2%
Source: Censuses
