= Zdeňkov =

- Municipality
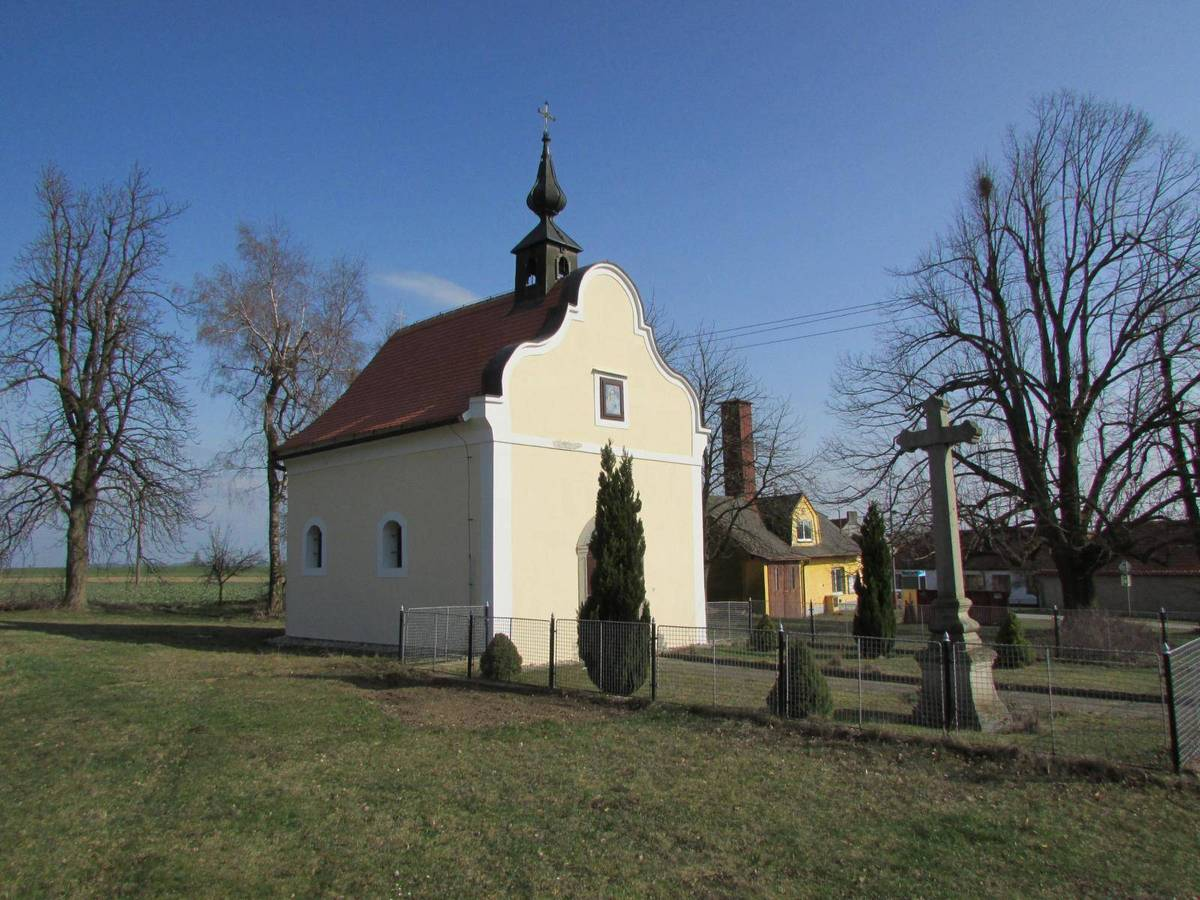
- Chapel of the Visitation of the Virgin Mary

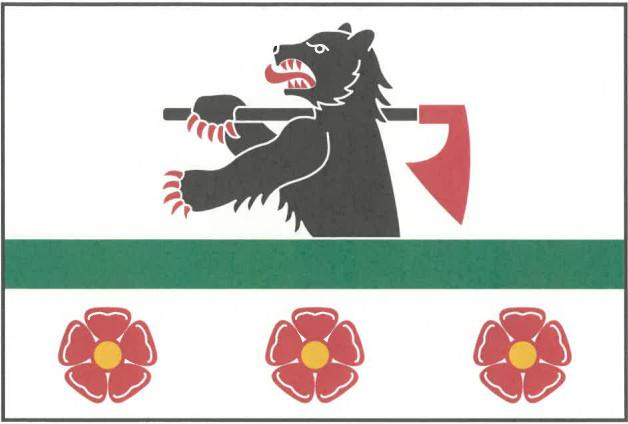
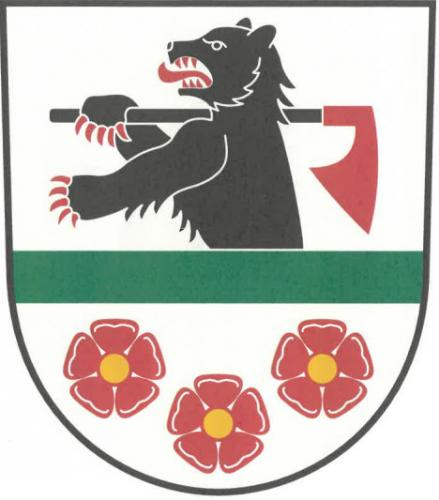
- Flag Coat of arms

- Location in the Czech Republic
- Coordinates: 49°8′24″N 15°37′12″E
- Country: Czech Republic
- Region: Vysočina
- District: Jihlava
- First mentioned: 1655

Area
  - Total: 4.00 km^{2} (1.54 sq mi)
- Elevation: 634 m (2,080 ft)

Population (2026-01-01)
  - Total: 62
  - Density: 15/km^{2} (40/sq mi)
- Time zone: UTC+1 (CET)
  - Summer (DST): UTC+2 (CEST)
- Postal code: 588 56
- Website: www.zdenkov.cz

Zdeňkov (Czech pronunciation: [ˈzdɛɲkof]) is a municipality and village in Jihlava District in the Vysočina Region of the Czech Republic. It has about 60 inhabitants.

Zdeňkov lies approximately 29 kilometres (18 mi) south of Jihlava and 136 km (85 mi) south-east of Prague.

== Demographics ==
Historical population
Year	Pop.	±%
1869	233	—
1880	220	−5.6%
1890	209	−5.0%
1900	216	+3.3%
1910	212	−1.9%
1921	221	+4.2%
1930	202	−8.6%
1950	141	−30.2%
1961	140	−0.7%
1970	121	−13.6%
1980	98	−19.0%
1991	71	−27.6%
2001	78	+9.9%
2011	50	−35.9%
2021	48	−4.0%
Source: Censuses
