= Vápovice =

- Municipality
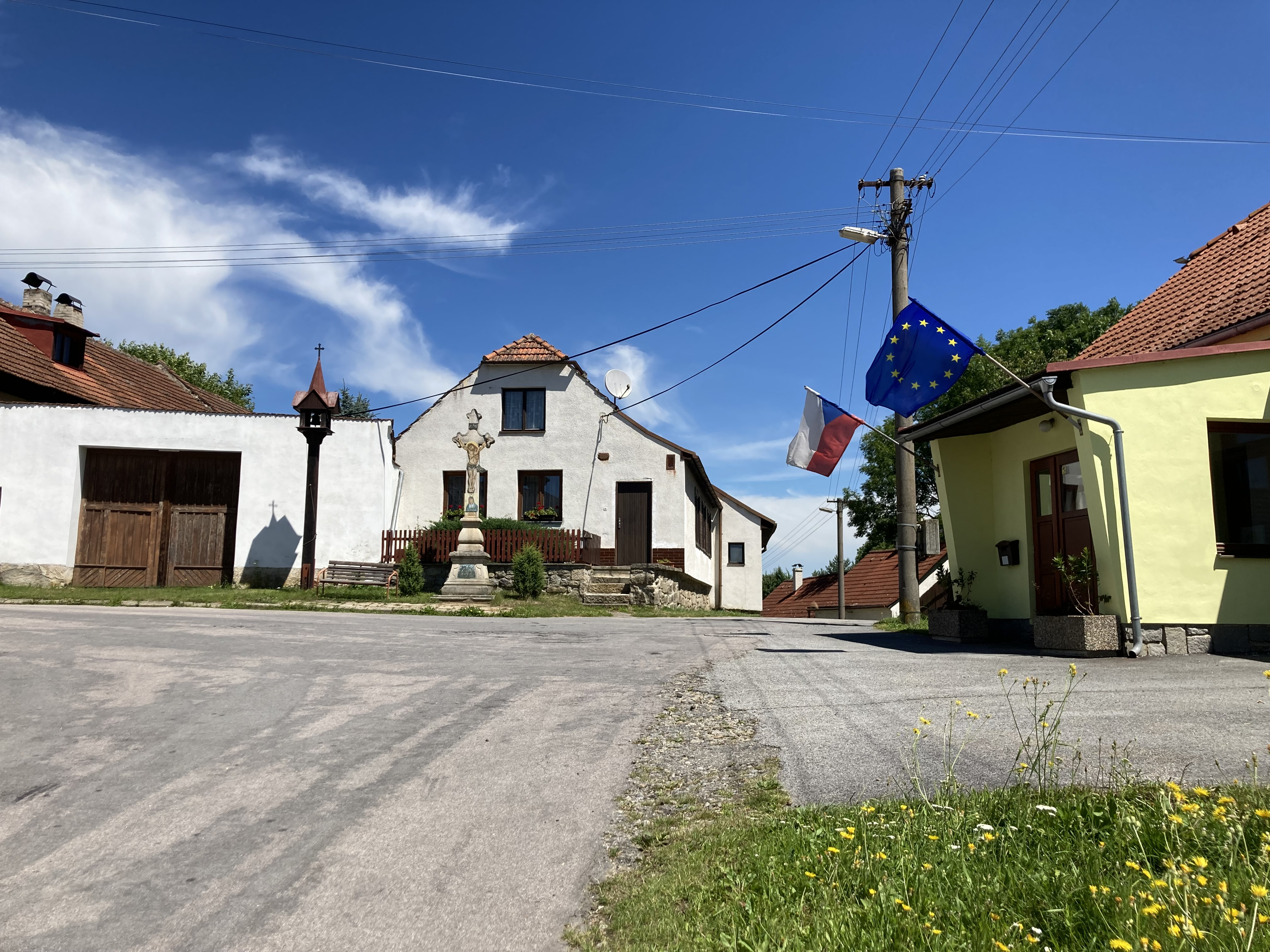
- Centre of Vápovice

- Location in the Czech Republic
- Coordinates: 49°9′17″N 15°34′51″E
- Country: Czech Republic
- Region: Vysočina
- District: Jihlava
- First mentioned: 1529

Area
  - Total: 1.99 km^{2} (0.77 sq mi)
- Elevation: 544 m (1,785 ft)

Population (2026-01-01)
  - Total: 40
  - Density: 20/km^{2} (52/sq mi)
- Time zone: UTC+1 (CET)
  - Summer (DST): UTC+2 (CEST)
- Postal code: 588 56

Vápovice (Czech pronunciation: [ˈvaːpovɪtsɛ]) is a municipality and village in Jihlava District in the Vysočina Region of the Czech Republic. It has about 40 inhabitants.

Vápovice lies approximately 26 kilometres (16 mi) south of Jihlava and 132 km (82 mi) south-east of Prague.

== Demographics ==
Historical population
Year	Pop.	±%
1869	104	—
1880	116	+11.5%
1890	123	+6.0%
1900	112	−8.9%
1910	133	+18.8%
1921	140	+5.3%
1930	143	+2.1%
1950	102	−28.7%
1961	84	−17.6%
1970	72	−14.3%
1980	52	−27.8%
1991	47	−9.6%
2001	53	+12.8%
2011	43	−18.9%
2021	40	−7.0%
Source: Censuses
