= Zbinohy =

- Municipality
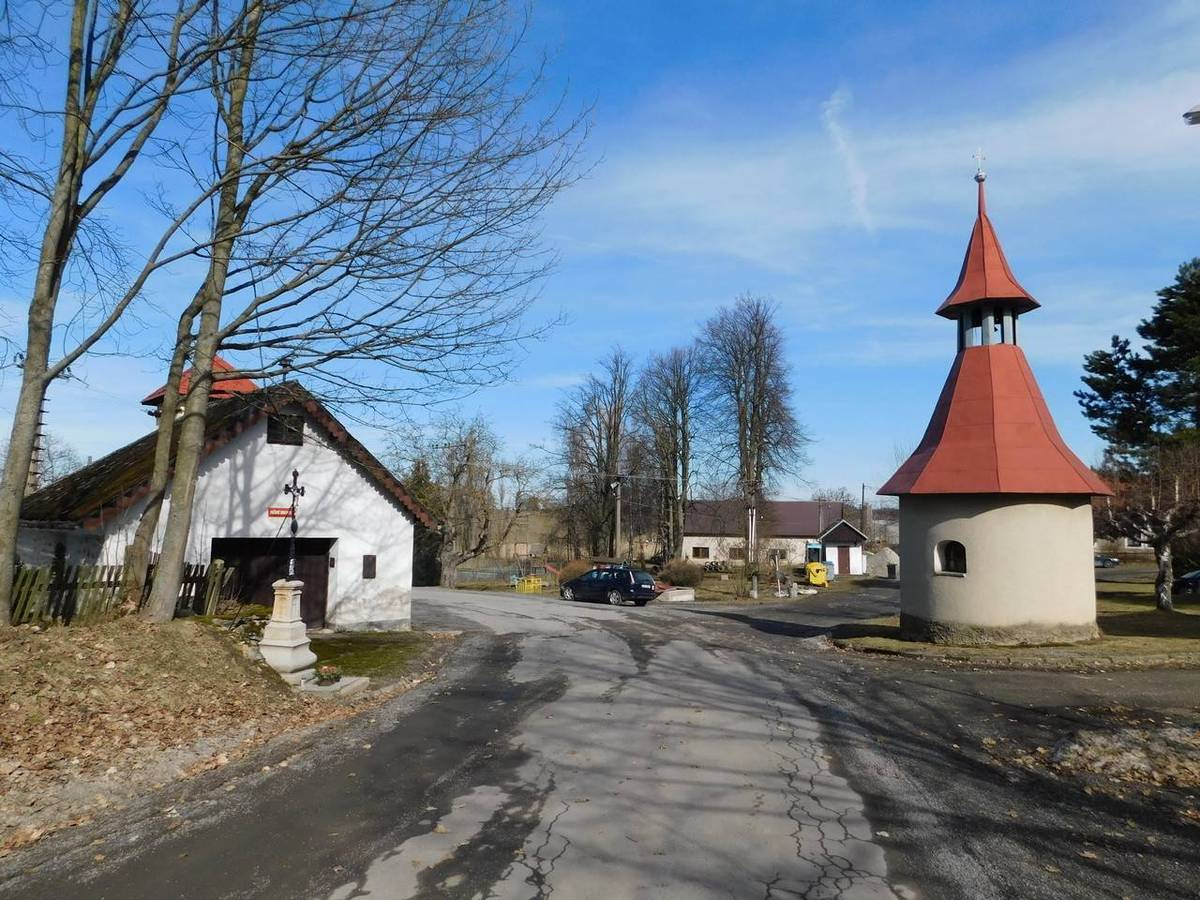
- Centre of Zbinohy

- Location in the Czech Republic
- Coordinates: 49°29′14″N 15°28′50″E
- Country: Czech Republic
- Region: Vysočina
- District: Jihlava
- First mentioned: 1437

Area
  - Total: 3.97 km^{2} (1.53 sq mi)
- Elevation: 646 m (2,119 ft)

Population (2026-01-01)
  - Total: 119
  - Density: 30.0/km^{2} (77.6/sq mi)
- Time zone: UTC+1 (CET)
  - Summer (DST): UTC+2 (CEST)
- Postal code: 588 42
- Website: www.obec-zbinohy.cz

Zbinohy (Czech pronunciation: [ˈzbɪnoɦɪ]) is a municipality and village in Jihlava District in the Vysočina Region of the Czech Republic. It has about 100 inhabitants.

Zbinohy lies approximately 13 kilometres (8 mi) north-west of Jihlava and 102 km (63 mi) south-east of Prague.

== Demographics ==
Historical population
Year	Pop.	±%
1869	257	—
1880	259	+0.8%
1890	209	−19.3%
1900	235	+12.4%
1910	228	−3.0%
1921	225	−1.3%
1930	187	−16.9%
1950	139	−25.7%
1961	133	−4.3%
1970	113	−15.0%
1980	88	−22.1%
1991	57	−35.2%
2001	58	+1.8%
2011	77	+32.8%
2021	100	+29.9%
Source: Censuses
