= Želetavka =

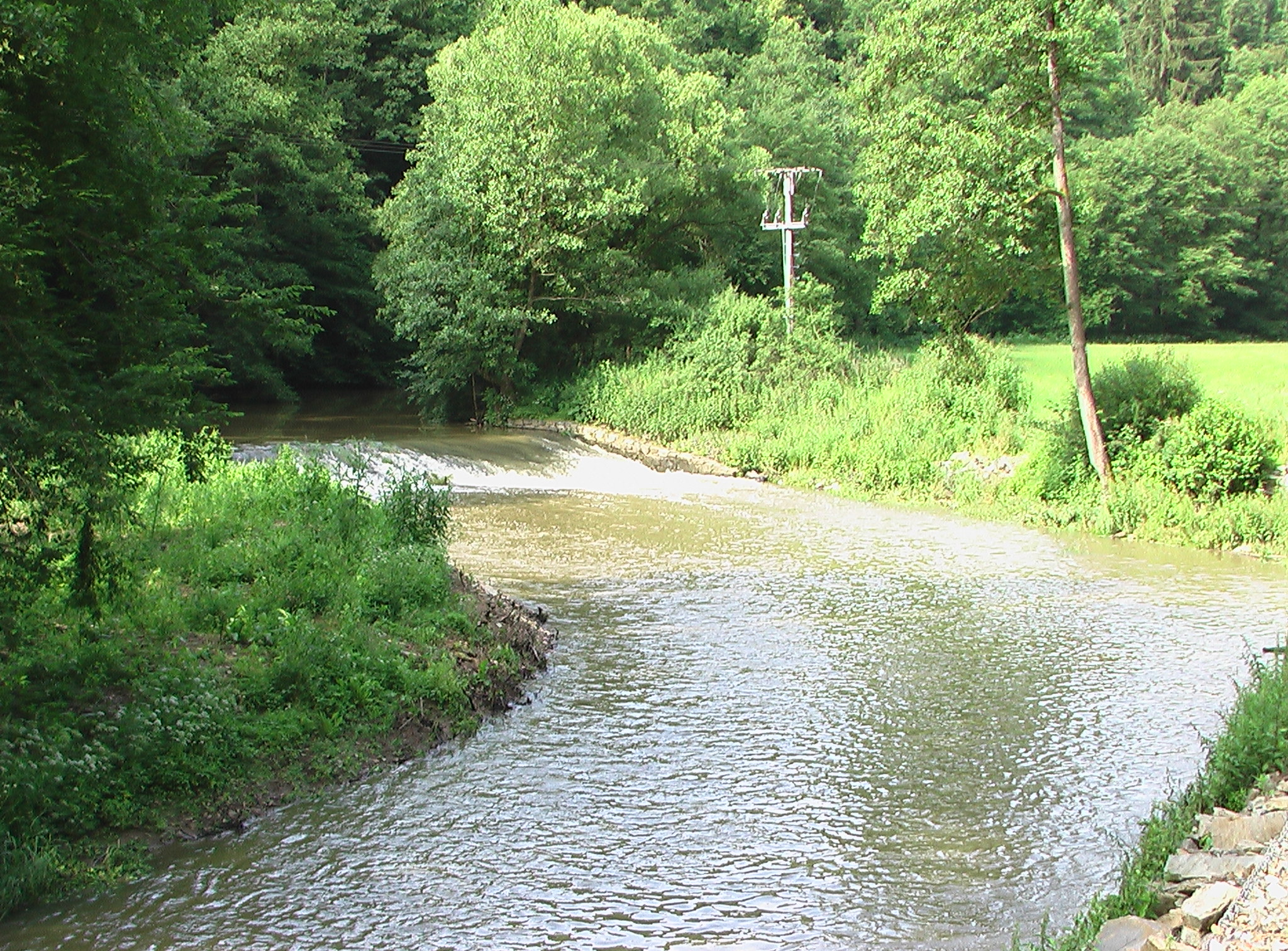
- Lower course of the Želetavka

Location
- Country: Czech Republic
- Regions: Vysočina; South Moravian; South Bohemian

Physical characteristics
- Source
  - location: Želetava, Křižanov Highlands
  - coordinates: 49°10′21″N 15°39′29″E
  - elevation: 657 m (2,156 ft)
- Mouth
  - location: Thaya
  - coordinates: 48°56′19″N 15°42′10″E
  - elevation: 300 m (980 ft)
- Length: 55.8 km (34.7 mi)
- Basin size: 367.6 km^{2} (141.9 sq mi)
- Discharge
  - average: 1.11 m^{3}/s (39 cu ft/s) near estuary

Basin features
- Progression: Thaya→ Morava→ Danube→ Black Sea

The Želetavka (Czech pronunciation: [ˈʒɛlɛtafka]) is a river in the Czech Republic, a left tributary of the Thaya River. It flows through the South Moravian Region. It is 55.8 km (34.7 mi) long.

== Etymology ==
The river was probably named after the market town of Želetava. However, it is not certain and there is also a hypothesis that the name of the river was derived from the word želeti (meaning 'to cry', referring to its noise) and the market town was named after the river.

== Characteristic ==
The Želetavka originates in the territory of Želetava in the Křižanov Highlands at an elevation of 648 m (2,126 ft) and flows to Bítov, where it enters the Thaya River at an elevation of 300 m (980 ft). It is 55.8 km (34.7 mi) long. Its drainage basin has an area of 367.6 km^{2} (141.9 sq mi).

The longest tributaries of the Želetavka are:

Tributary	Length (km)	Side
Blatnice	19.6	right
Bihanka	17.2	left
Prokopka	7.9	right

== Course ==
The most populous settlement on the river is the town of Jemnice. The river flows through the municipal territories of Želetava, Svojkovice, Jindřichovice, Meziříčko, Krasonice, Radkovice u Budče, Knínice, Budeč, Lomy, Chotěbudice, Jemnice, Radotice, Bačkovice, Dešná, Lubnice, Police, Kostníky, Dešov, Zblovice, Vysočany and Bítov.

== Bodies of water ==
There are 239 bodies of water in the basin area. The largest of them is the fishpond Dešná with an area of 14.9 ha (37 acres), supplied by the Blatnice. Several small reservoirs are fishponds are built on the upper and middle course of the river. The Vranov Reservoir, built on the Thaya River, extends also into the river mouth of the Želetavka.

== See also ==
- List of rivers of the Czech Republic
