= Knínice =

Knínice may refer to places in the Czech Republic:

- Knínice (Blansko District), a market town in the South Moravian Region
- Knínice (Jihlava District), a municipality and village in the Vysočina Region
- Knínice, a village and part of Libouchec in the Ústí nad Labem Region
- Knínice, a village and part of Lovečkovice in the Ústí nad Labem Region
- Knínice, a village and part of Žlutice in the Karlovy Vary Region
- Miroslavské Knínice, a municipality and village in the South Moravian Region
- Moravské Knínice, a municipality and village in the South Moravian Region
- Veverské Knínice, a municipality and village in the South Moravian Region
