= Meziříčko =

Meziříčko may refer to places in the Czech Republic:

- Meziříčko (Třebíč District), a municipality and village in the Vysočina Region
- Meziříčko (Žďár nad Sázavou District), a municipality and village in the Vysočina Region
- Meziříčko, a village and part of Letovice in the South Moravian Region
- Horní Meziříčko, a municipality and village in the South Bohemian Region
