= Radotice =

- Municipality
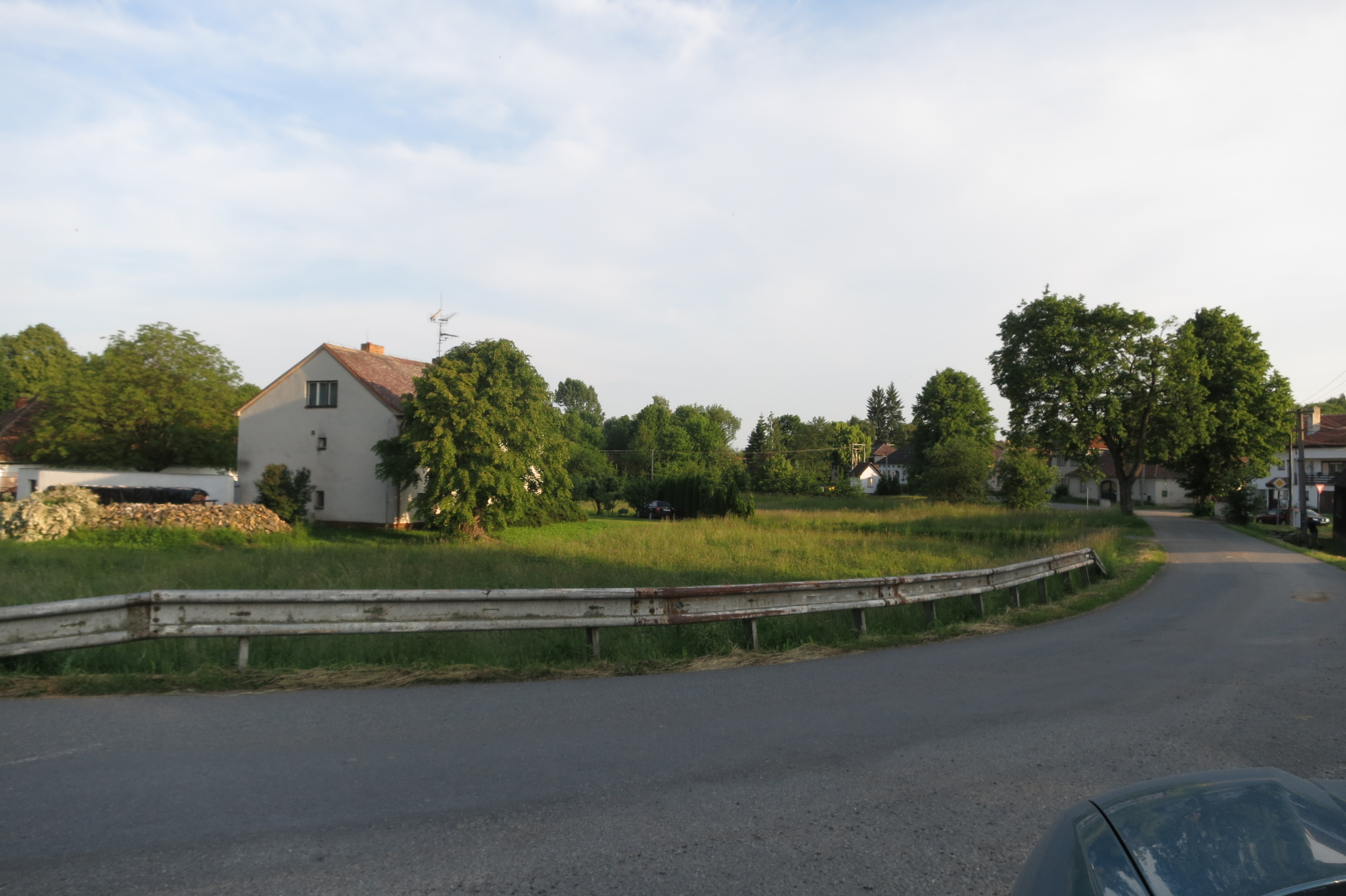
- Centre of Radotice

- Location in the Czech Republic
- Coordinates: 49°58′48″N 15°35′24″E
- Country: Czech Republic
- Region: Vysočina
- District: Třebíč
- First mentioned: 1369

Area
  - Total: 4.78 km^{2} (1.85 sq mi)
- Elevation: 424 m (1,391 ft)

Population (2026-01-01)
  - Total: 108
  - Density: 22.6/km^{2} (58.5/sq mi)
- Time zone: UTC+1 (CET)
  - Summer (DST): UTC+2 (CEST)
- Postal code: 675 32
- Website: www.obec-radotice.cz

Radotice is a municipality and village in Třebíč District in the Vysočina Region of the Czech Republic. It has about 100 inhabitants.

== Etymology ==
The name is derived from the personal name Radota, meaning "the village of Radota's people".

== Geography ==
Radotice is located about 33 kilometres (21 mi) southwest of Třebíč and 46 km (29 mi) south of Jihlava. It lies in the Jevišovice Uplands. The highest point is at 481 m (1,578 ft) above sea level. The Želetavka River flows through the municipality.

== History ==
The first written mention of Radotice is from 1369. Until 1667, the village often changed owners and belonged to various estates. From 1667, it was part of the Police estate.

== Demographics ==
Historical population

Year	Pop.	±%
1869	228	—
1880	227	−0.4%
1890	274	+20.7%
1900	283	+3.3%
1910	302	+6.7%

Year	Pop.	±%
1921	302	+0.0%
1930	295	−2.3%
1950	255	−13.6%
1961	248	−2.7%
1970	221	−10.9%

Year	Pop.	±%
1980	204	−7.7%
1991	173	−15.2%
2001	149	−13.9%
2011	135	−9.4%
2021	98	−27.4%

Source: Censuses

== Transport ==
There are no railways or major roads passing through the municipality.

== Sights ==
The main landmark of Radotice is the Chapel of the Holy Family. It is a late Neoclassical building with a narrow prismatic bell tower.
