= Svojkovice =

Svojkovice may refer to places in the Czech Republic:

- Svojkovice (Jihlava District), a municipality and village in the Vysočina Region
- Svojkovice (Rokycany District), a municipality and village in the Plzeň Region
