= Želetava =

- Market town
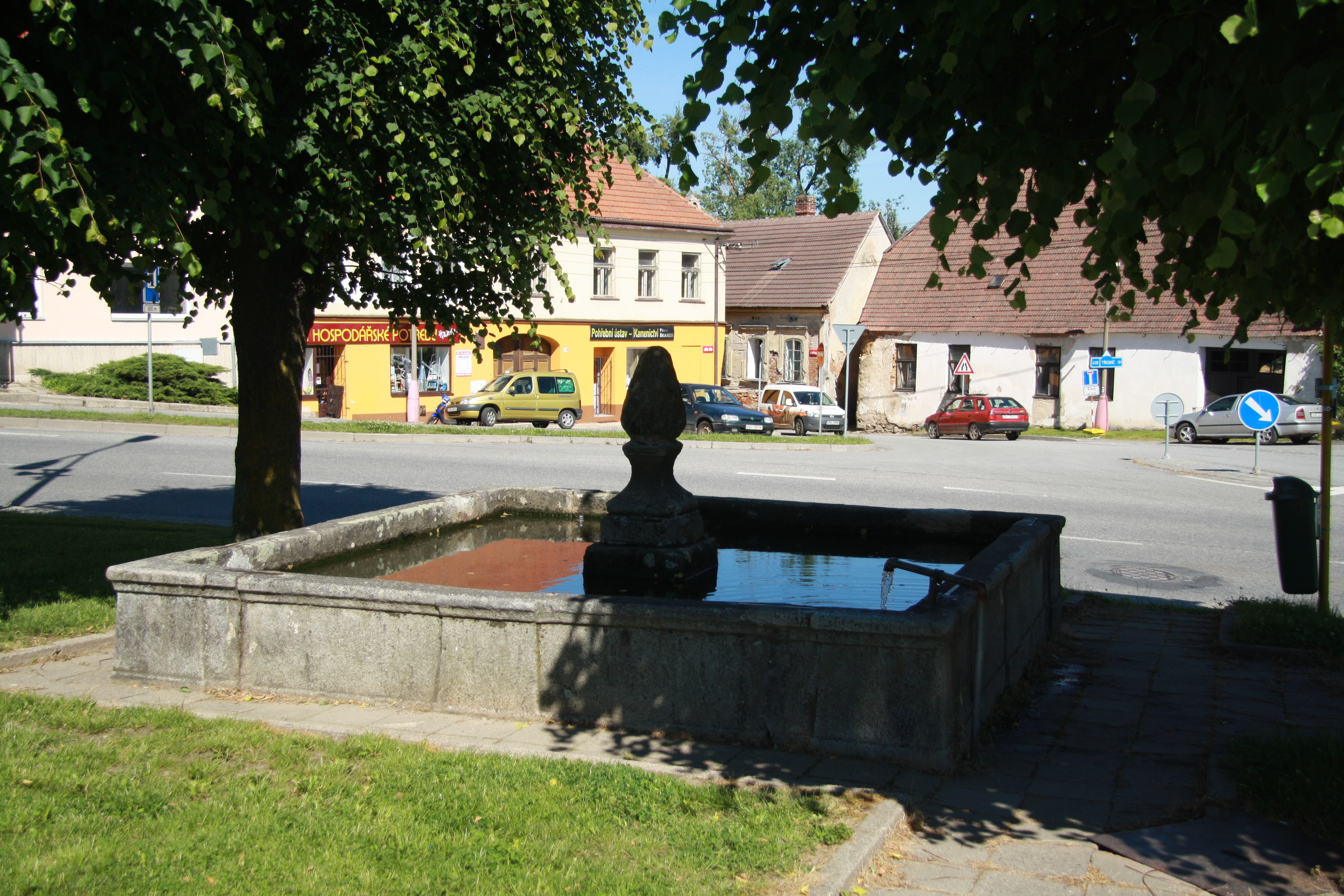
- Centre of Želetava

- Flag Coat of arms

- Location in the Czech Republic
- Coordinates: 49°8′30″N 15°40′22″E
- Country: Czech Republic
- Region: Vysočina
- District: Třebíč
- First mentioned: 1303

Area
  - Total: 27.59 km^{2} (10.65 sq mi)
- Elevation: 578 m (1,896 ft)

Population (2026-01-01)
  - Total: 1,476
  - Density: 53.50/km^{2} (138.6/sq mi)
- Time zone: UTC+1 (CET)
  - Summer (DST): UTC+2 (CEST)
- Postal code: 675 26
- Website: www.mestyszeletava.cz

Želetava (Czech pronunciation: [ˈʒɛlɛtava]; German: Schelletau) is a market town in Třebíč District in the Vysočina Region of the Czech Republic. It has about 1,500 inhabitants.

== Administrative division ==
Želetava consists of four municipal parts (in brackets population according to the 2021 census):

- Želetava (952)
- Bítovánky (179)
- Horky (162)
- Šašovice (145)

== Geography ==
Želetava is located about 17 kilometres (11 mi) southwest of Třebíč and 29 km (18 mi) south of Jihlava. It lies in the Křižanov Highlands. The highest point is at 680 m (2,231 ft) above sea level. The Želetavka River originates here and flows through the municipal territory. There are several fishponds supplied by the Želetavka.

== History ==
The first written mention of Želetava is from 1303. In 1370, it was promoted to a market town.

== Demographics ==
Historical population

Year	Pop.	±%
1869	2,067	—
1880	2,166	+4.8%
1890	2,168	+0.1%
1900	2,170	+0.1%
1910	2,136	−1.6%

Year	Pop.	±%
1921	2,122	−0.7%
1930	2,066	−2.6%
1950	1,649	−20.2%
1961	1,723	+4.5%
1970	1,606	−6.8%

Year	Pop.	±%
1980	1,660	+3.4%
1991	1,545	−6.9%
2001	1,544	−0.1%
2011	1,496	−3.1%
2021	1,438	−3.9%

Source: Censuses

== Economy ==
Želetava is known for a cheese factory, which has been operating since 1902. Since 2000, the factory has been owned by Bel Group.

== Transport ==
The I/38 road (the section from Jihlava to Znojmo, part of the European route E65) runs through the market town.

== Sights ==
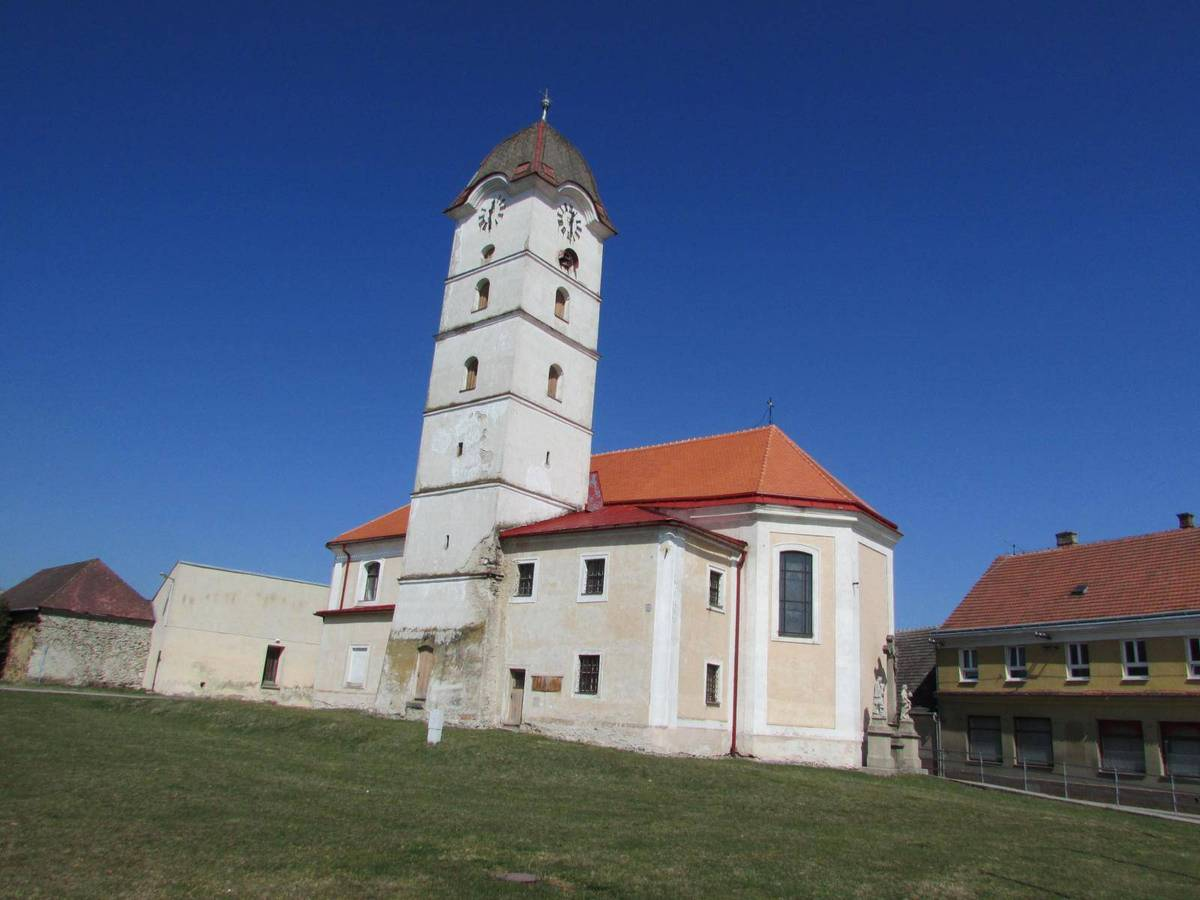
Church of Saint Michael the Archangel

The main landmark of Želetava is the Church of Saint Michael the Archangel with a tall prismatic tower. It has a Gothic core with Baroque modifications. In front of the church are two valuable statues of Saints John the Baptist and John of Nepomuk.

Other sights include the Chapel of Saint Catherine in Želetava and the Chapel of Saint Anthony of Padua in Horky.
