= Jemnice =

- Town
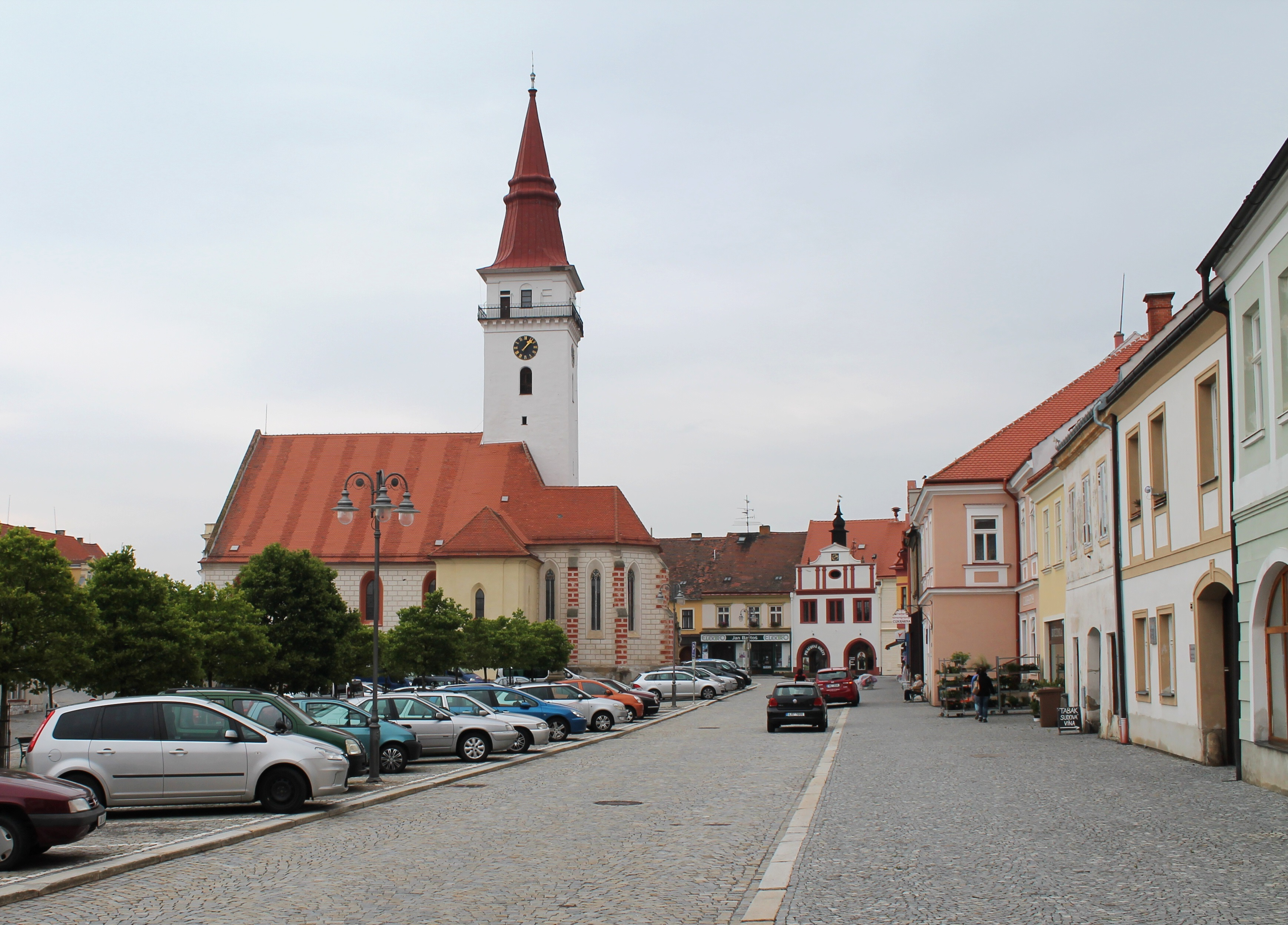
- Town square with the Church of Saint Stanislaus

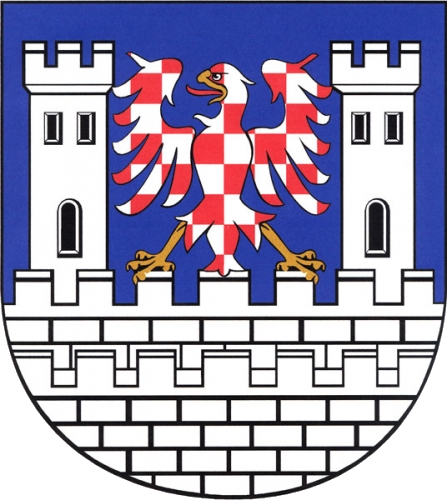
- Flag Coat of arms

- Location in the Czech Republic
- Coordinates: 49°1′9″N 15°34′12″E
- Country: Czech Republic
- Region: Vysočina
- District: Třebíč
- First mentioned: 1227

Government
  - Mayor: Miloň Slabý

Area
  - Total: 32.49 km^{2} (12.54 sq mi)
- Elevation: 470 m (1,540 ft)

Population (2026-01-01)
  - Total: 3,979
  - Density: 122.5/km^{2} (317.2/sq mi)
- Time zone: UTC+1 (CET)
  - Summer (DST): UTC+2 (CEST)
- Postal code: 675 31
- Website: www.mesto-jemnice.cz

Jemnice (Czech pronunciation: [ˈjɛmɲɪtsɛ]; German: Jamnitz) is a town in Třebíč District in the Vysočina Region of the Czech Republic. It has about 4,000 inhabitants. The town proper is located on the Želetavka River in the Jevišovice Uplands.

Jemnice was founded in the first quarter of the 13th century on the site of a mining settlement. The historic town centre is well preserved and is protected as an urban monument zone.

== Administrative division ==
Jemnice consists of three municipal parts (in brackets population according to the 2021 census):

- Jemnice (3,751)
- Louka (76)
- Panenská (81)

Panenská forms an exclave of the municipal territory.

== Etymology ==
The name is derived from jámy (i.e. 'pits') and jamník, which is an Old Czech word for 'miner'. It is connected with the mining history of the place.

== Geography ==
Jemnice is located about 31 kilometres (19 mi) southwest of Třebíč and 42 km (26 mi) south of Jihlava. It lies mostly in the Jevišovice Uplands. The hilly forested part in the north of the municipal territory belongs to the Křižanov Highlands and includes the highest point of Jemnice, the hill Inženýrský kopec at 602 m (1,975 ft) above sea level. The Želetavka River flows through the town. There are several fishponds in the municipal territory.

== History ==
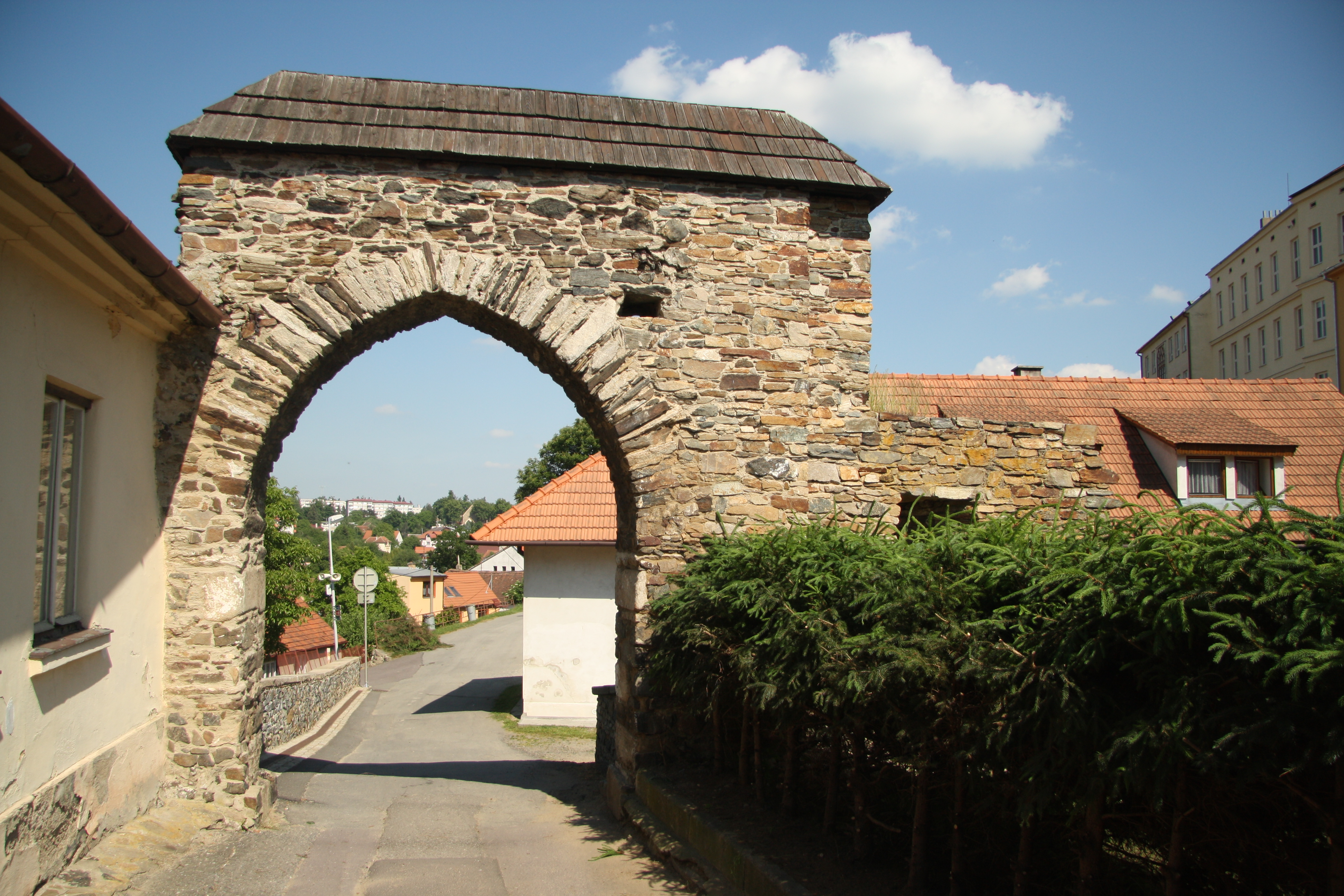
Fragment of the town fortifications

The predecessor of Jemnice is Podolí, which was founded in the 11th century as a mining settlement. A new town on a high promontory above the river Želetavka was founded before 1226. The first written mention of Jemnice is in a deed of King Ottokar I of Bohemia from 1227. It was a royal town until 1530. Town fortifications were mentioned in 1327. Jemnice resisted during minor wars, however it was conquered and burned down by army of Matthias Corvinus in 1468.

The mining in the vicinity of the town continued until the war times in the 15th century. After that, it was never successfully renewed and the main source of livelihood was agriculture and fish farming.

== Demographics ==
Historical population

Year	Pop.	±%
1869	2,812	—
1880	3,136	+11.5%
1890	3,025	−3.5%
1900	3,325	+9.9%
1910	3,484	+4.8%

Year	Pop.	±%
1921	3,486	+0.1%
1930	3,637	+4.3%
1950	3,522	−3.2%
1961	3,852	+9.4%
1970	3,802	−1.3%

Year	Pop.	±%
1980	4,011	+5.5%
1991	4,282	+6.8%
2001	4,307	+0.6%
2011	4,293	−0.3%
2021	3,908	−9.0%

Source: Censuses

== Transport ==
Jemnice is the terminus and start of a short local railway line from/to Moravské Budějovice.

== Sights ==
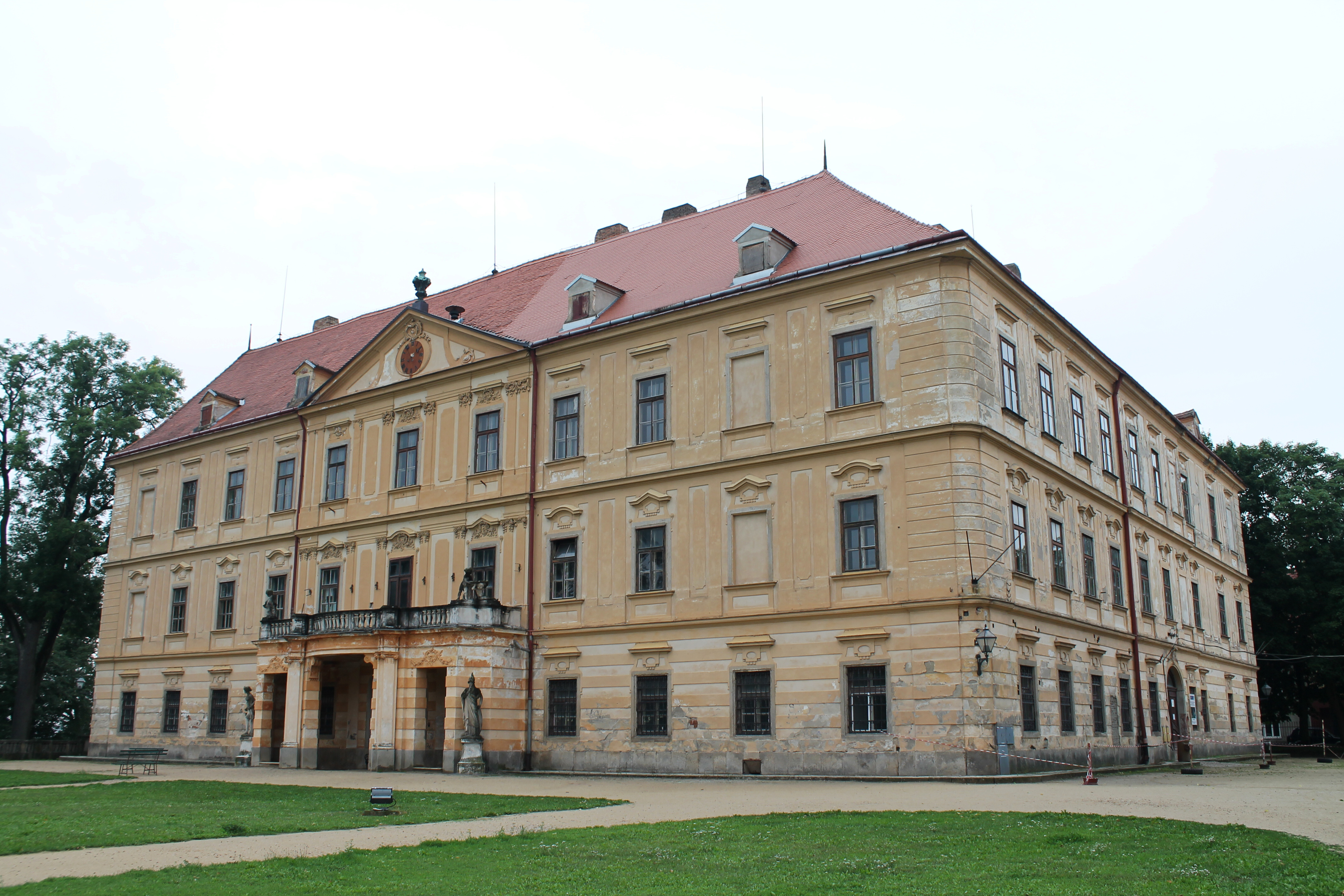
Jemnice Castle

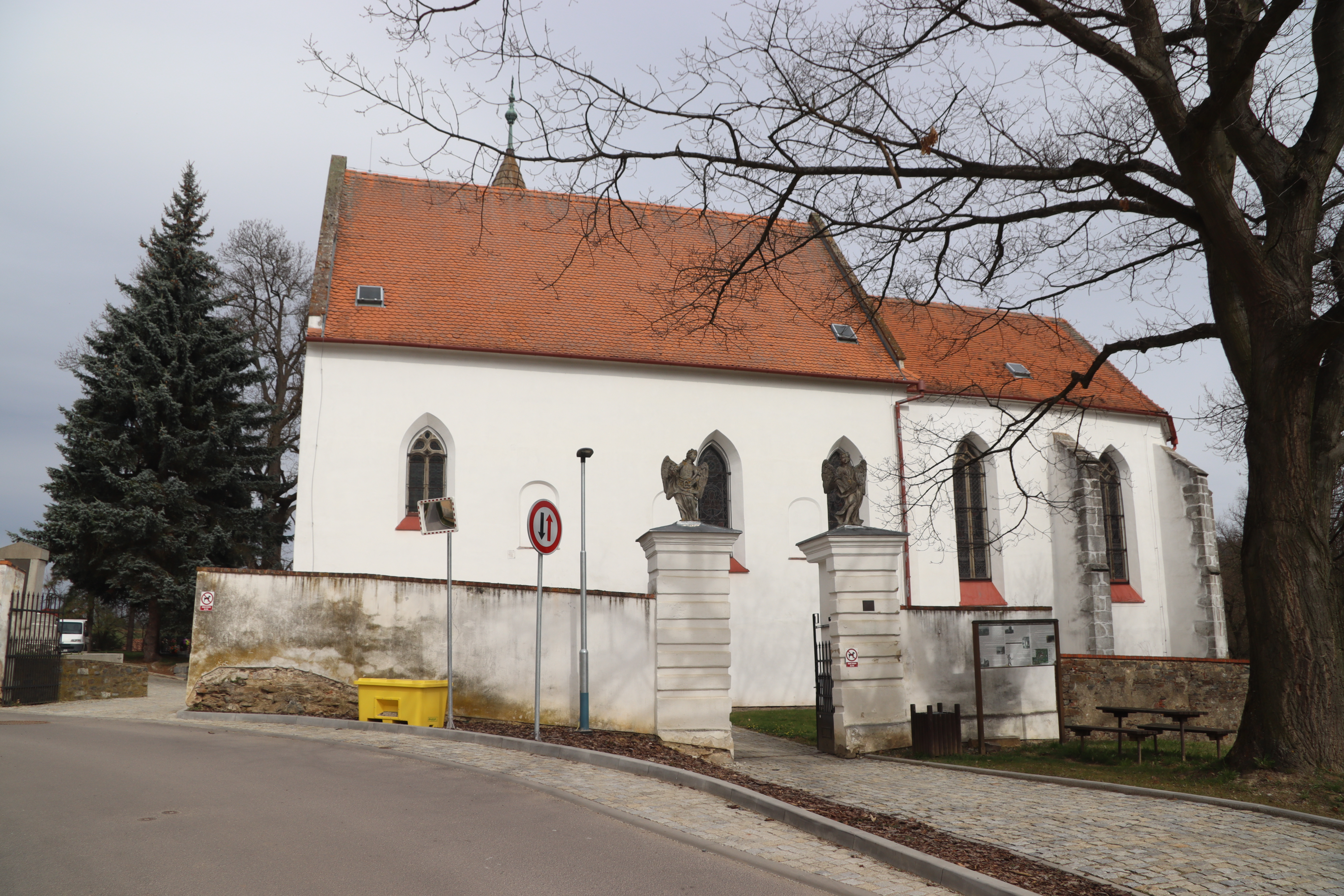
Church of Saint James the Great

Most of the preserved houses in the historic centre have a Gothic or Renaissance core. About 1,340 m (4,400 ft) of town walls and three bastions have been preserved to this day.

The original Gothic castle from the 13th century was rebuilt into a Renaissance residence in the 16th century. After 1734, Baroque reconstruction was made, and interiors were renovated in the Empire style after 1818. The last major reconstruction took place in the second half of the 19th century and stables, a brewery and administrative buildings were added. Since 1994, the castle has been in possession of the town and is open to the public.

There are three churches in the town. The main landmark of the town square is the Church of Saint Stanislaus. It was founded in the 14th century and rebuilt in the Renaissance style in the 1580s. In the oldest part of the town is the Church of Saint James the Great, which stands on the site of a Romanesque rotunda from the 11th or 12th century. Its late Gothic chancel was built in 1515.

The third church is the Church of Saint Vitus. This late Gothic church was built as a part of a Franciscan monastery, which was founded in 1455. After its abolition in the late 17th century, the monastery fell into disrepair and gradually disappeared. Only the underground spaces have been preserved.

== Notable people ==
- Hugo Charlemont (1850–1939), Austrian painter
- Roman Havelka (1877–1950), painter
- Karel Werner (1925–2019), indologist, orientalist and philosopher of religion

== Twin towns – sister cities ==
Jemnice is twinned with:

- Raabs an der Thaya, Austria
- Reszel, Poland
