= Veverské Knínice =

- Municipality
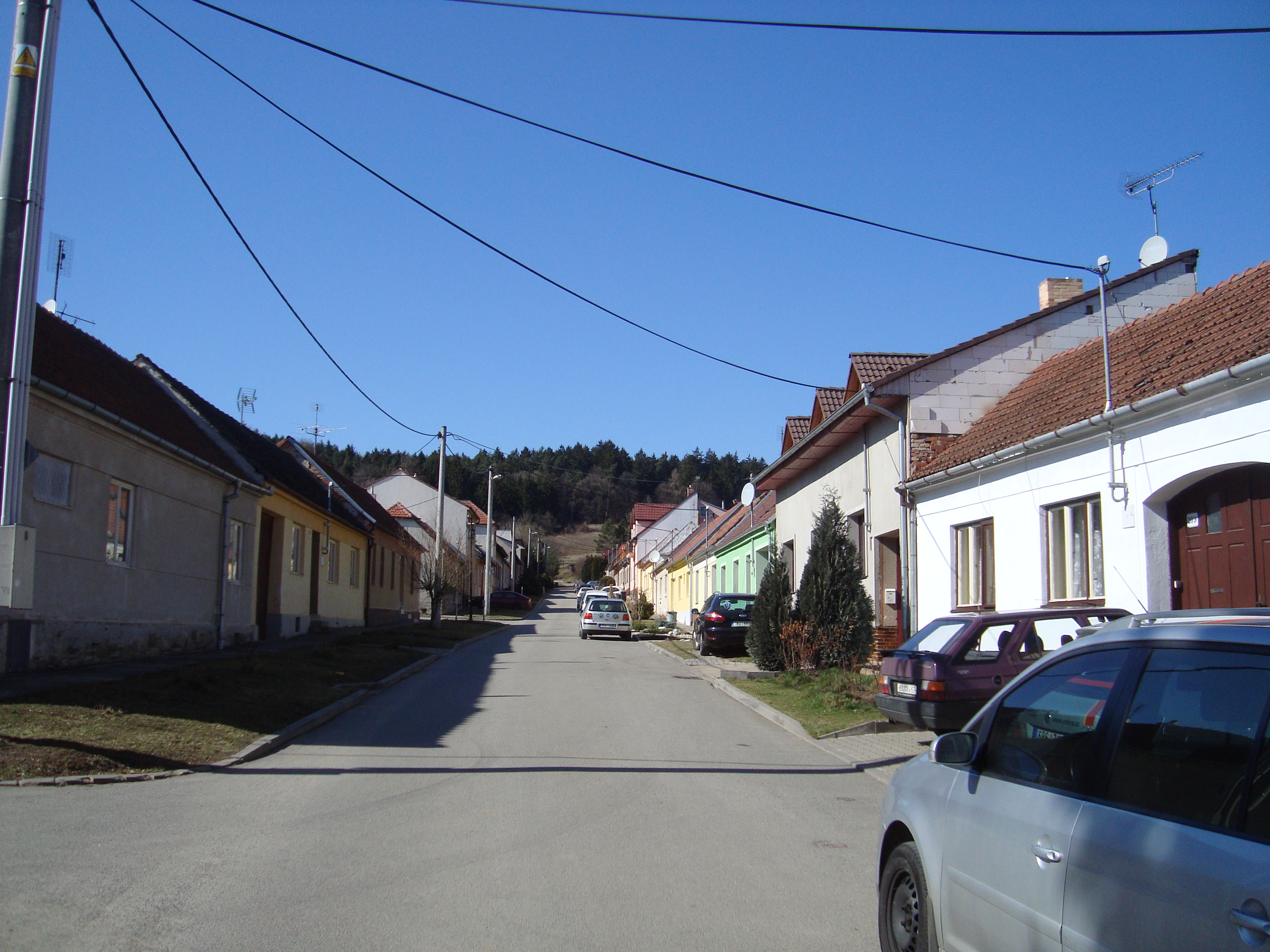
- Upper end

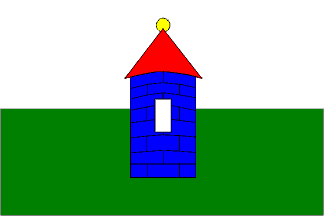
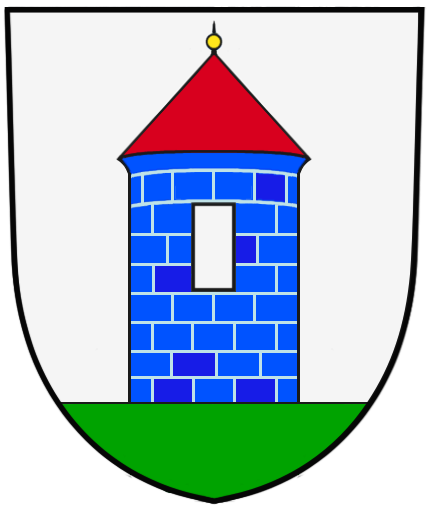
- Flag Coat of arms

- Location in the Czech Republic
- Coordinates: 49°14′13″N 16°24′7″E
- Country: Czech Republic
- Region: South Moravian
- District: Brno-Country
- First mentioned: 1233

Area
  - Total: 10.18 km^{2} (3.93 sq mi)
- Elevation: 334 m (1,096 ft)

Population (2026-01-01)
  - Total: 975
  - Density: 95.8/km^{2} (248/sq mi)
- Time zone: UTC+1 (CET)
  - Summer (DST): UTC+2 (CEST)
- Postal code: 664 81
- Website: www.veverskekninice.cz

Veverské Knínice is a municipality and village in Brno-Country District in the South Moravian Region of the Czech Republic. It has about 1,000 inhabitants.

Veverské Knínice lies approximately 17 kilometres (11 mi) west of Brno and 172 km (107 mi) south-east of Prague.

== Demographics ==
Historical population
Year	Pop.	±%
1869	733	—
1880	844	+15.1%
1890	833	−1.3%
1900	862	+3.5%
1910	947	+9.9%
1921	968	+2.2%
1930	1,030	+6.4%
1950	900	−12.6%
1961	939	+4.3%
1970	895	−4.7%
1980	847	−5.4%
1991	827	−2.4%
2001	813	−1.7%
2011	912	+12.2%
2021	956	+4.8%
Source: Censuses
