= Dešov =

- Municipality
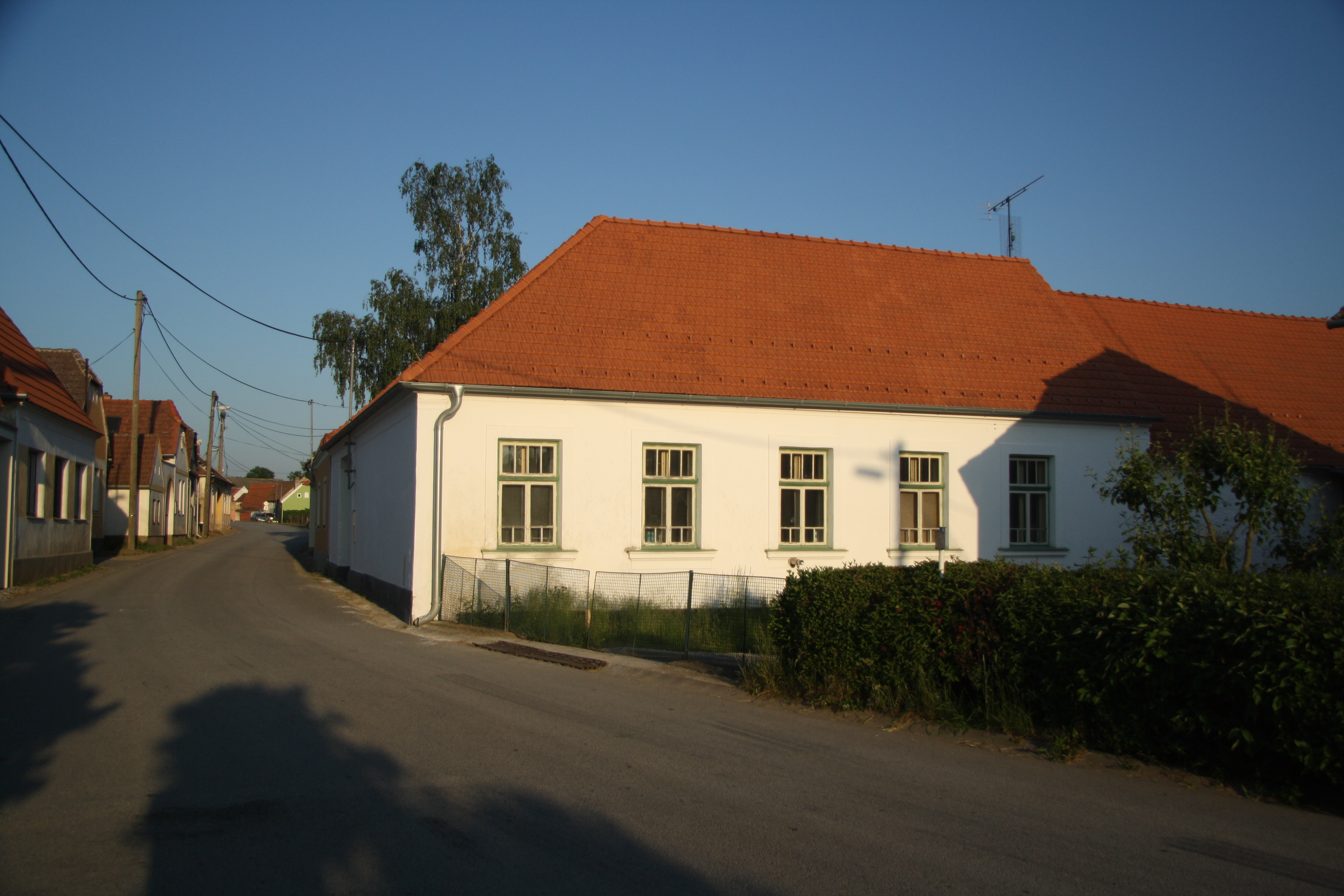
- Main street

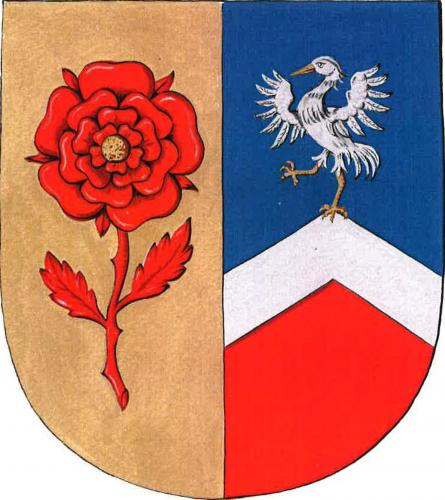
- Flag Coat of arms

- Location in the Czech Republic
- Coordinates: 48°59′8″N 15°42′5″E
- Country: Czech Republic
- Region: Vysočina
- District: Třebíč
- First mentioned: 1345

Area
  - Total: 22.46 km^{2} (8.67 sq mi)
- Elevation: 464 m (1,522 ft)

Population (2026-01-01)
  - Total: 473
  - Density: 21.1/km^{2} (54.5/sq mi)
- Time zone: UTC+1 (CET)
  - Summer (DST): UTC+2 (CEST)
- Postal code: 675 33
- Website: www.desov.cz

Dešov is a municipality and village in Třebíč District in the Vysočina Region of the Czech Republic. It has about 500 inhabitants. The village is well preserved and is protected as a village monument reservation.

Dešov lies approximately 30 kilometres (19 mi) south-west of Třebíč, 47 km (29 mi) south of Jihlava, and 154 km (96 mi) south-east of Prague.

== History ==
The first written mention of Dešov is from 1345.

== Demographics ==
Historical population
Year	Pop.	±%
1869	720	—
1880	731	+1.5%
1890	736	+0.7%
1900	774	+5.2%
1910	785	+1.4%
1921	825	+5.1%
1930	803	−2.7%
1950	684	−14.8%
1961	675	−1.3%
1970	608	−9.9%
1980	529	−13.0%
1991	458	−13.4%
2001	432	−5.7%
2011	408	−5.6%
2021	407	−0.2%
Source: Censuses
