= Jindřichovice (Jihlava District) =

- Municipality
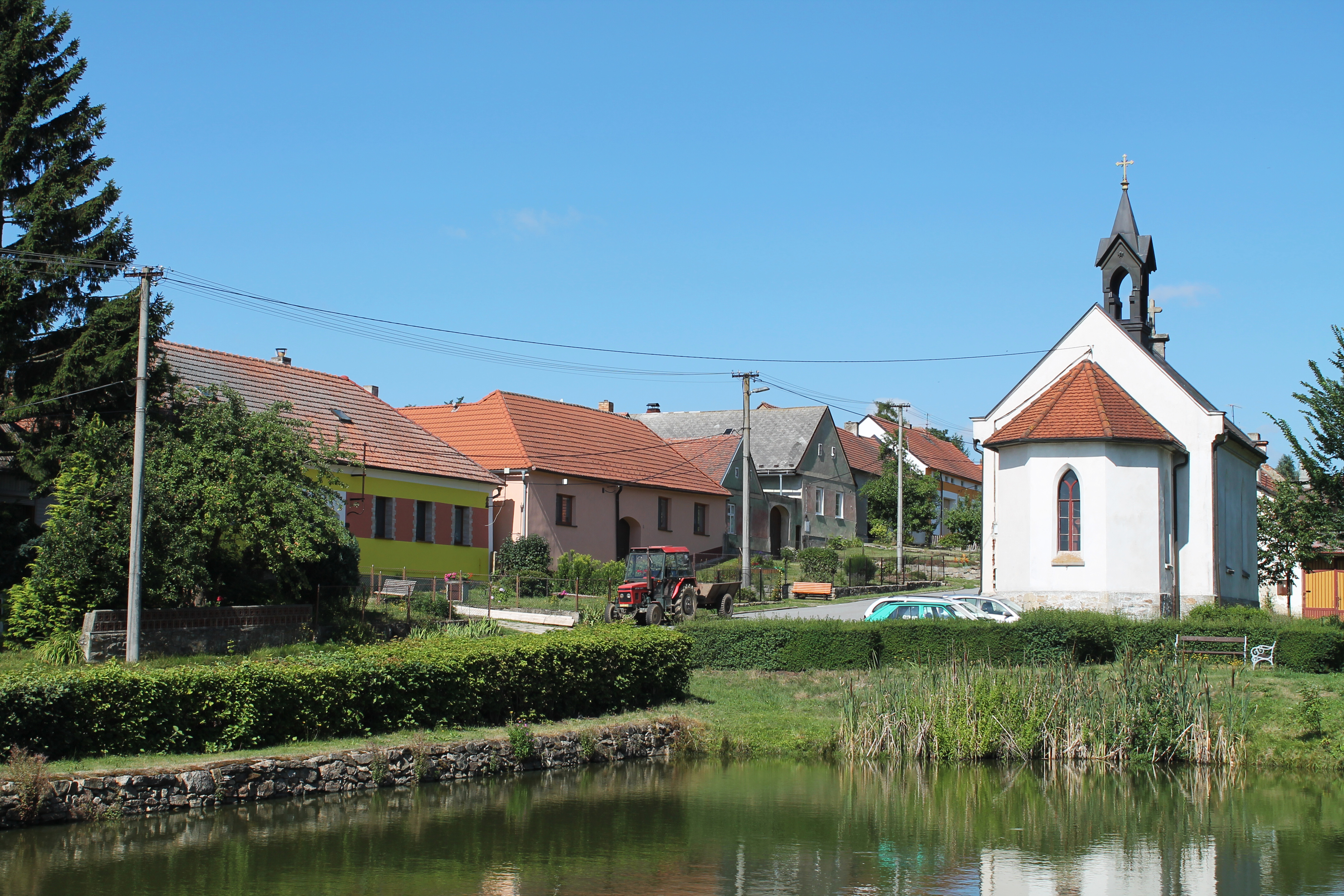
- Centre of Jindřichovice

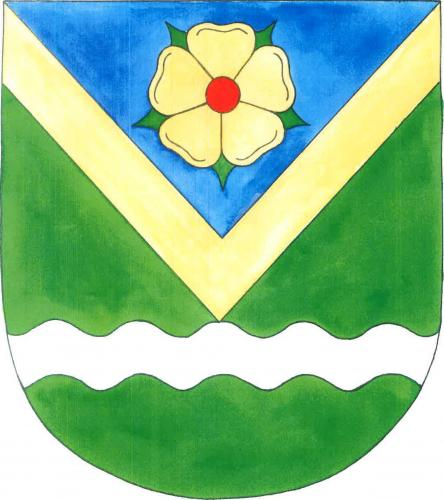
- Coat of arms

- Location in the Czech Republic
- Coordinates: 49°8′16″N 15°38′19″E
- Country: Czech Republic
- Region: Vysočina
- District: Jihlava
- First mentioned: 1354

Area
  - Total: 3.77 km^{2} (1.46 sq mi)
- Elevation: 605 m (1,985 ft)

Population (2026-01-01)
  - Total: 87
  - Density: 23/km^{2} (60/sq mi)
- Time zone: UTC+1 (CET)
  - Summer (DST): UTC+2 (CEST)
- Postal codes: 675 26
- Website: www.obec-jindrichovice.cz

Jindřichovice (Czech pronunciation: [ˈjɪndr̝ɪxovɪtsɛ]) is a municipality and village in Jihlava District in the Vysočina Region of the Czech Republic. It has about 90 inhabitants.

Jindřichovice lies approximately 30 kilometres (19 mi) south of Jihlava and 138 km (86 mi) south-east of Prague.

== Demographics ==
Historical population
Year	Pop.	±%
1869	207	—
1880	224	+8.2%
1890	206	−8.0%
1900	193	−6.3%
1910	201	+4.1%
1921	192	−4.5%
1930	182	−5.2%
1950	148	−18.7%
1961	148	+0.0%
1970	133	−10.1%
1980	106	−20.3%
1991	98	−7.5%
2001	99	+1.0%
2011	84	−15.2%
2021	88	+4.8%
Source: Censuses
