= Dešná (Jindřichův Hradec District) =

- Municipality
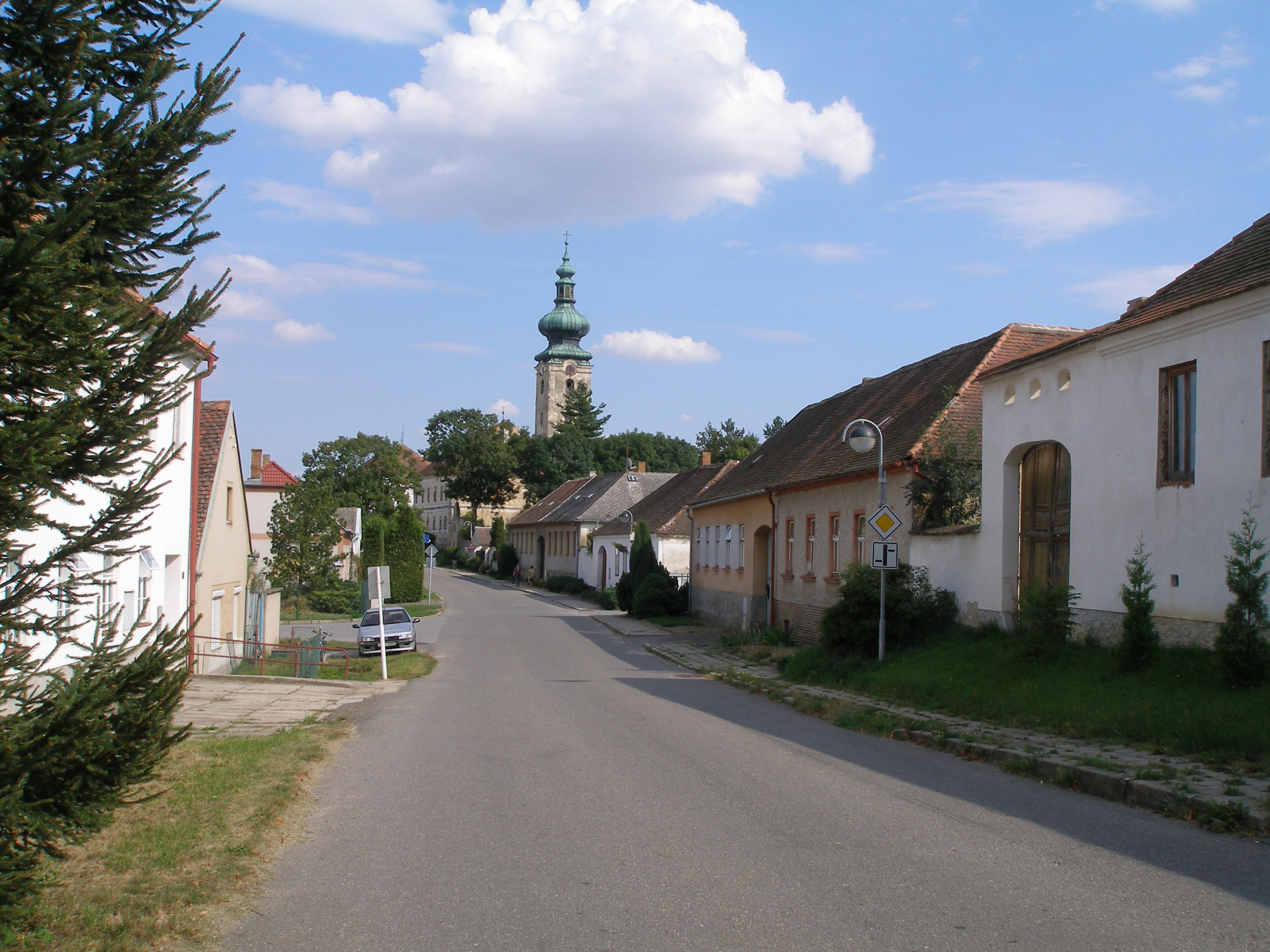
- Main street

- Flag Coat of arms

- Location in the Czech Republic
- Coordinates: 48°57′27″N 15°32′34″E
- Country: Czech Republic
- Region: South Bohemian
- District: Jindřichův Hradec
- First mentioned: 1300

Area
  - Total: 37.74 km^{2} (14.57 sq mi)
- Elevation: 466 m (1,529 ft)

Population (2026-01-01)
  - Total: 592
  - Density: 15.7/km^{2} (40.6/sq mi)
- Time zone: UTC+1 (CET)
  - Summer (DST): UTC+2 (CEST)
- Postal codes: 378 73, 378 81
- Website: www.desna.cz

Dešná (German: Döschen) is a municipality and village in Jindřichův Hradec District in the South Bohemian Region of the Czech Republic. It has about 600 inhabitants.

== Administrative division ==
Dešná consists of seven municipal parts (in brackets population according to the 2021 census):

- Dešná (269)
- Bělčovice (42)
- Chvalkovice (50)
- Dančovice (47)
- Hluboká (28)
- Plačovice (29)
- Rancířov (111)

== Demographics ==
Historical population
Year	Pop.	±%
1869	1,423	—
1880	1,453	+2.1%
1890	1,423	−2.1%
1900	1,393	−2.1%
1910	1,381	−0.9%
1921	1,557	+12.7%
1930	1,529	−1.8%
1950	1,140	−25.4%
1961	1,193	+4.6%
1970	1,075	−9.9%
1980	894	−16.8%
1991	716	−19.9%
2001	705	−1.5%
2011	613	−13.0%
2021	576	−6.0%
Source: Censuses
