= Zblovice =

- Municipality
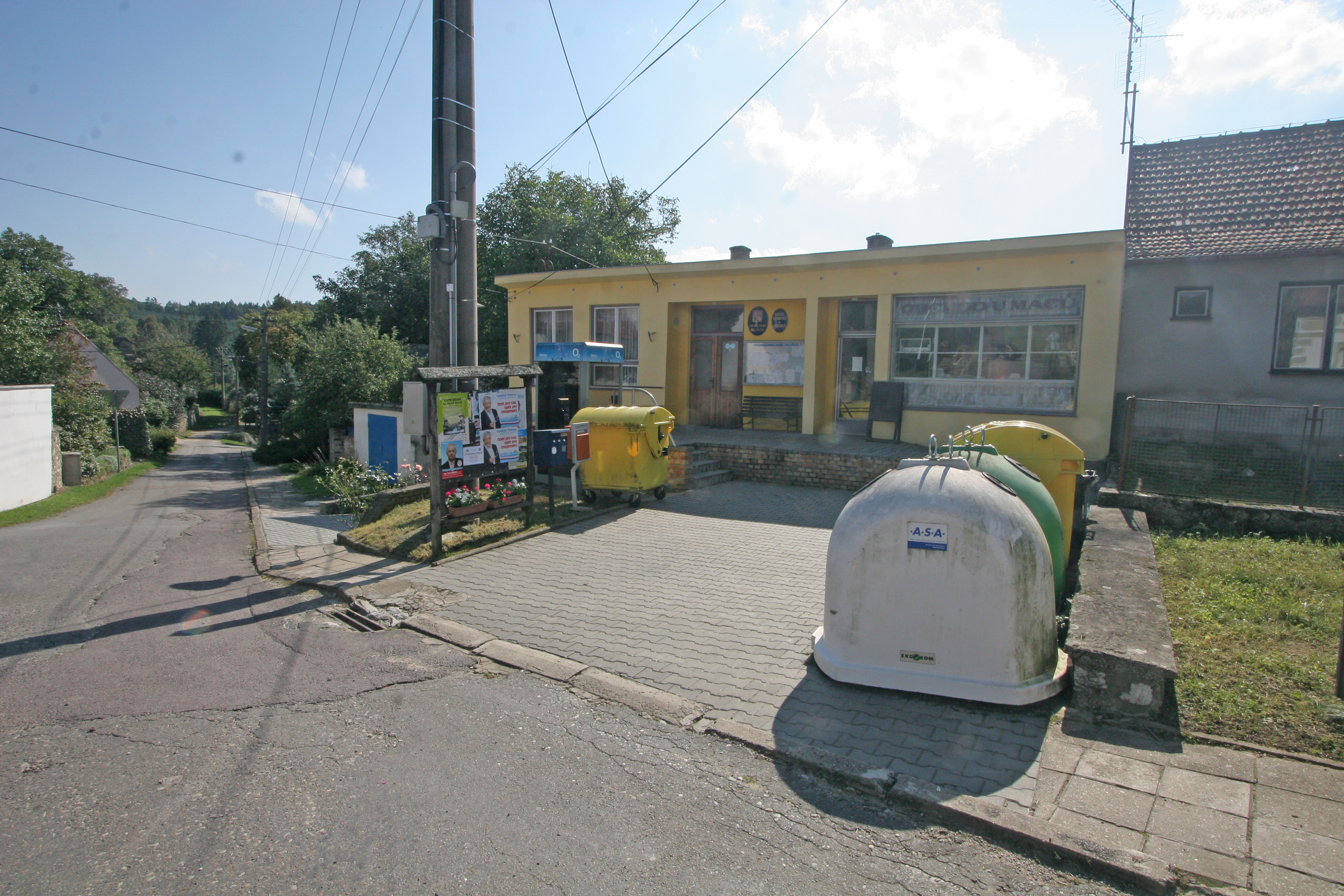
- Municipal office in the centre of Zblovice

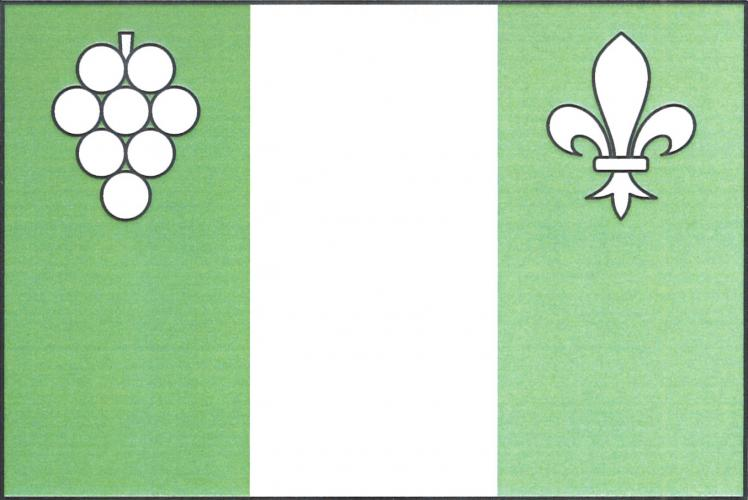
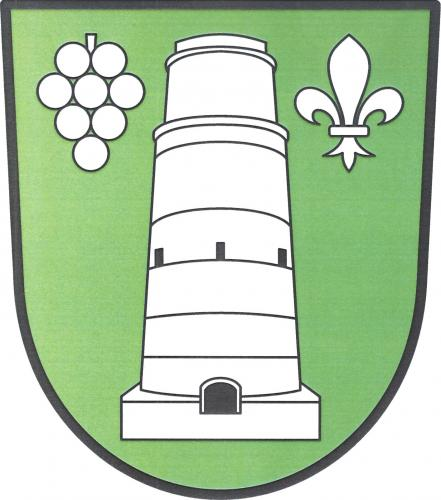
- Flag Coat of arms

- Location in the Czech Republic
- Coordinates: 48°57′28″N 15°42′19″E
- Country: Czech Republic
- Region: South Moravian
- District: Znojmo
- First mentioned: 1349

Area
  - Total: 4.49 km^{2} (1.73 sq mi)
- Elevation: 438 m (1,437 ft)

Population (2026-01-01)
  - Total: 38
  - Density: 8.5/km^{2} (22/sq mi)
- Time zone: UTC+1 (CET)
  - Summer (DST): UTC+2 (CEST)
- Postal code: 671 07
- Website: www.obeczblovice.cz

Zblovice is a municipality and village in Znojmo District in the South Moravian Region of the Czech Republic. It has about 40 inhabitants.

Zblovice lies approximately 27 kilometres (17 mi) north-west of Znojmo, 72 km (45 mi) west of Brno, and 157 km (98 mi) south-east of Prague.

== Demographics ==
Historical population
Year	Pop.	±%
1869	166	—
1880	169	+1.8%
1890	187	+10.7%
1900	162	−13.4%
1910	154	−4.9%
1921	175	+13.6%
1930	183	+4.6%
1950	116	−36.6%
1961	120	+3.4%
1970	108	−10.0%
1980	90	−16.7%
1991	71	−21.1%
2001	54	−23.9%
2011	37	−31.5%
2021	35	−5.4%
Source: Censuses
