= Budeč (Jindřichův Hradec District) =

- Municipality
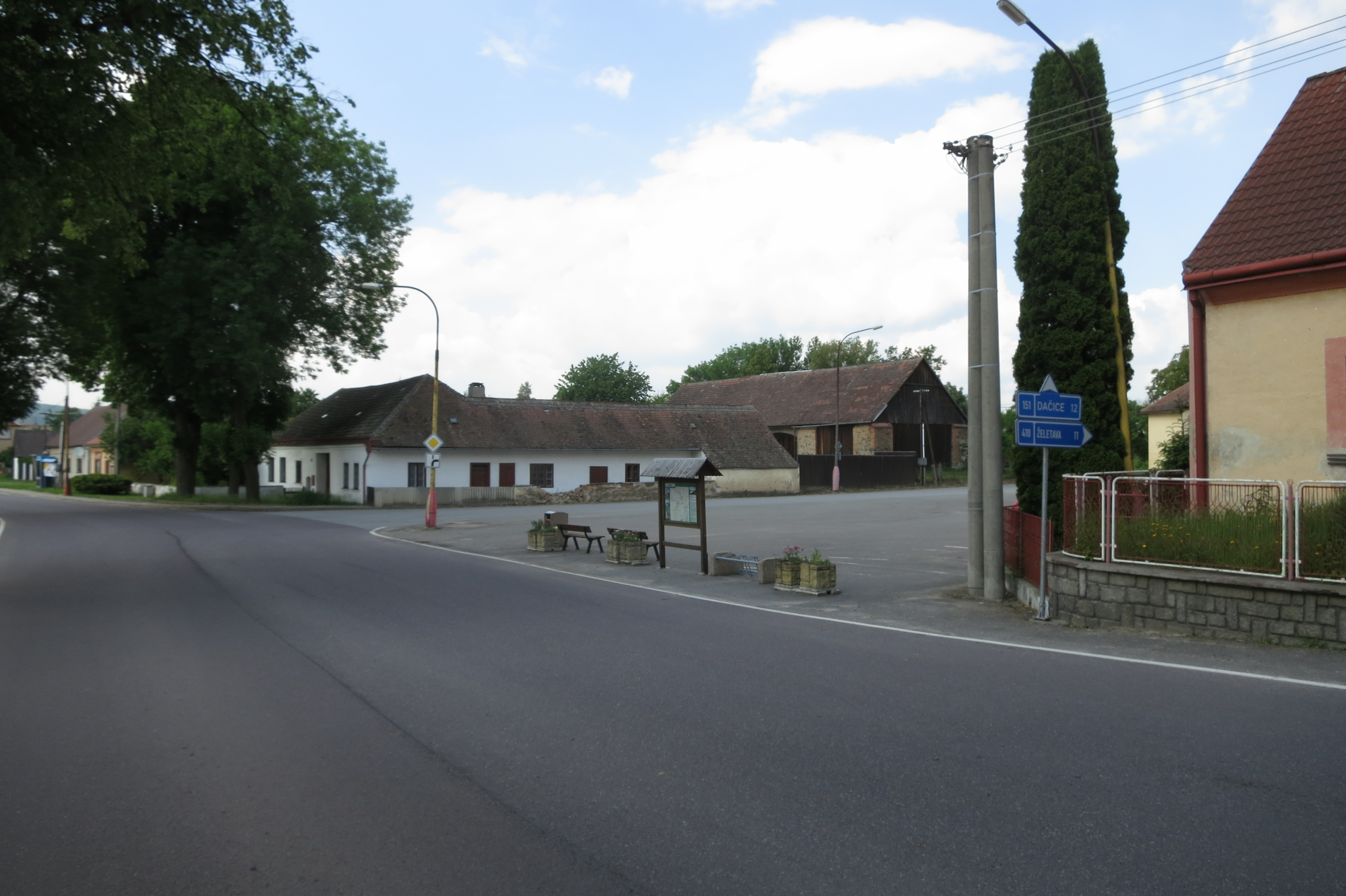
- Centre of Budeč

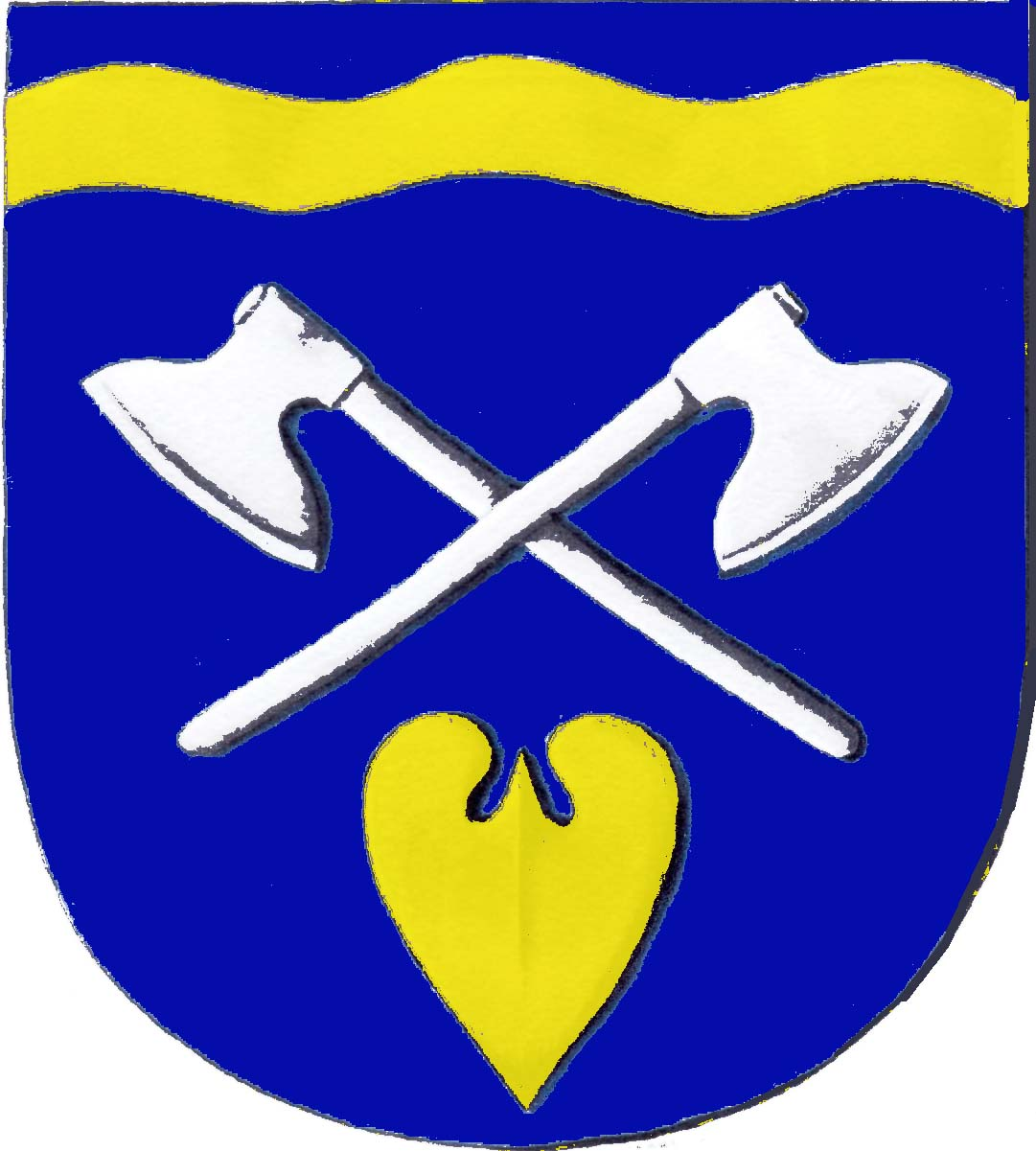
- Flag Coat of arms

- Location in the Czech Republic
- Coordinates: 49°5′14″N 15°35′24″E
- Country: Czech Republic
- Region: South Bohemian
- District: Jindřichův Hradec
- First mentioned: 1251

Area
  - Total: 5.08 km^{2} (1.96 sq mi)
- Elevation: 488 m (1,601 ft)

Population (2026-01-01)
  - Total: 218
  - Density: 42.9/km^{2} (111/sq mi)
- Time zone: UTC+1 (CET)
  - Summer (DST): UTC+2 (CEST)
- Postal codes: 378 92, 380 01
- Website: www.obecbudec.cz

Budeč (German: Butsch) is a municipality and village in Jindřichův Hradec District in the South Bohemian Region of the Czech Republic. It has about 200 inhabitants.

== Administrative division ==
Budeč consists of two municipal parts (in brackets population according to the 2021 census):

- Budeč (185)
- Borová (23)

== Demographics ==
Historical population
Year	Pop.	±%
1869	482	—
1880	471	−2.3%
1890	484	+2.8%
1900	495	+2.3%
1910	438	−11.5%
1921	408	−6.8%
1930	399	−2.2%
1950	306	−23.3%
1961	334	+9.2%
1970	288	−13.8%
1980	255	−11.5%
1991	232	−9.0%
2001	231	−0.4%
2011	226	−2.2%
2021	208	−8.0%
Source: Censuses
