= Vysočany (Znojmo District) =

- Municipality
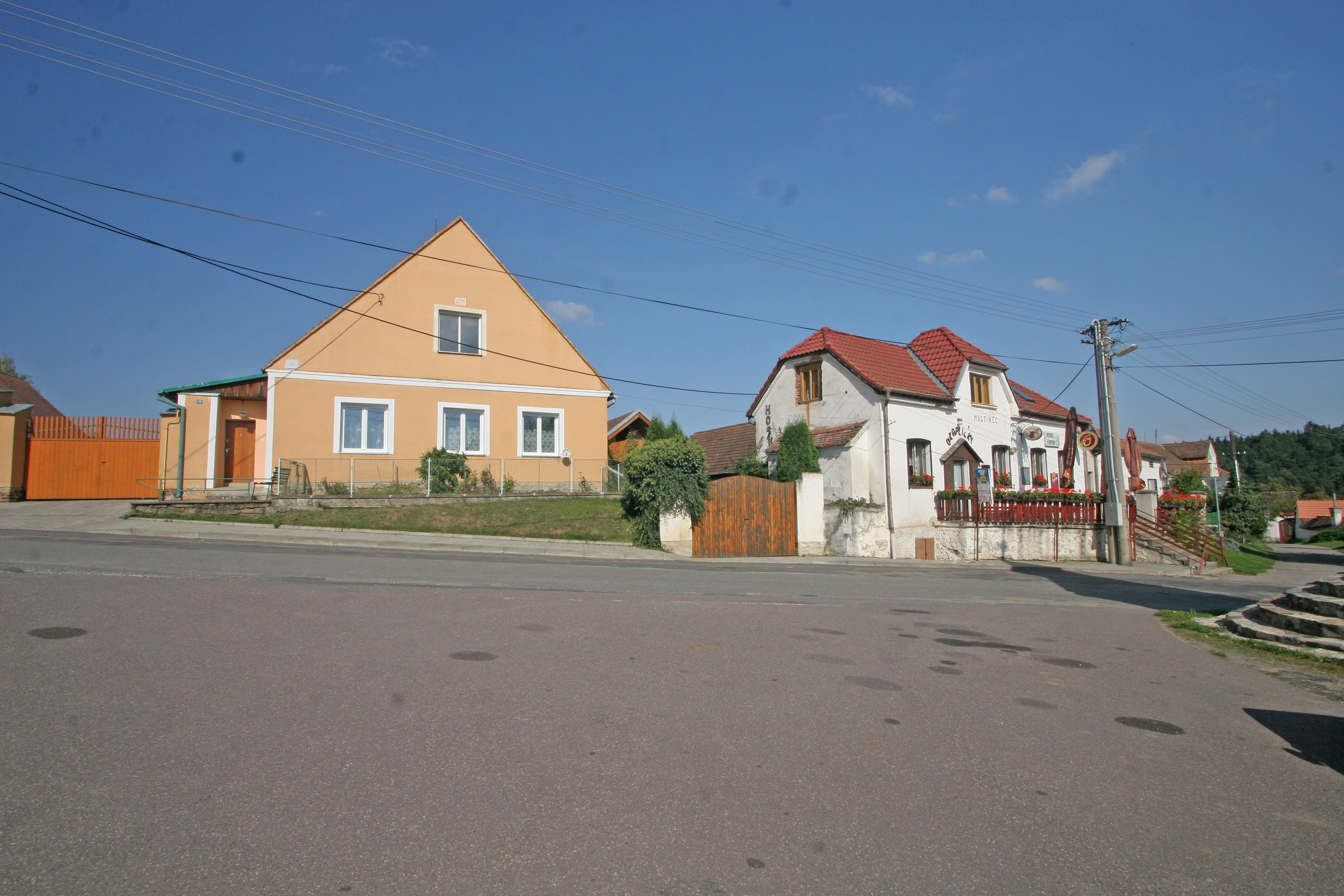
- Centre of Vysočany

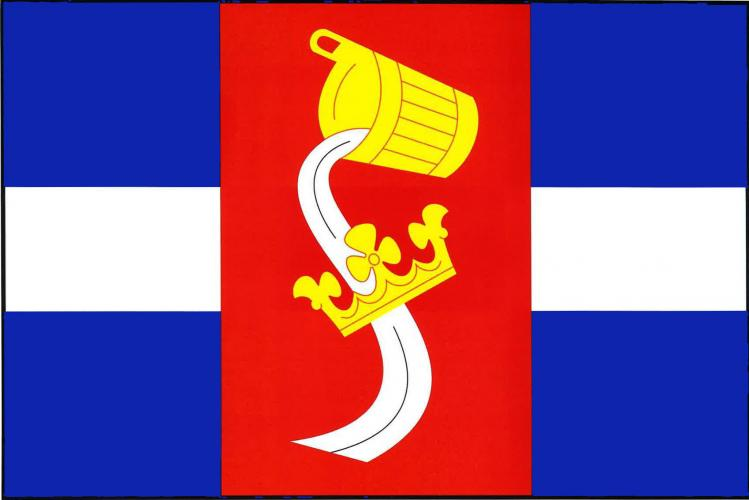
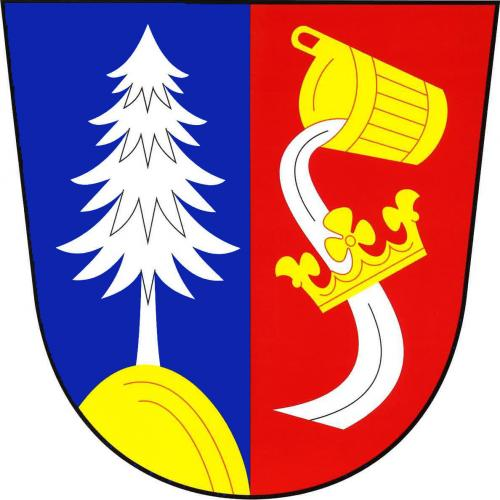
- Flag Coat of arms

- Location in the Czech Republic
- Coordinates: 48°56′28″N 15°41′23″E
- Country: Czech Republic
- Region: South Moravian
- District: Znojmo
- First mentioned: 1498

Area
  - Total: 7.26 km^{2} (2.80 sq mi)
- Elevation: 435 m (1,427 ft)

Population (2026-01-01)
  - Total: 88
  - Density: 12/km^{2} (31/sq mi)
- Time zone: UTC+1 (CET)
  - Summer (DST): UTC+2 (CEST)
- Postal code: 671 07
- Website: www.obec-vysocany.cz

Vysočany is a municipality and village in Znojmo District in the South Moravian Region of the Czech Republic. It has about 90 inhabitants.

Vysočany lies approximately 29 kilometres (18 mi) north-west of Znojmo, 74 km (46 mi) west of Brno, and 156 km (97 mi) south-east of Prague.

== Demographics ==
Historical population
Year	Pop.	±%
1869	226	—
1880	198	−12.4%
1890	217	+9.6%
1900	246	+13.4%
1910	222	−9.8%
1921	238	+7.2%
1930	293	+23.1%
1950	211	−28.0%
1961	192	−9.0%
1970	187	−2.6%
1980	159	−15.0%
1991	140	−11.9%
2001	118	−15.7%
2011	117	−0.8%
2021	94	−19.7%
Source: Censuses
