= Chotěbudice =

- Municipality
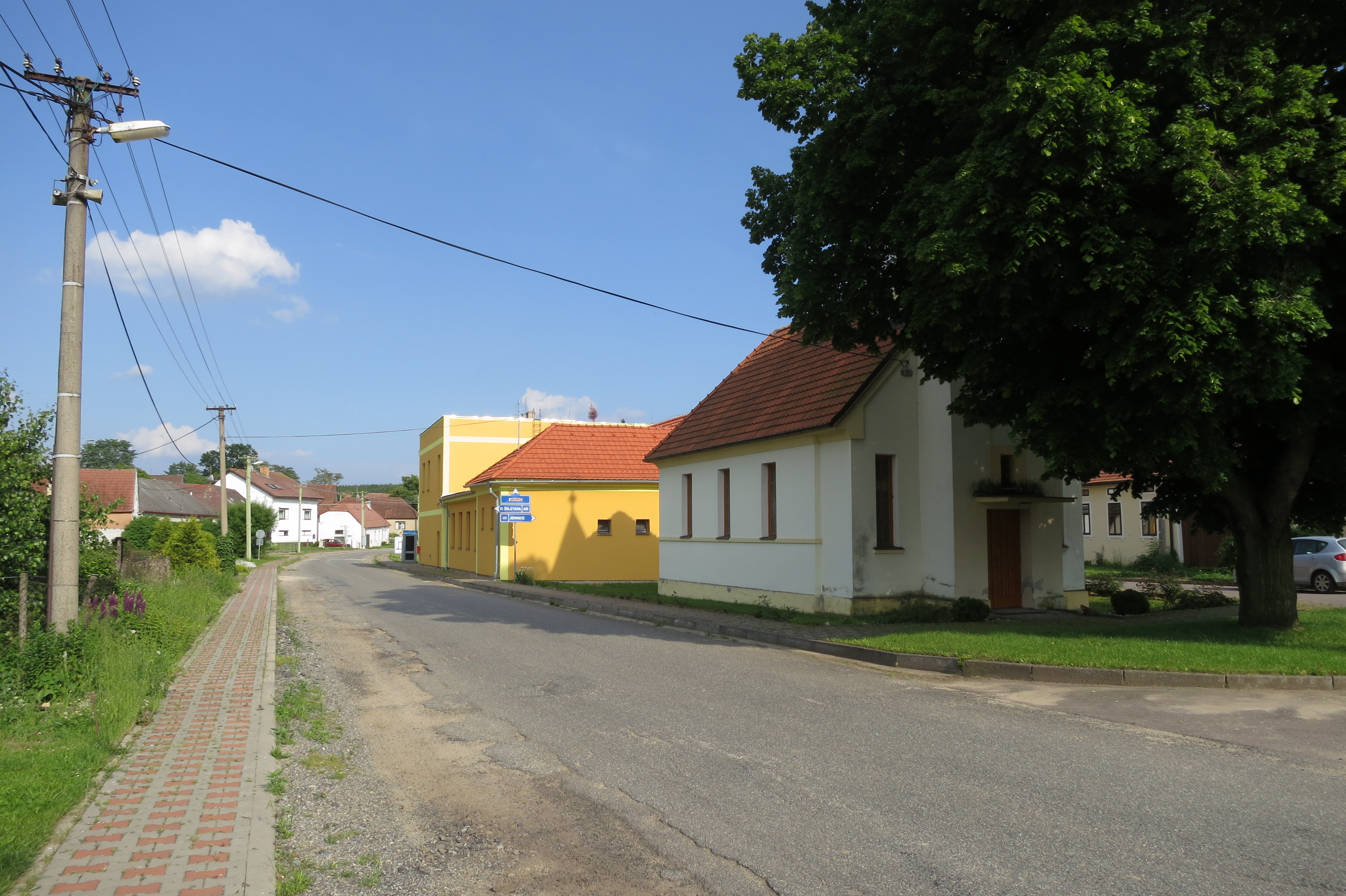
- Centre of Chotěbudice

- Location in the Czech Republic
- Coordinates: 49°3′29″N 15°34′26″E
- Country: Czech Republic
- Region: Vysočina
- District: Třebíč
- First mentioned: 1351

Area
  - Total: 5.51 km^{2} (2.13 sq mi)
- Elevation: 480 m (1,570 ft)

Population (2026-01-01)
  - Total: 106
  - Density: 19.2/km^{2} (49.8/sq mi)
- Time zone: UTC+1 (CET)
  - Summer (DST): UTC+2 (CEST)
- Postal code: 675 31
- Website: www.chotebudice.cz

Chotěbudice (German: Dreieichen) is a municipality and village in Třebíč District in the Vysočina Region of the Czech Republic. It has about 100 inhabitants.

Chotěbudice lies approximately 29 kilometres (18 mi) south-west of Třebíč, 38 km (24 mi) south of Jihlava, and 142 km (88 mi) south-east of Prague.

== Demographics ==
Historical population
Year	Pop.	±%
1869	298	—
1880	298	+0.0%
1890	282	−5.4%
1900	295	+4.6%
1910	316	+7.1%
1921	299	−5.4%
1930	270	−9.7%
1950	227	−15.9%
1961	177	−22.0%
1970	167	−5.6%
1980	145	−13.2%
1991	114	−21.4%
2001	112	−1.8%
2011	100	−10.7%
2021	101	+1.0%
Source: Censuses
