= Bačkovice =

- Municipality
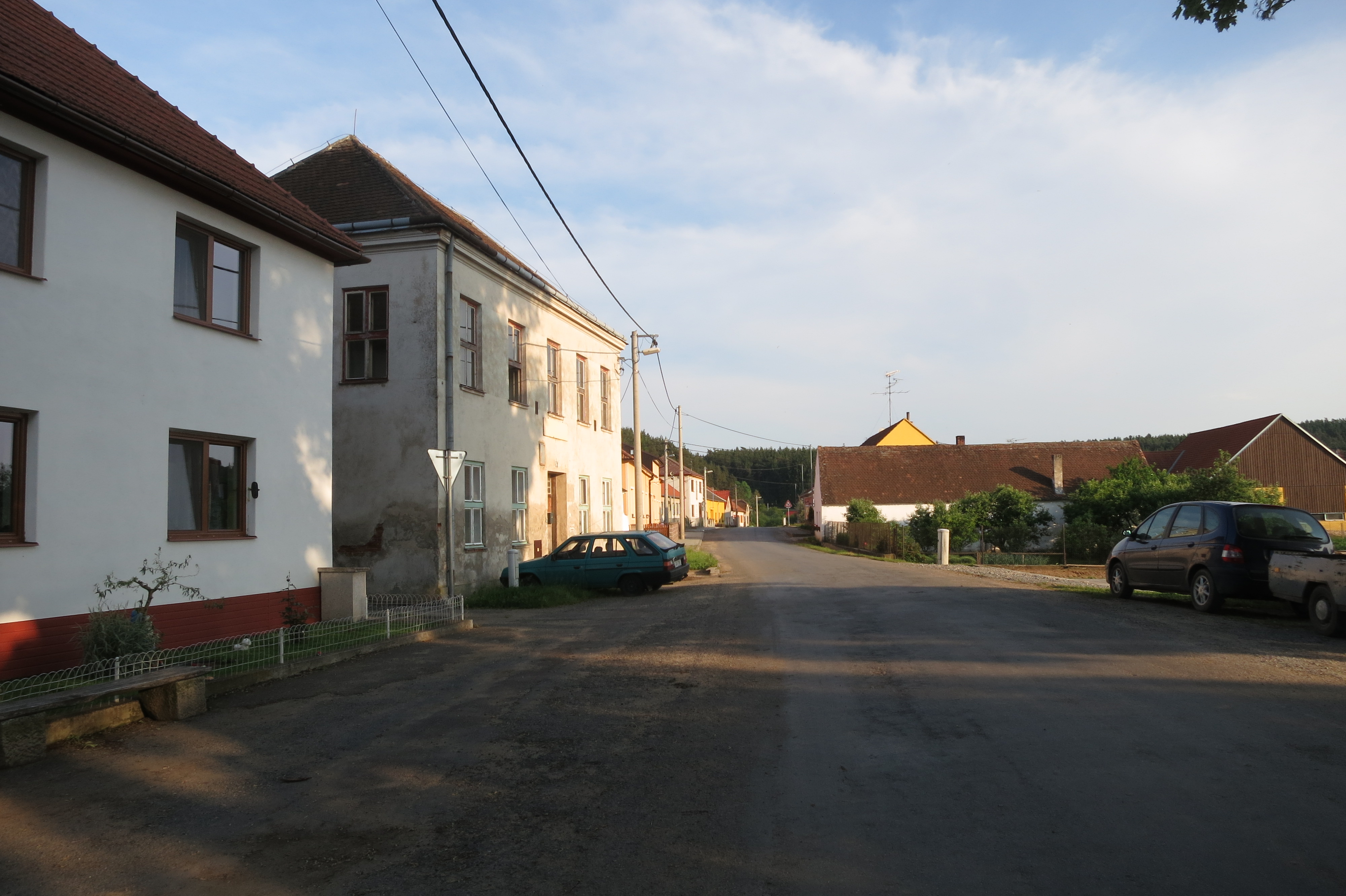
- Centre of Bačkovice

- Location in the Czech Republic
- Coordinates: 48°58′3″N 15°35′21″E
- Country: Czech Republic
- Region: Vysočina
- District: Třebíč
- First mentioned: 1294

Area
  - Total: 6.39 km^{2} (2.47 sq mi)
- Elevation: 424 m (1,391 ft)

Population (2026-01-01)
  - Total: 85
  - Density: 13/km^{2} (34/sq mi)
- Time zone: UTC+1 (CET)
  - Summer (DST): UTC+2 (CEST)
- Postal code: 675 32
- Website: www.backovice.cz

Bačkovice is a municipality and village in Třebíč District in the Vysočina Region of the Czech Republic. It has about 90 inhabitants.

Bačkovice lies approximately 36 kilometres (22 mi) south-west of Třebíč, 48 km (30 mi) south of Jihlava, and 151 km (94 mi) south-east of Prague.

== Demographics ==
Historical population
Year	Pop.	±%
1869	259	—
1880	253	−2.3%
1890	262	+3.6%
1900	287	+9.5%
1910	295	+2.8%
1921	305	+3.4%
1930	288	−5.6%
1950	226	−21.5%
1961	217	−4.0%
1970	215	−0.9%
1980	190	−11.6%
1991	163	−14.2%
2001	139	−14.7%
2011	116	−16.5%
2021	93	−19.8%
Source: Censuses
