= Kostníky =

- Municipality
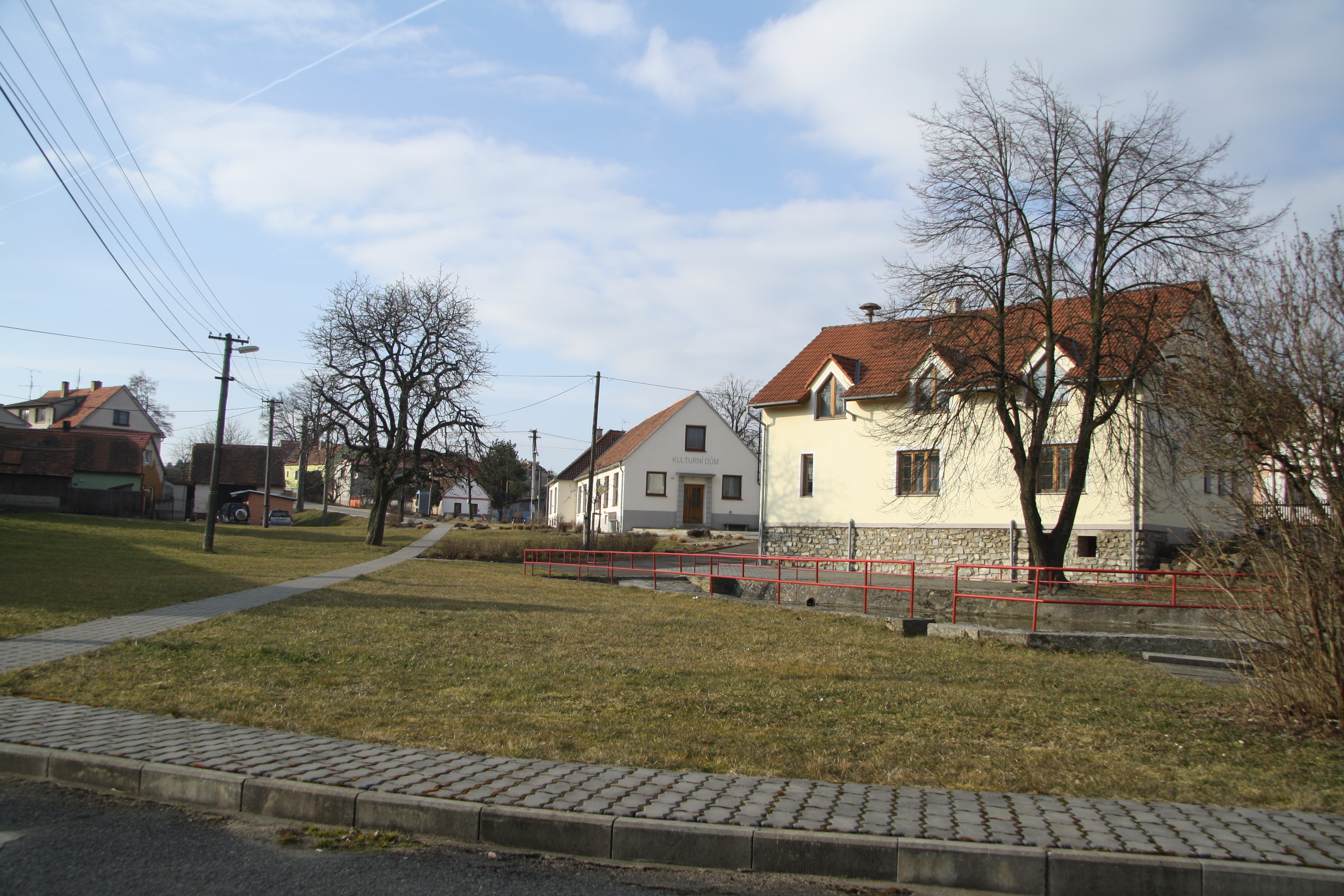
- Centre of Kostníky

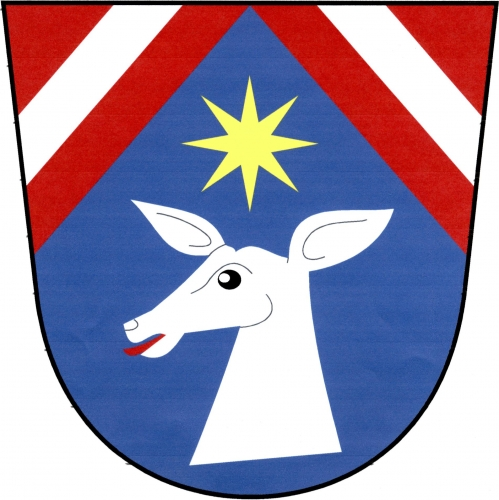
- Flag Coat of arms

- Location in the Czech Republic
- Coordinates: 48°58′29″N 15°38′23″E
- Country: Czech Republic
- Region: Vysočina
- District: Třebíč
- First mentioned: 1345

Area
  - Total: 12.92 km^{2} (4.99 sq mi)
- Elevation: 452 m (1,483 ft)

Population (2026-01-01)
  - Total: 190
  - Density: 15/km^{2} (38/sq mi)
- Time zone: UTC+1 (CET)
  - Summer (DST): UTC+2 (CEST)
- Postal code: 675 32
- Website: www.kostniky.cz

Kostníky is a municipality and village in Třebíč District in the Vysočina Region of the Czech Republic. It has about 200 inhabitants.

Kostníky lies approximately 33 kilometres (21 mi) south-west of Třebíč, 48 km (30 mi) south of Jihlava, and 152 km (94 mi) south-east of Prague.

== Demographics ==
Historical population
Year	Pop.	±%
1869	339	—
1880	335	−1.2%
1890	330	−1.5%
1900	367	+11.2%
1910	343	−6.5%
1921	351	+2.3%
1930	362	+3.1%
1950	264	−27.1%
1961	270	+2.3%
1970	276	+2.2%
1980	262	−5.1%
1991	215	−17.9%
2001	226	+5.1%
2011	186	−17.7%
2021	181	−2.7%
Source: Censuses
