= Krasonice =

- Municipality
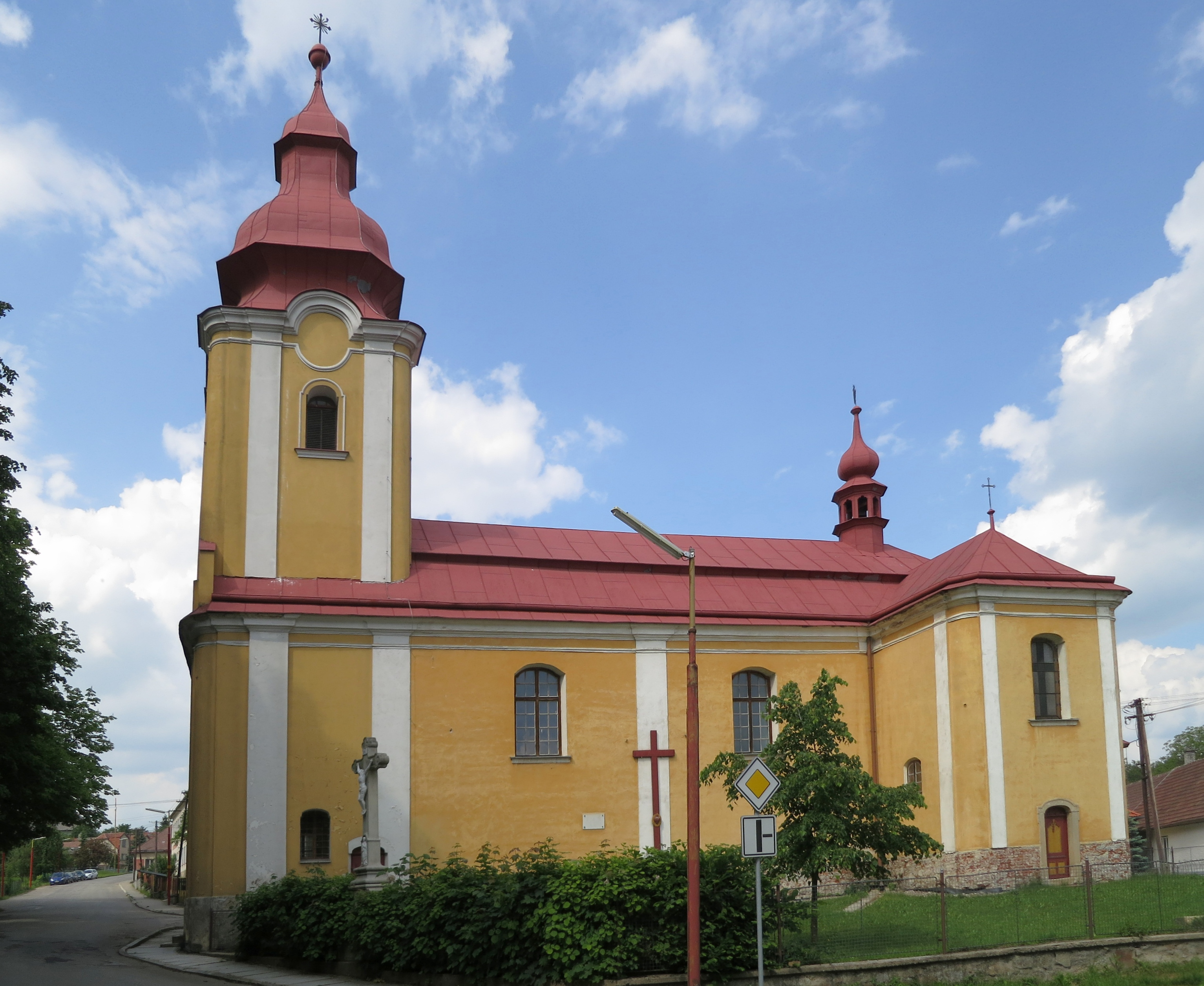
- Church of Saint Lawrence

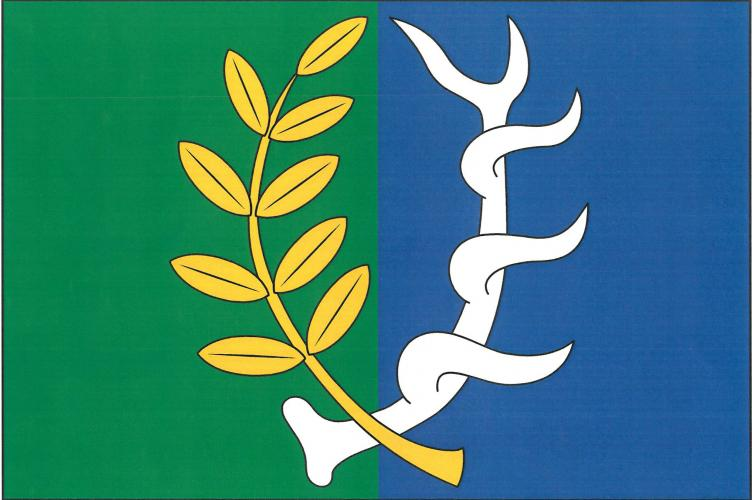
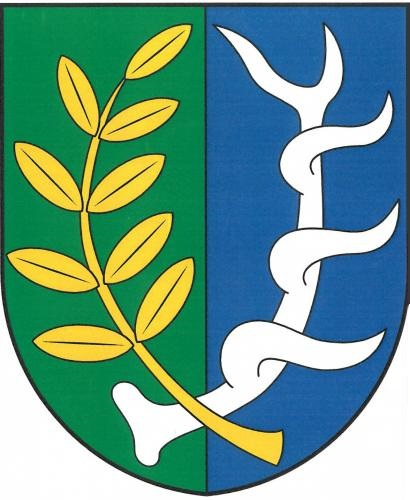
- Flag Coat of arms

- Location in the Czech Republic
- Coordinates: 49°6′54″N 15°36′58″E
- Country: Czech Republic
- Region: Vysočina
- District: Jihlava
- First mentioned: 1286

Area
  - Total: 11.81 km^{2} (4.56 sq mi)
- Elevation: 548 m (1,798 ft)

Population (2026-01-01)
  - Total: 222
  - Density: 18.8/km^{2} (48.7/sq mi)
- Time zone: UTC+1 (CET)
  - Summer (DST): UTC+2 (CEST)
- Postal code: 588 64
- Website: www.krasonice.cz

Krasonice (Czech pronunciation: [ˈkrasoɲɪtsɛ]) is a municipality and village in Jihlava District in the Vysočina Region of the Czech Republic. It has about 200 inhabitants.

Krasonice lies approximately 32 kilometres (20 mi) south of Jihlava and 138 km (86 mi) south-east of Prague.

== History ==
The first written mention of Krasonice is from 1286.

== Demographics ==
Historical population
Year	Pop.	±%
1869	674	—
1880	685	+1.6%
1890	663	−3.2%
1900	642	−3.2%
1910	667	+3.9%
1921	638	−4.3%
1930	640	+0.3%
1950	452	−29.4%
1961	414	−8.4%
1970	361	−12.8%
1980	311	−13.9%
1991	245	−21.2%
2001	237	−3.3%
2011	202	−14.8%
2021	197	−2.5%
Source: Censuses
