= Horní Meziříčko =

- Municipality
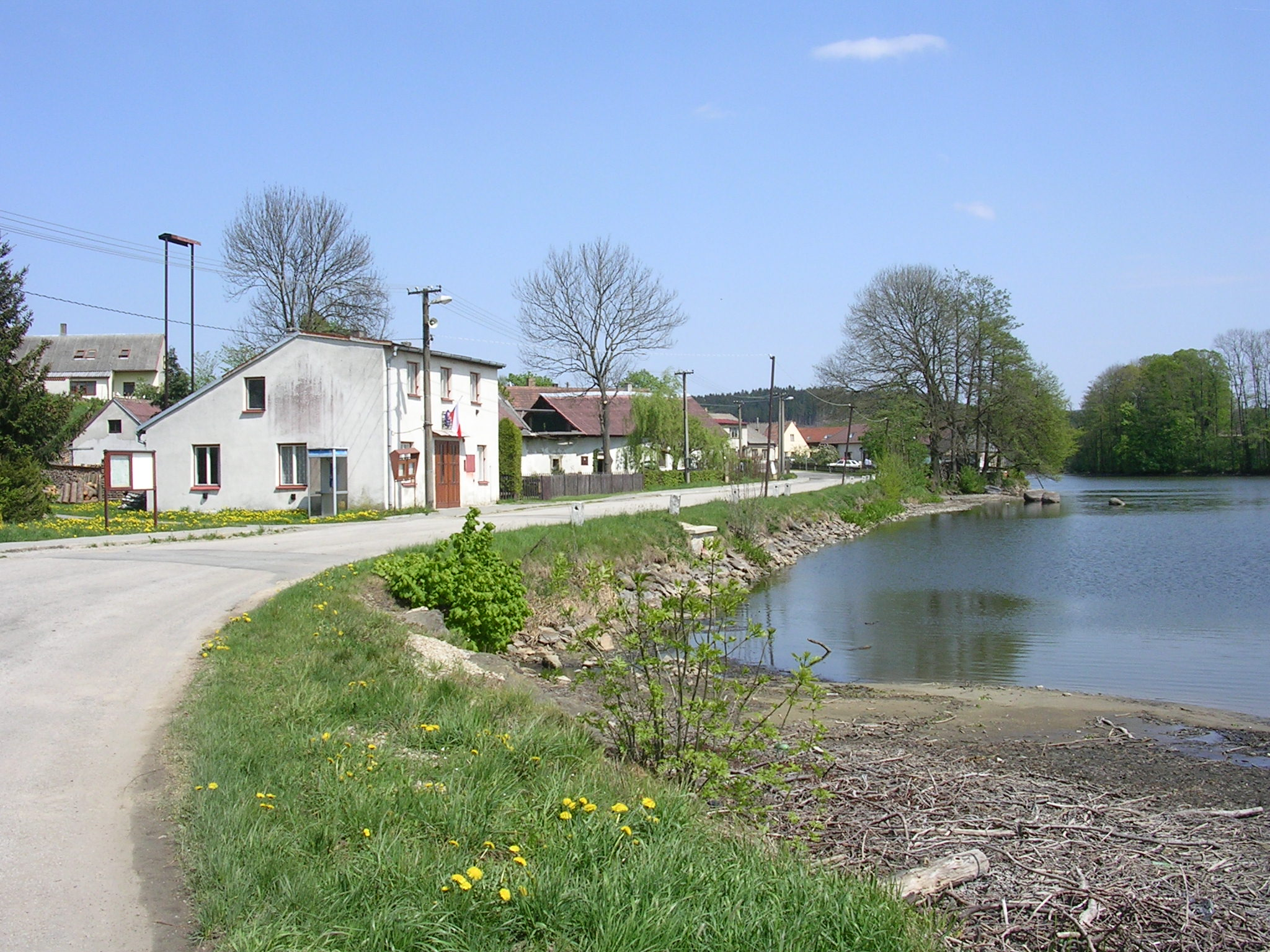
- Main street

- Flag Coat of arms

- Location in the Czech Republic
- Coordinates: 49°9′24″N 15°14′40″E
- Country: Czech Republic
- Region: South Bohemian
- District: Jindřichův Hradec
- First mentioned: 1361

Area
  - Total: 4.40 km^{2} (1.70 sq mi)
- Elevation: 555 m (1,821 ft)

Population (2026-01-01)
  - Total: 109
  - Density: 24.8/km^{2} (64.2/sq mi)
- Time zone: UTC+1 (CET)
  - Summer (DST): UTC+2 (CEST)
- Postal code: 378 53
- Website: hornimeziricko.cz

Horní Meziříčko is a municipality and village in Jindřichův Hradec District in the South Bohemian Region of the Czech Republic. It has about 100 inhabitants.

Horní Meziříčko lies approximately 18 kilometres (11 mi) east of Jindřichův Hradec, 61 km (38 mi) east of České Budějovice, and 119 km (74 mi) south-east of Prague.

== Demographics ==
Historical population
Year	Pop.	±%
1869	178	—
1880	173	−2.8%
1890	209	+20.8%
1900	210	+0.5%
1910	220	+4.8%
1921	210	−4.5%
1930	179	−14.8%
1950	165	−7.8%
1961	163	−1.2%
1970	142	−12.9%
1980	134	−5.6%
1991	138	+3.0%
2001	110	−20.3%
2011	101	−8.2%
2021	90	−10.9%
Source: Censuses
