= Radkovice u Budče =

- Municipality
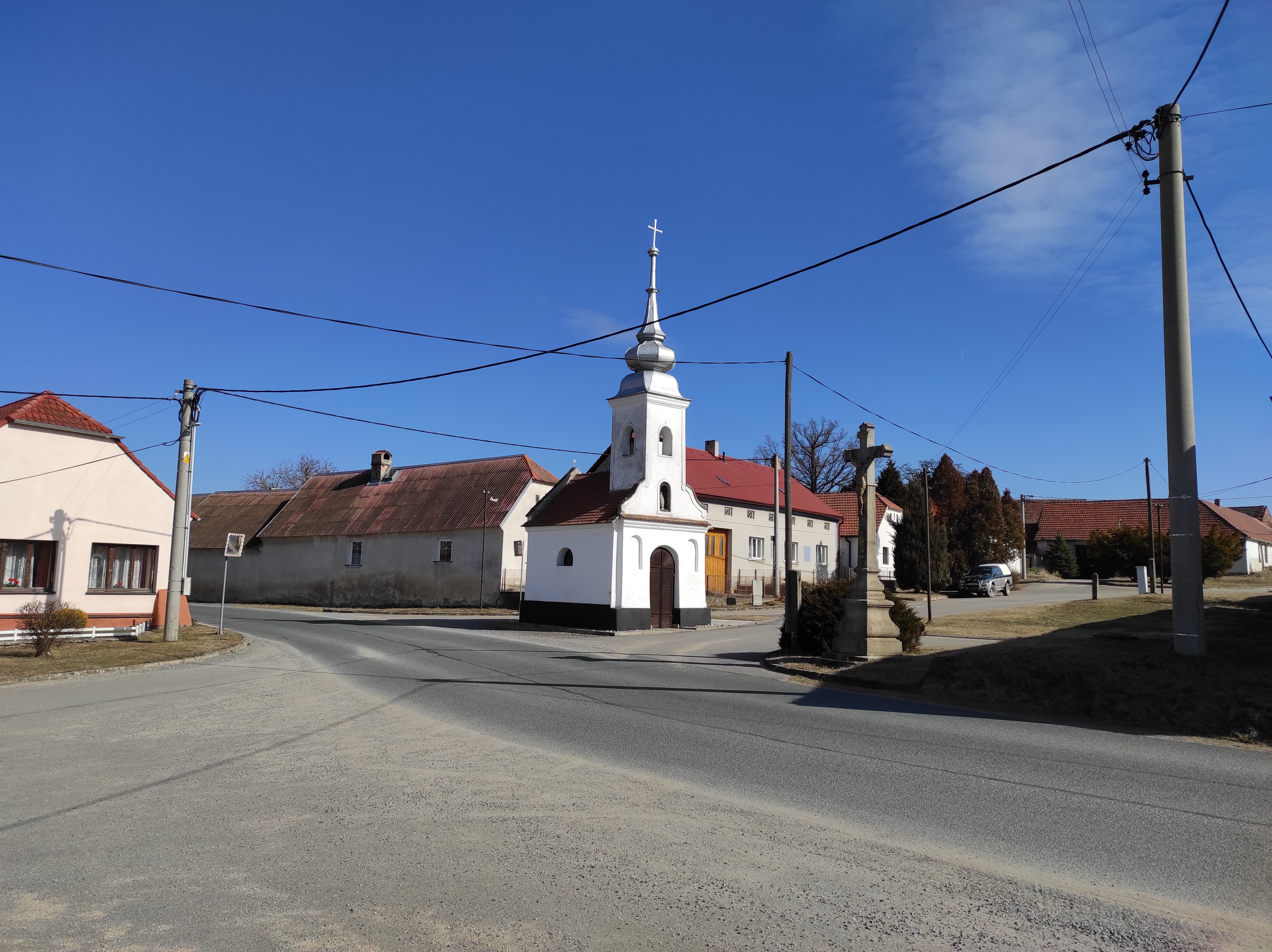
- Centre of Radkovice u Budče

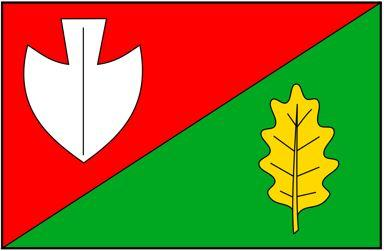
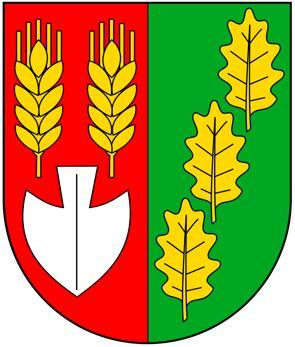
- Flag Coat of arms

- Location in the Czech Republic
- Coordinates: 49°4′57″N 15°37′18″E
- Country: Czech Republic
- Region: Vysočina
- District: Třebíč
- First mentioned: 1310

Area
  - Total: 5.31 km^{2} (2.05 sq mi)
- Elevation: 500 m (1,600 ft)

Population (2026-01-01)
  - Total: 144
  - Density: 27.1/km^{2} (70.2/sq mi)
- Time zone: UTC+1 (CET)
  - Summer (DST): UTC+2 (CEST)
- Postal code: 380 01
- Website: www.radkoviceubudce.eu

Radkovice u Budče is a municipality and village in Třebíč District in the Vysočina Region of the Czech Republic. It has about 100 inhabitants.

Radkovice u Budče lies approximately 24 kilometres (15 mi) south-west of Třebíč, 35 km (22 mi) south of Jihlava, and 142 km (88 mi) south-east of Prague.

== Demographics ==
Historical population
Year	Pop.	±%
1869	270	—
1880	277	+2.6%
1890	228	−17.7%
1900	226	−0.9%
1910	261	+15.5%
1921	260	−0.4%
1930	225	−13.5%
1950	212	−5.8%
1961	180	−15.1%
1970	161	−10.6%
1980	166	+3.1%
1991	136	−18.1%
2001	137	+0.7%
2011	151	+10.2%
2021	137	−9.3%
Source: Censuses
