= Lomy (Třebíč District) =

- Municipality
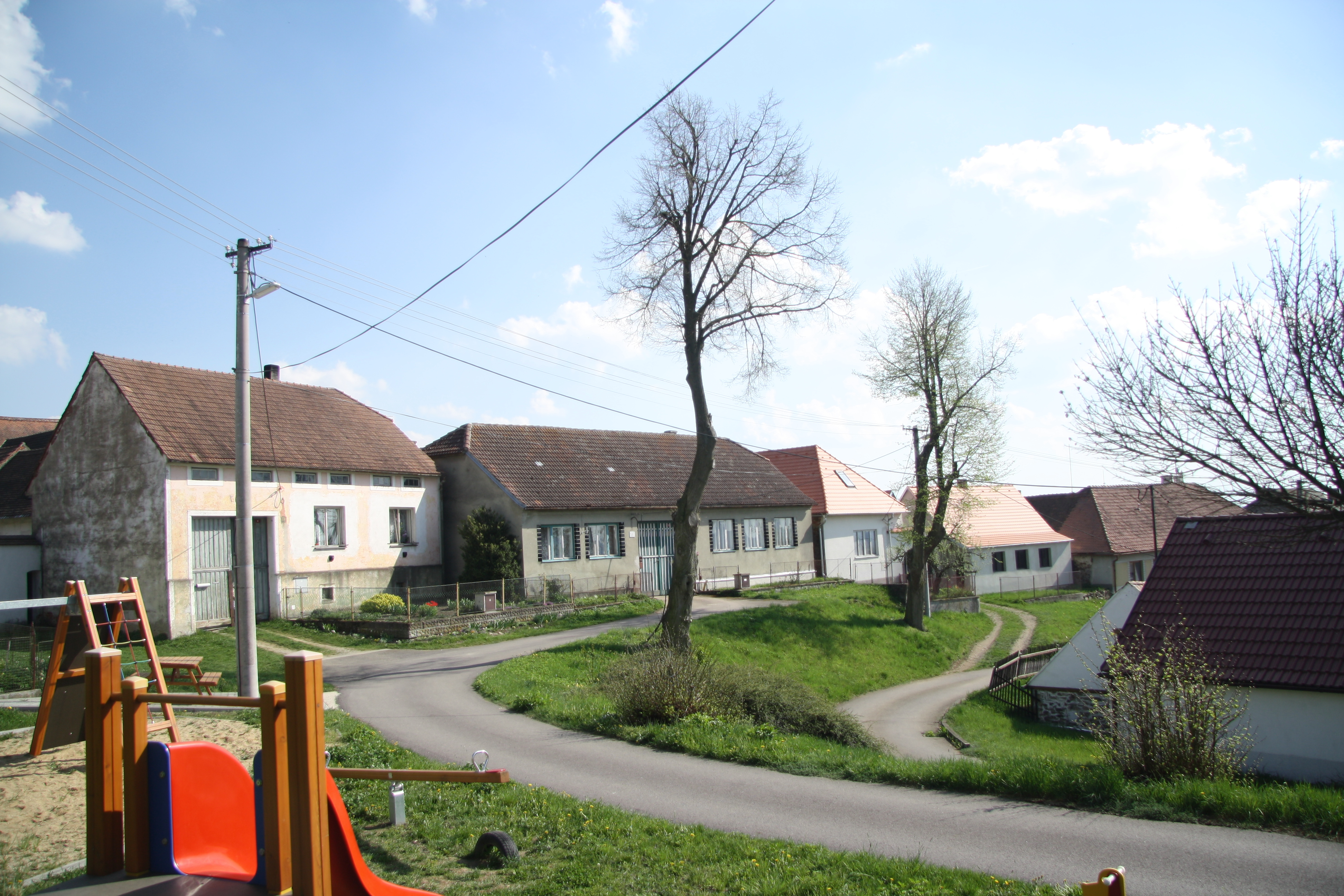
- Centre of Lomy

- Location in the Czech Republic
- Coordinates: 49°3′56″N 15°36′4″E
- Country: Czech Republic
- Region: Vysočina
- District: Třebíč
- First mentioned: 1373

Area
  - Total: 8.78 km^{2} (3.39 sq mi)
- Elevation: 545 m (1,788 ft)

Population (2026-01-01)
  - Total: 131
  - Density: 14.9/km^{2} (38.6/sq mi)
- Time zone: UTC+1 (CET)
  - Summer (DST): UTC+2 (CEST)
- Postal code: 675 31
- Website: www.obec-lomy.cz

Lomy is a municipality and village in Třebíč District in the Vysočina Region of the Czech Republic. It has about 100 inhabitants.

Lomy lies approximately 26 kilometres (16 mi) south-west of Třebíč, 37 km (23 mi) south of Jihlava, and 142 km (88 mi) south-east of Prague.

== Demographics ==
Historical population
Year	Pop.	±%
1869	292	—
1880	308	+5.5%
1890	299	−2.9%
1900	331	+10.7%
1910	301	−9.1%
1921	296	−1.7%
1930	305	+3.0%
1950	220	−27.9%
1961	219	−0.5%
1970	212	−3.2%
1980	177	−16.5%
1991	147	−16.9%
2001	153	+4.1%
2011	142	−7.2%
2021	135	−4.9%
Source: Censuses
