= Lubnice (Znojmo District) =

- Municipality
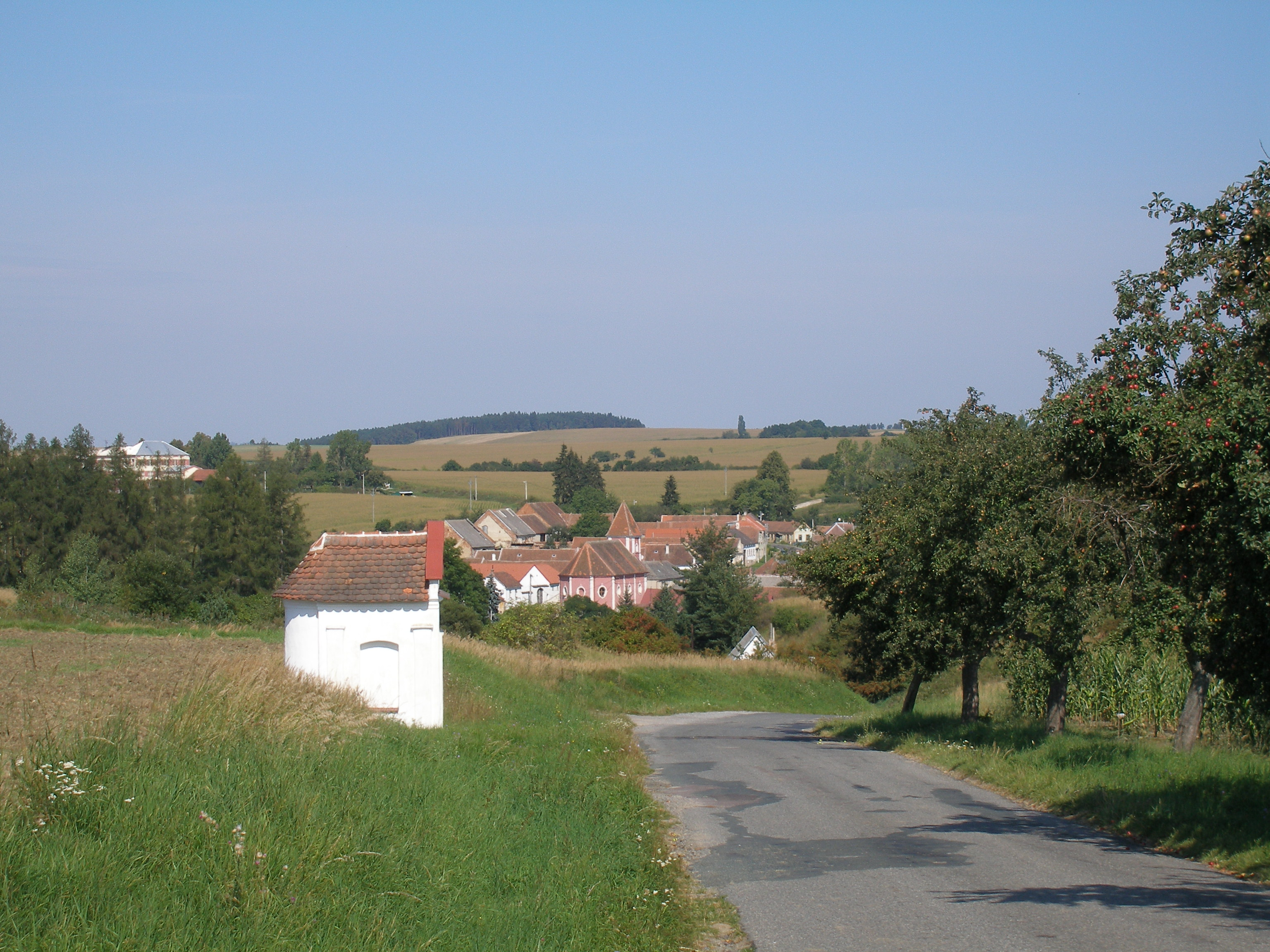
- View from the southeast

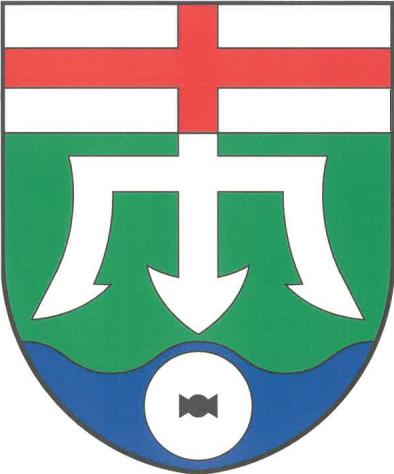
- Flag Coat of arms

- Location in the Czech Republic
- Coordinates: 48°56′22″N 15°36′50″E
- Country: Czech Republic
- Region: South Moravian
- District: Znojmo
- First mentioned: 1345

Area
  - Total: 7.57 km^{2} (2.92 sq mi)
- Elevation: 405 m (1,329 ft)

Population (2026-01-01)
  - Total: 58
  - Density: 7.7/km^{2} (20/sq mi)
- Time zone: UTC+1 (CET)
  - Summer (DST): UTC+2 (CEST)
- Postal code: 671 07
- Website: www.obec-lubnice.cz

Lubnice is a municipality and village in Znojmo District in the South Moravian Region of the Czech Republic. It has about 60 inhabitants.

Lubnice lies approximately 33 kilometres (21 mi) west of Znojmo, 79 km (49 mi) west of Brno, and 154 km (96 mi) south-east of Prague.

== Demographics ==
Historical population
Year	Pop.	±%
1869	301	—
1880	295	−2.0%
1890	270	−8.5%
1900	282	+4.4%
1910	259	−8.2%
1921	303	+17.0%
1930	303	+0.0%
1950	231	−23.8%
1961	205	−11.3%
1970	186	−9.3%
1980	143	−23.1%
1991	113	−21.0%
2001	90	−20.4%
2011	65	−27.8%
2021	56	−13.8%
Source: Censuses
