= Knínice (Jihlava District) =

- Municipality
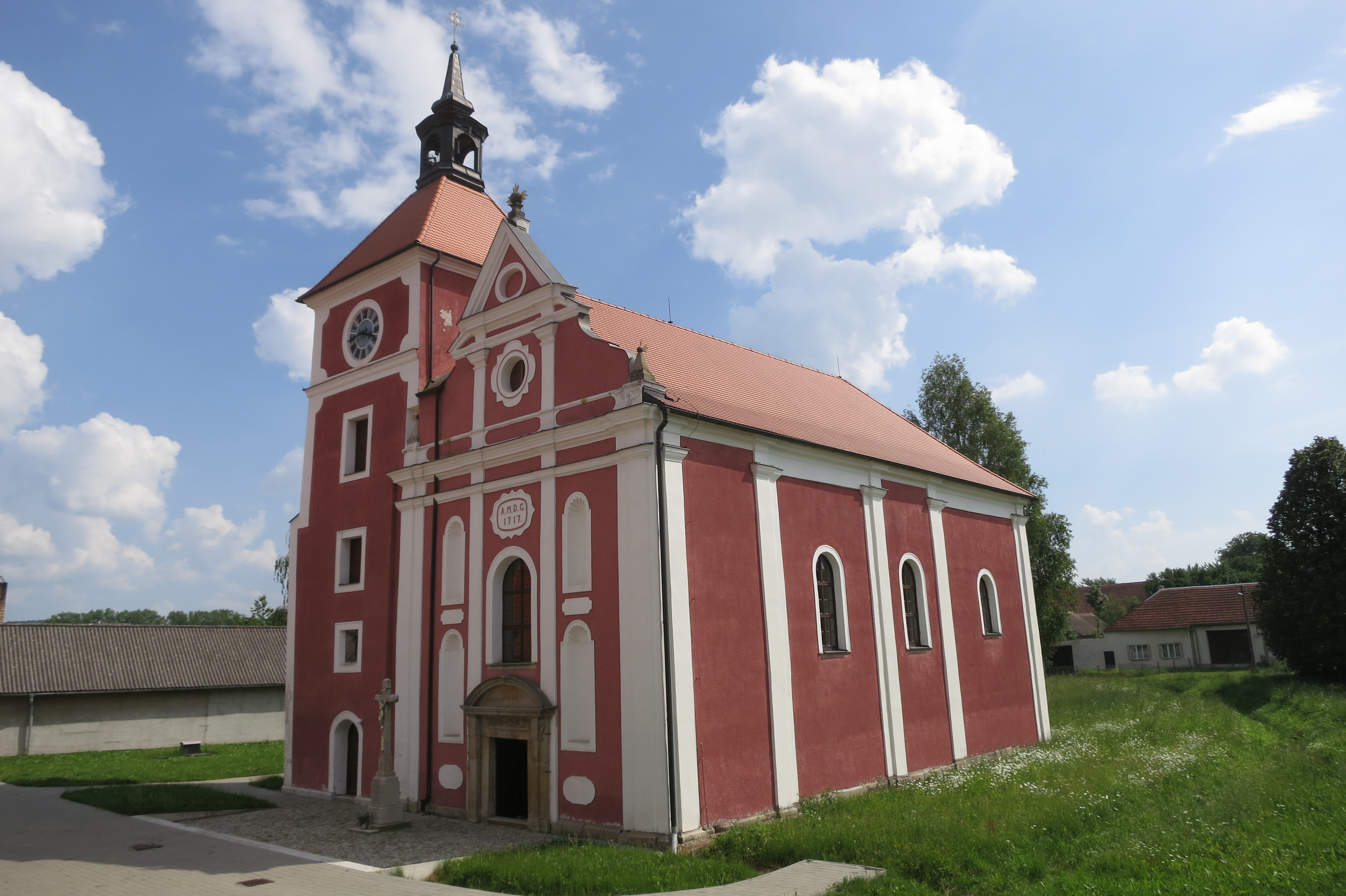
- Church of the Exaltation of the Holy Cross

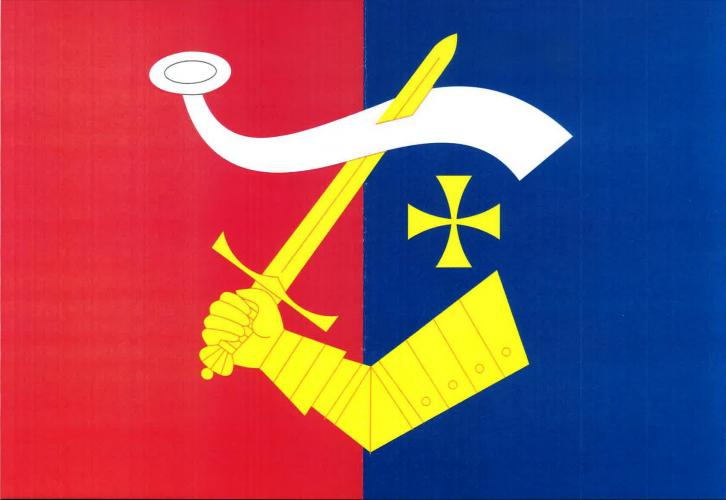
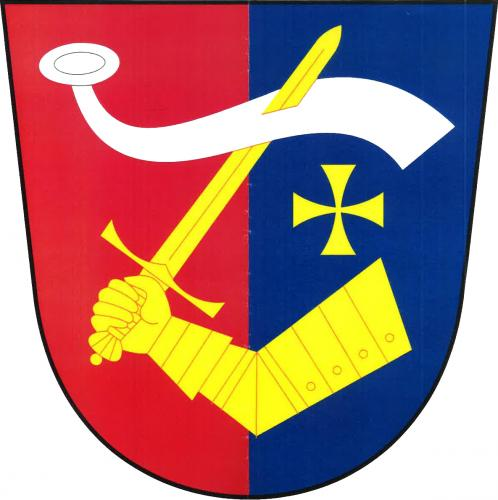
- Flag Coat of arms

- Location in the Czech Republic
- Coordinates: 49°5′39″N 15°36′15″E
- Country: Czech Republic
- Region: Vysočina
- District: Jihlava
- First mentioned: 1262

Area
  - Total: 10.65 km^{2} (4.11 sq mi)
- Elevation: 541 m (1,775 ft)

Population (2026-01-01)
  - Total: 192
  - Density: 18.0/km^{2} (46.7/sq mi)
- Time zone: UTC+1 (CET)
  - Summer (DST): UTC+2 (CEST)
- Postal code: 588 56
- Website: www.obec-kninice.cz

Knínice (Czech pronunciation: [ˈkɲiːɲɪtsɛ]; German: Kinitz) is a municipality and village in Jihlava District in the Vysočina Region of the Czech Republic. It has about 200 inhabitants.

Knínice lies approximately 34 kilometres (21 mi) south of Jihlava and 140 km (87 mi) south-east of Prague.

== Administrative division ==
Knínice consists of two municipal parts (in brackets population according to the 2021 census):

- Knínice (172)
- Bohusoudov (3)

== Demographics ==
Historical population
Year	Pop.	±%
1869	670	—
1880	662	−1.2%
1890	620	−6.3%
1900	645	+4.0%
1910	654	+1.4%
1921	647	−1.1%
1930	582	−10.0%
1950	458	−21.3%
1961	428	−6.6%
1970	361	−15.7%
1980	296	−18.0%
1991	215	−27.4%
2001	206	−4.2%
2011	186	−9.7%
2021	175	−5.9%
Source: Censuses
