= Meziříčko (Třebíč District) =

- Municipality
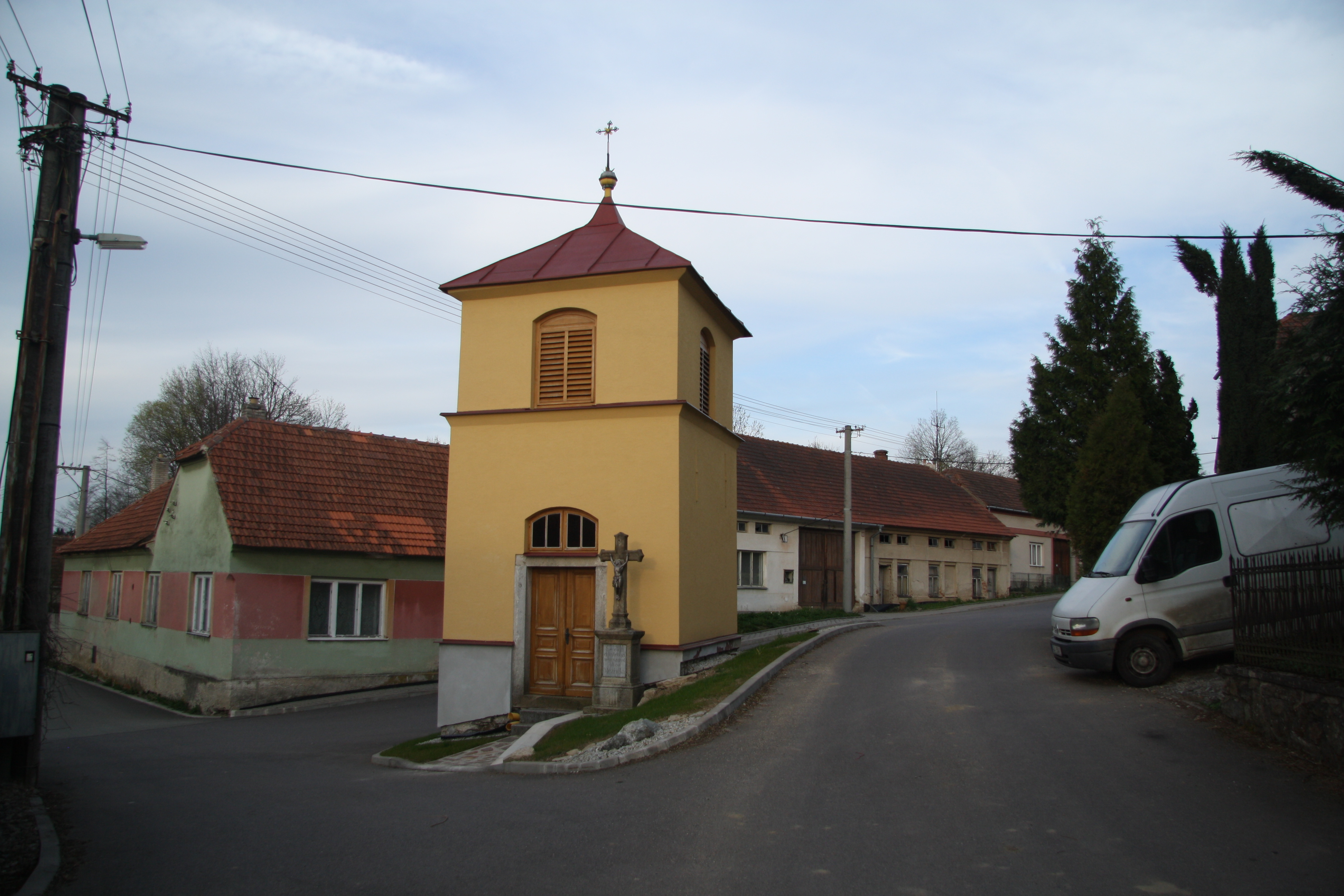
- Chapel in the centre of Meziříčko

- Location in the Czech Republic
- Coordinates: 49°6′34″N 15°39′37″E
- Country: Czech Republic
- Region: Vysočina
- District: Třebíč
- First mentioned: 1316

Area
  - Total: 4.98 km^{2} (1.92 sq mi)
- Elevation: 540 m (1,770 ft)

Population (2026-01-01)
  - Total: 84
  - Density: 17/km^{2} (44/sq mi)
- Time zone: UTC+1 (CET)
  - Summer (DST): UTC+2 (CEST)
- Postal code: 675 26
- Website: www.obecmeziricko.cz

Meziříčko is a municipality and village in Třebíč District in the Vysočina Region of the Czech Republic. It has about 80 inhabitants.

Meziříčko lies approximately 21 kilometres (13 mi) south-west of Třebíč, 33 km (21 mi) south of Jihlava, and 141 km (88 mi) south-east of Prague.

== Demographics ==
Historical population
Year	Pop.	±%
1869	242	—
1880	240	−0.8%
1890	237	−1.2%
1900	239	+0.8%
1910	218	−8.8%
1921	245	+12.4%
1930	224	−8.6%
1950	161	−28.1%
1961	151	−6.2%
1970	131	−13.2%
1980	118	−9.9%
1991	111	−5.9%
2001	99	−10.8%
2011	97	−2.0%
2021	76	−21.6%
Source: Censuses
