= Police (Třebíč District) =

- Municipality
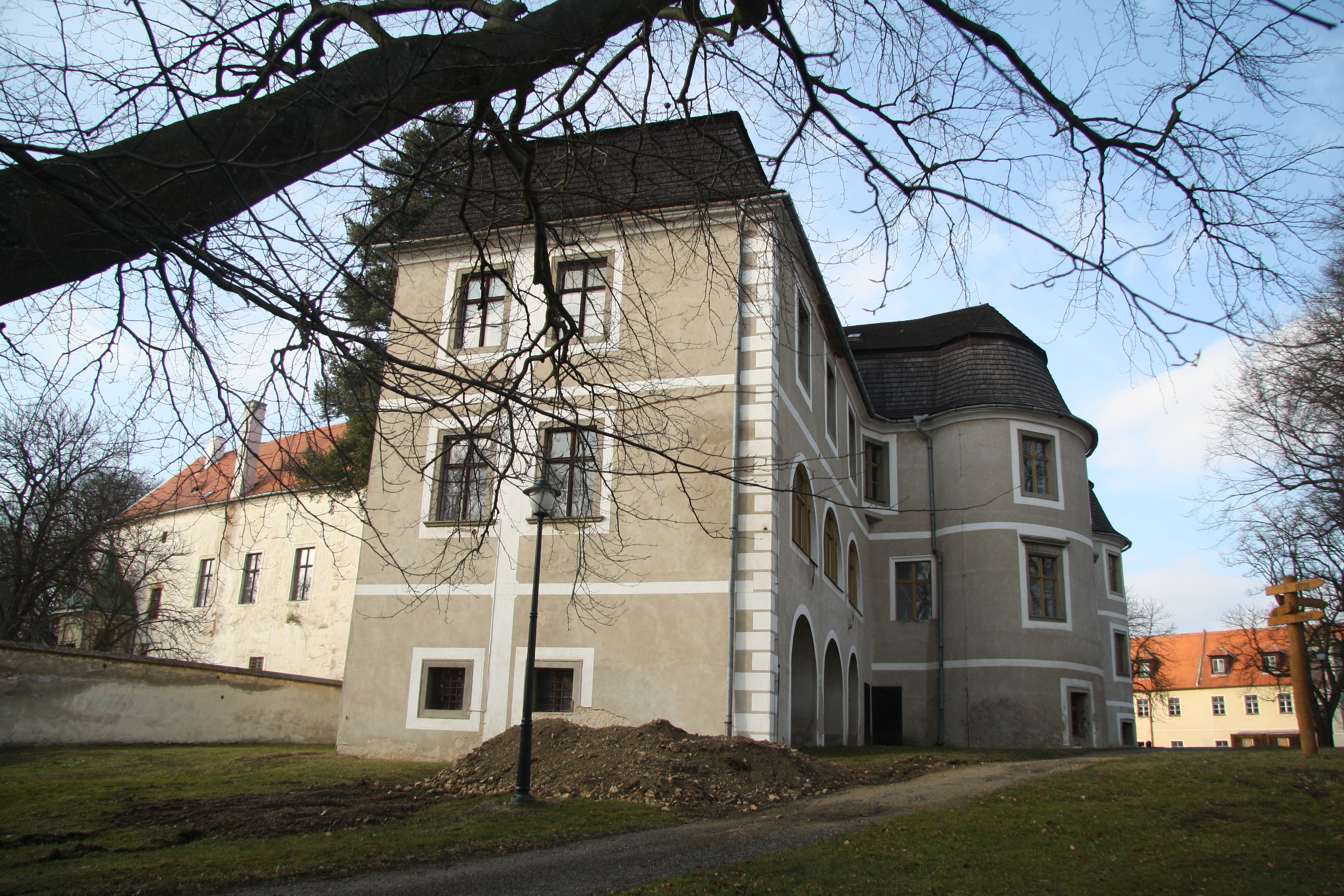
- Police Castle

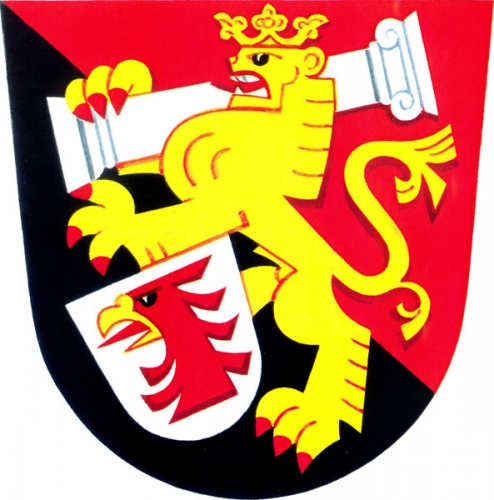
- Flag Coat of arms

- Location in the Czech Republic
- Coordinates: 48°57′56″N 15°37′49″E
- Country: Czech Republic
- Region: Vysočina
- District: Třebíč
- First mentioned: 1343

Area
  - Total: 5.97 km^{2} (2.31 sq mi)
- Elevation: 445 m (1,460 ft)

Population (2026-01-01)
  - Total: 319
  - Density: 53.4/km^{2} (138/sq mi)
- Time zone: UTC+1 (CET)
  - Summer (DST): UTC+2 (CEST)
- Postal code: 675 34
- Website: www.obec-police.cz

Police (German: Pullitz) is a municipality and village in Třebíč District in the Vysočina Region of the Czech Republic. It has about 300 inhabitants.

Police lies approximately 34 kilometres (21 mi) south-west of Třebíč, 48 km (30 mi) south of Jihlava, and 153 km (95 mi) south-east of Prague.

== Demographics ==
Historical population
Year	Pop.	±%
1869	801	—
1880	747	−6.7%
1890	762	+2.0%
1900	818	+7.3%
1910	804	−1.7%
1921	832	+3.5%
1930	731	−12.1%
1950	560	−23.4%
1961	583	+4.1%
1970	530	−9.1%
1980	455	−14.2%
1991	389	−14.5%
2001	384	−1.3%
2011	347	−9.6%
2021	337	−2.9%
Source: Censuses
