= Svojkovice (Jihlava District) =

- Municipality
- Northern part of Svojkovice

- Location in the Czech Republic
- Coordinates: 49°9′58″N 15°38′8″E
- Country: Czech Republic
- Region: Vysočina
- District: Jihlava
- First mentioned: 1257

Area
  - Total: 3.06 km^{2} (1.18 sq mi)
- Elevation: 628 m (2,060 ft)

Population (2026-01-01)
  - Total: 46
  - Density: 15/km^{2} (39/sq mi)
- Time zone: UTC+1 (CET)
  - Summer (DST): UTC+2 (CEST)
- Postal code: 588 56
- Website: www.svojkovice.cz

Svojkovice (Czech pronunciation: [ˈsvojkovɪtsɛ]) is a municipality and village in Jihlava District in the Vysočina Region of the Czech Republic. It has about 50 inhabitants.

Svojkovice lies approximately 27 kilometres (17 mi) south of Jihlava and 136 km (85 mi) south-east of Prague.

== Demographics ==
Historical population
Year	Pop.	±%
1869	272	—
1880	261	−4.0%
1890	257	−1.5%
1900	252	−1.9%
1910	245	−2.8%
1921	244	−0.4%
1930	179	−26.6%
1950	154	−14.0%
1961	177	+14.9%
1970	152	−14.1%
1980	99	−34.9%
1991	75	−24.2%
2001	64	−14.7%
2011	55	−14.1%
2021	43	−21.8%
Source: Censuses
