= Zárubice =

- Municipality
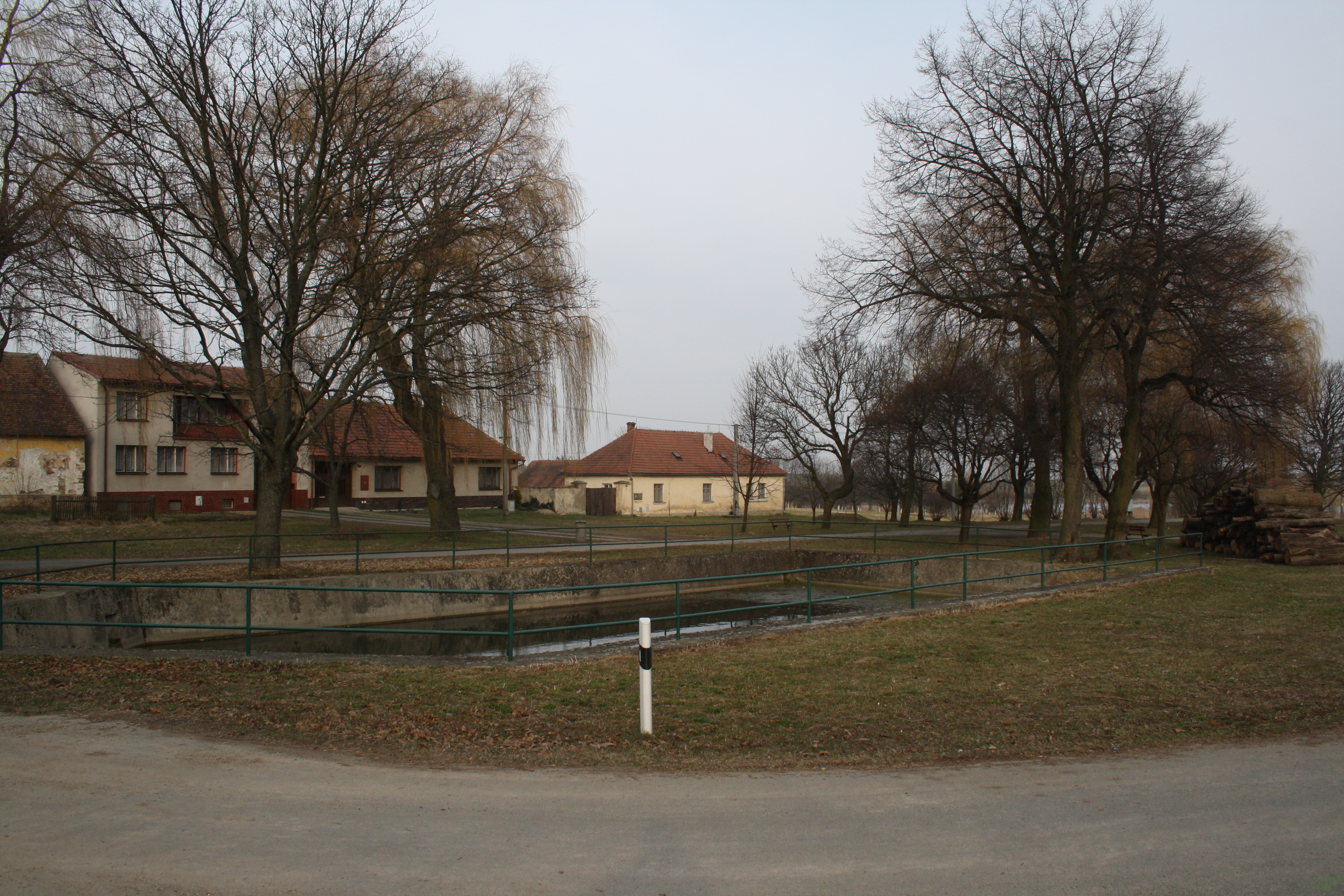
- Centre of Zárubice

- Flag Coat of arms

- Location in the Czech Republic
- Coordinates: 49°7′27″N 15°58′53″E
- Country: Czech Republic
- Region: Vysočina
- District: Třebíč
- First mentioned: 1349

Area
  - Total: 5.52 km^{2} (2.13 sq mi)
- Elevation: 501 m (1,644 ft)

Population (2026-01-01)
  - Total: 129
  - Density: 23.4/km^{2} (60.5/sq mi)
- Time zone: UTC+1 (CET)
  - Summer (DST): UTC+2 (CEST)
- Postal code: 675 52
- Website: www.zarubice.cz

Zárubice is a municipality and village in Třebíč District in the Vysočina Region of the Czech Republic. It has about 100 inhabitants.

Zárubice lies approximately 13 kilometres (8 mi) south-east of Třebíč, 42 km (26 mi) south-east of Jihlava, and 156 km (97 mi) south-east of Prague.

== Demographics ==
Historical population
Year	Pop.	±%
1869	242	—
1880	235	−2.9%
1890	251	+6.8%
1900	295	+17.5%
1910	278	−5.8%
1921	272	−2.2%
1930	271	−0.4%
1950	203	−25.1%
1961	210	+3.4%
1970	182	−13.3%
1980	154	−15.4%
1991	125	−18.8%
2001	116	−7.2%
2011	119	+2.6%
2021	118	−0.8%
Source: Censuses
