= Myslibořice =

- Municipality
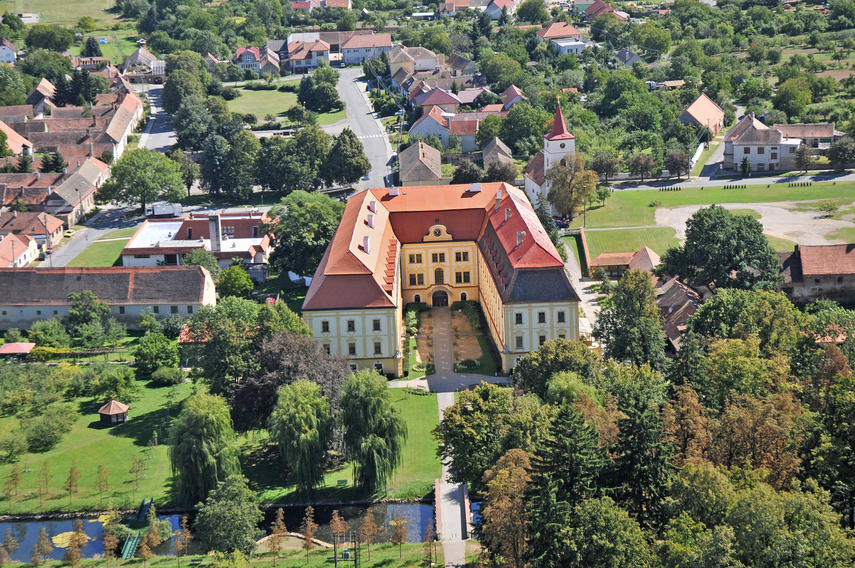
- Centre of Myslibořice with the castle

- Location in the Czech Republic
- Coordinates: 49°6′11″N 15°59′4″E
- Country: Czech Republic
- Region: Vysočina
- District: Třebíč
- First mentioned: 1271

Area
  - Total: 11.22 km^{2} (4.33 sq mi)
- Elevation: 483 m (1,585 ft)

Population (2026-01-01)
  - Total: 665
  - Density: 59.3/km^{2} (154/sq mi)
- Time zone: UTC+1 (CET)
  - Summer (DST): UTC+2 (CEST)
- Postal code: 675 60
- Website: www.mysliborice.cz

Myslibořice is a municipality and village in Třebíč District in the Vysočina Region of the Czech Republic. It has about 700 inhabitants.

Myslibořice lies approximately 15 kilometres (9 mi) south-east of Třebíč, 43 km (27 mi) south-east of Jihlava, and 157 km (98 mi) south-east of Prague.

== Demographics ==
Historical population
Year	Pop.	±%
1869	862	—
1880	878	+1.9%
1890	865	−1.5%
1900	950	+9.8%
1910	854	−10.1%
1921	878	+2.8%
1930	926	+5.5%
1950	692	−25.3%
1961	891	+28.8%
1970	825	−7.4%
1980	755	−8.5%
1991	664	−12.1%
2001	689	+3.8%
2011	734	+6.5%
2021	749	+2.0%
Source: Censuses
