= Oponešice =

- Municipality
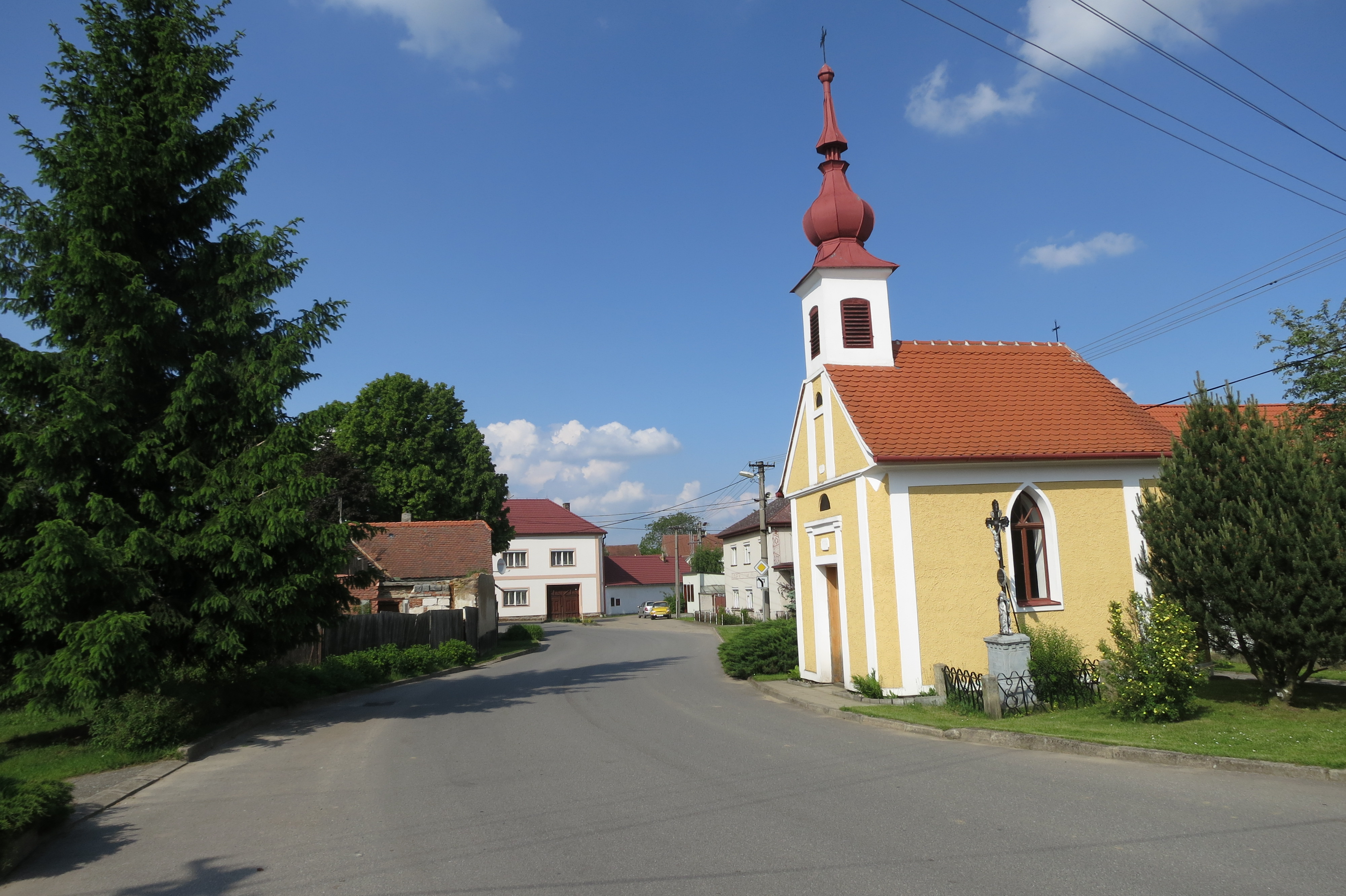
- Centre of Oponešice

- Location in the Czech Republic
- Coordinates: 49°2′16″N 15°39′7″E
- Country: Czech Republic
- Region: Vysočina
- District: Třebíč
- First mentioned: 1351

Area
  - Total: 5.17 km^{2} (2.00 sq mi)
- Elevation: 488 m (1,601 ft)

Population (2026-01-01)
  - Total: 183
  - Density: 35.4/km^{2} (91.7/sq mi)
- Time zone: UTC+1 (CET)
  - Summer (DST): UTC+2 (CEST)
- Postal code: 675 32
- Website: www.obecoponesice.cz

Oponešice is a municipality and village in Třebíč District in the Vysočina Region of the Czech Republic. It has about 200 inhabitants.

Oponešice lies approximately 27 kilometres (17 mi) south-west of Třebíč, 40 km (25 mi) south of Jihlava, and 146 km (91 mi) south-east of Prague.

== Demographics ==
Historical population
Year	Pop.	±%
1869	352	—
1880	374	+6.2%
1890	328	−12.3%
1900	324	−1.2%
1910	364	+12.3%
1921	375	+3.0%
1930	336	−10.4%
1950	337	+0.3%
1961	309	−8.3%
1970	268	−13.3%
1980	231	−13.8%
1991	228	−1.3%
2001	171	−25.0%
2011	186	+8.8%
2021	177	−4.8%
Source: Censuses
