= Kojatín =

- Municipality
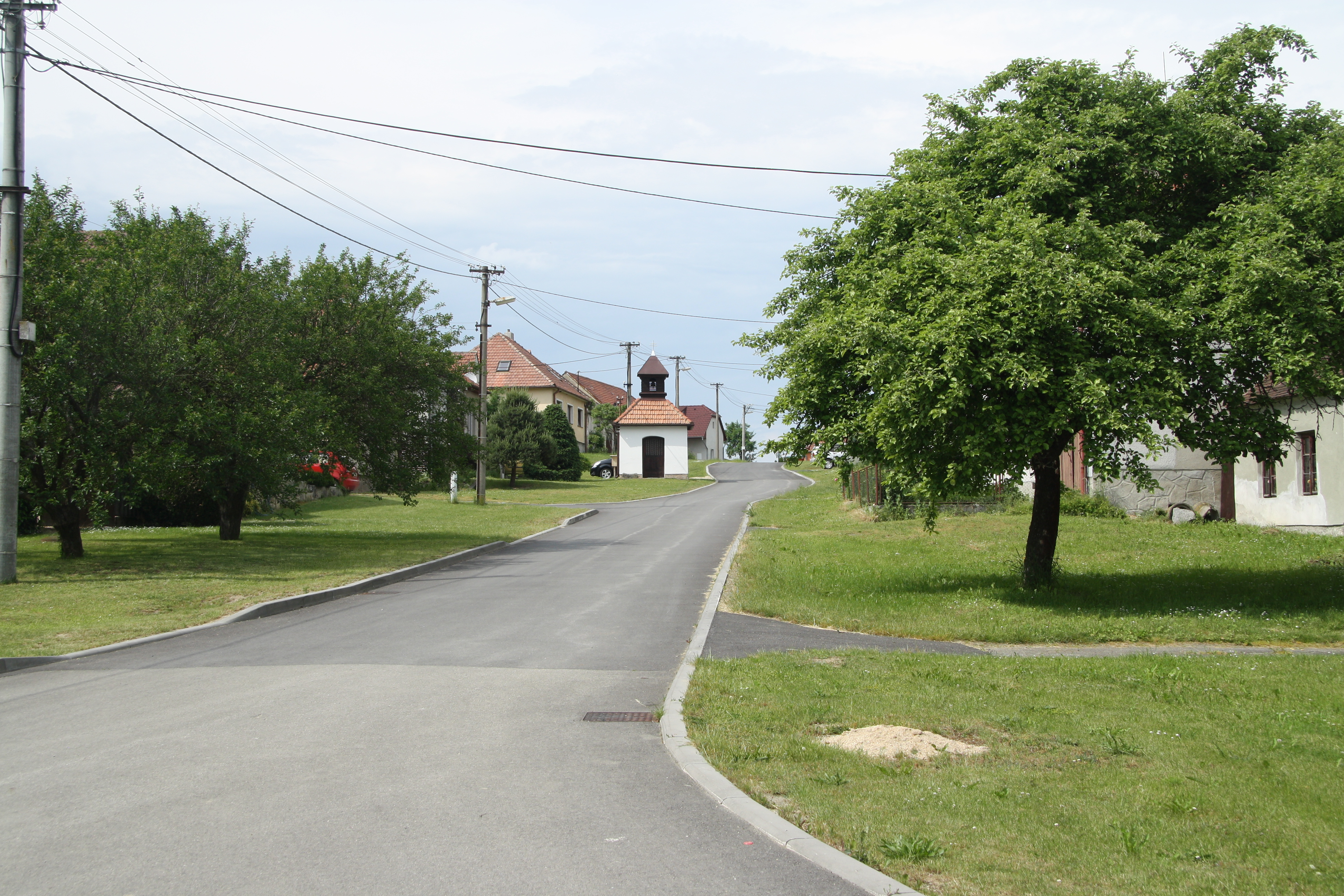
- Main street

- Location in the Czech Republic
- Coordinates: 49°14′34″N 16°0′37″E
- Country: Czech Republic
- Region: Vysočina
- District: Třebíč
- First mentioned: 1104

Area
  - Total: 4.48 km^{2} (1.73 sq mi)
- Elevation: 470 m (1,540 ft)

Population (2026-01-01)
  - Total: 87
  - Density: 19/km^{2} (50/sq mi)
- Time zone: UTC+1 (CET)
  - Summer (DST): UTC+2 (CEST)
- Postal code: 675 03
- Website: www.obeckojatin.cz

Kojatín is a municipality and village in Třebíč District in the Vysočina Region of the Czech Republic. It has about 90 inhabitants.

Kojatín lies approximately 11 kilometres (7 mi) east of Třebíč, 36 km (22 mi) south-east of Jihlava, and 149 km (93 mi) south-east of Prague.

== Demographics ==
Historical population
Year	Pop.	±%
1869	118	—
1880	116	−1.7%
1890	102	−12.1%
1900	114	+11.8%
1910	123	+7.9%
1921	123	+0.0%
1930	151	+22.8%
1950	135	−10.6%
1961	134	−0.7%
1970	124	−7.5%
1980	129	+4.0%
1991	74	−42.6%
2001	87	+17.6%
2011	71	−18.4%
2021	85	+19.7%
Source: Censuses
