= Čechočovice =

- Municipality
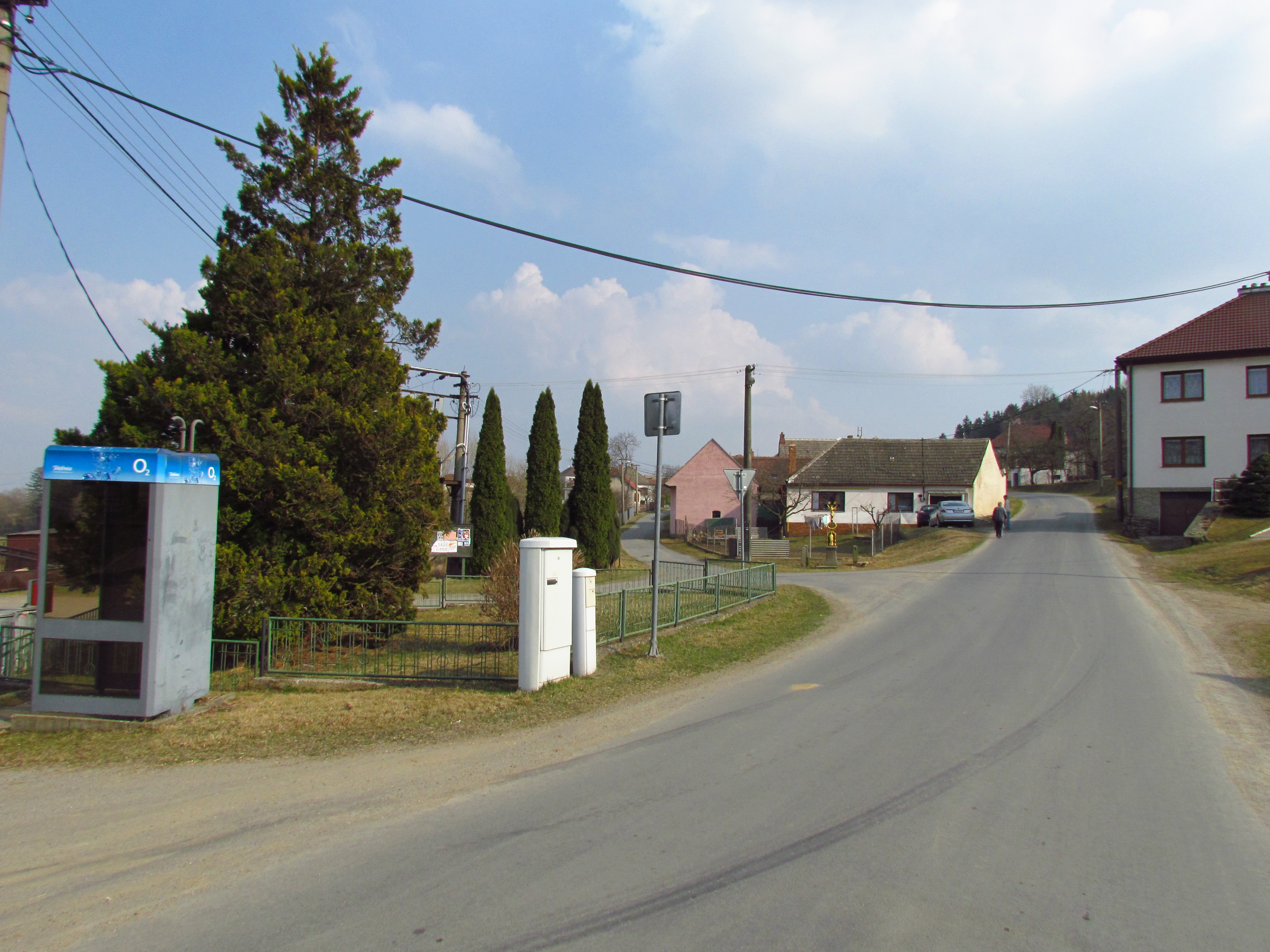
- Centre of Čechočovice

- Flag Coat of arms

- Location in the Czech Republic
- Coordinates: 49°12′10″N 15°47′37″E
- Country: Czech Republic
- Region: Vysočina
- District: Třebíč
- First mentioned: 1358

Area
  - Total: 3.94 km^{2} (1.52 sq mi)
- Elevation: 495 m (1,624 ft)

Population (2026-01-01)
  - Total: 350
  - Density: 89/km^{2} (230/sq mi)
- Time zone: UTC+1 (CET)
  - Summer (DST): UTC+2 (CEST)
- Postal code: 675 22
- Website: www.cechocovice.cz

Čechočovice is a municipality and village in Třebíč District in the Vysočina Region of the Czech Republic. It has about 400 inhabitants.

Čechočovice lies approximately 7 kilometres (4 mi) west of Třebíč, 27 km (17 mi) south-east of Jihlava, and 140 km (87 mi) south-east of Prague.

== Demographics ==
Historical population
Year	Pop.	±%
1869	254	—
1880	218	−14.2%
1890	236	+8.3%
1900	248	+5.1%
1910	263	+6.0%
1921	299	+13.7%
1930	341	+14.0%
1950	343	+0.6%
1961	346	+0.9%
1970	339	−2.0%
1980	313	−7.7%
1991	295	−5.8%
2001	283	−4.1%
2011	265	−6.4%
2021	322	+21.5%
Source: Censuses
