= Nimpšov =

- Municipality
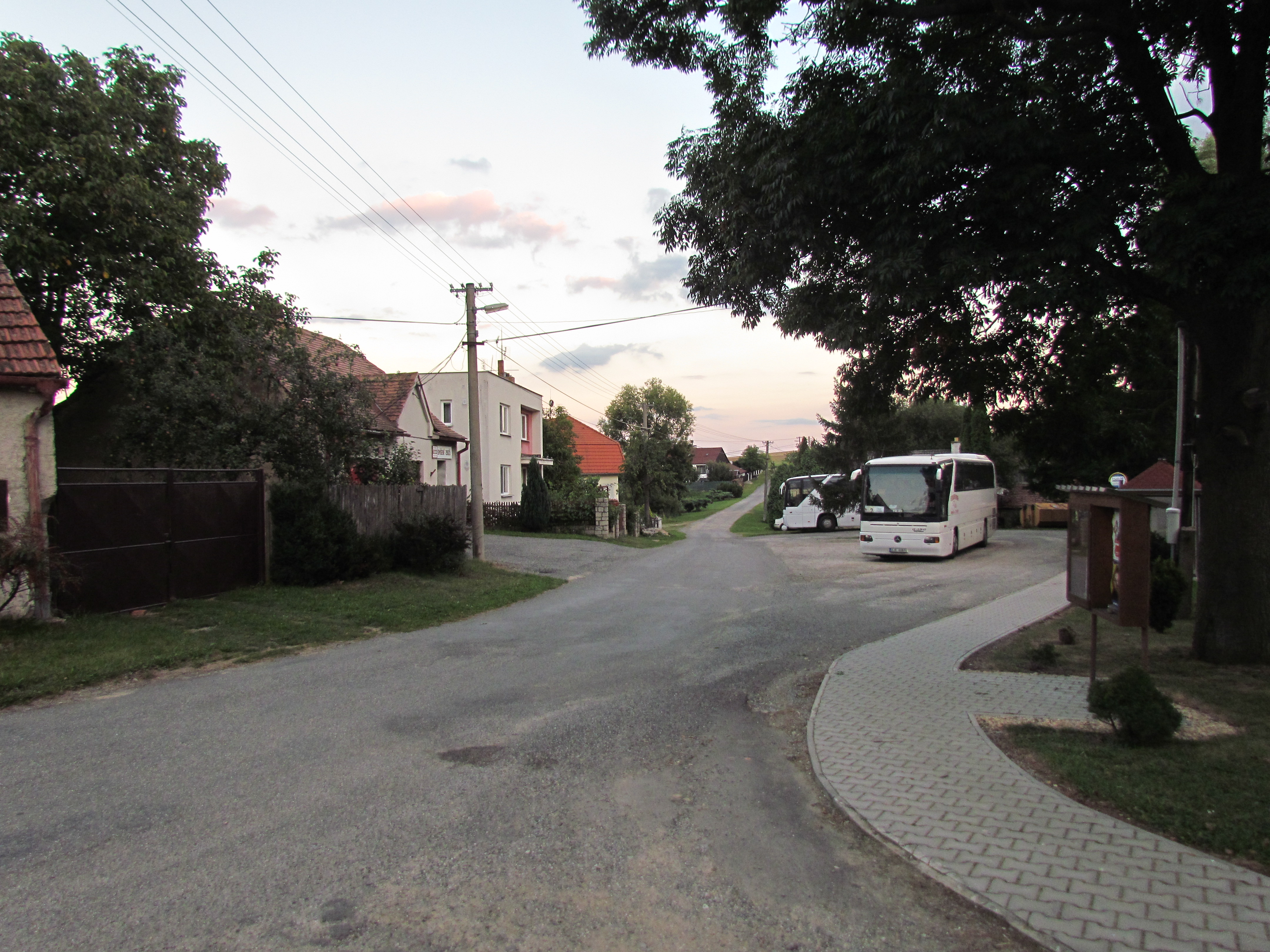
- Centre of Nimpšov

- Flag Coat of arms

- Location in the Czech Republic
- Coordinates: 49°1′22″N 15°44′50″E
- Country: Czech Republic
- Region: Vysočina
- District: Třebíč
- Founded: 1785

Area
  - Total: 0.98 km^{2} (0.38 sq mi)
- Elevation: 460 m (1,510 ft)

Population (2026-01-01)
  - Total: 58
  - Density: 59/km^{2} (150/sq mi)
- Time zone: UTC+1 (CET)
  - Summer (DST): UTC+2 (CEST)
- Postal code: 675 41
- Website: www.nimpsov.cz

Nimpšov is a municipality and village in Třebíč District in the Vysočina Region of the Czech Republic. It has about 60 inhabitants.

Nimpšov lies approximately 25 kilometres (16 mi) south-west of Třebíč, 43 km (27 mi) south of Jihlava, and 152 km (94 mi) south-east of Prague.

== Demographics ==
Historical population
Year	Pop.	±%
1869	239	—
1880	247	+3.3%
1890	307	+24.3%
1900	297	−3.3%
1910	282	−5.1%
1921	266	−5.7%
1930	229	−13.9%
1950	146	−36.2%
1961	149	+2.1%
1970	126	−15.4%
1980	105	−16.7%
1991	91	−13.3%
2001	72	−20.9%
2011	59	−18.1%
2021	52	−11.9%
Source: Censuses
