= Bochovice =

- Municipality
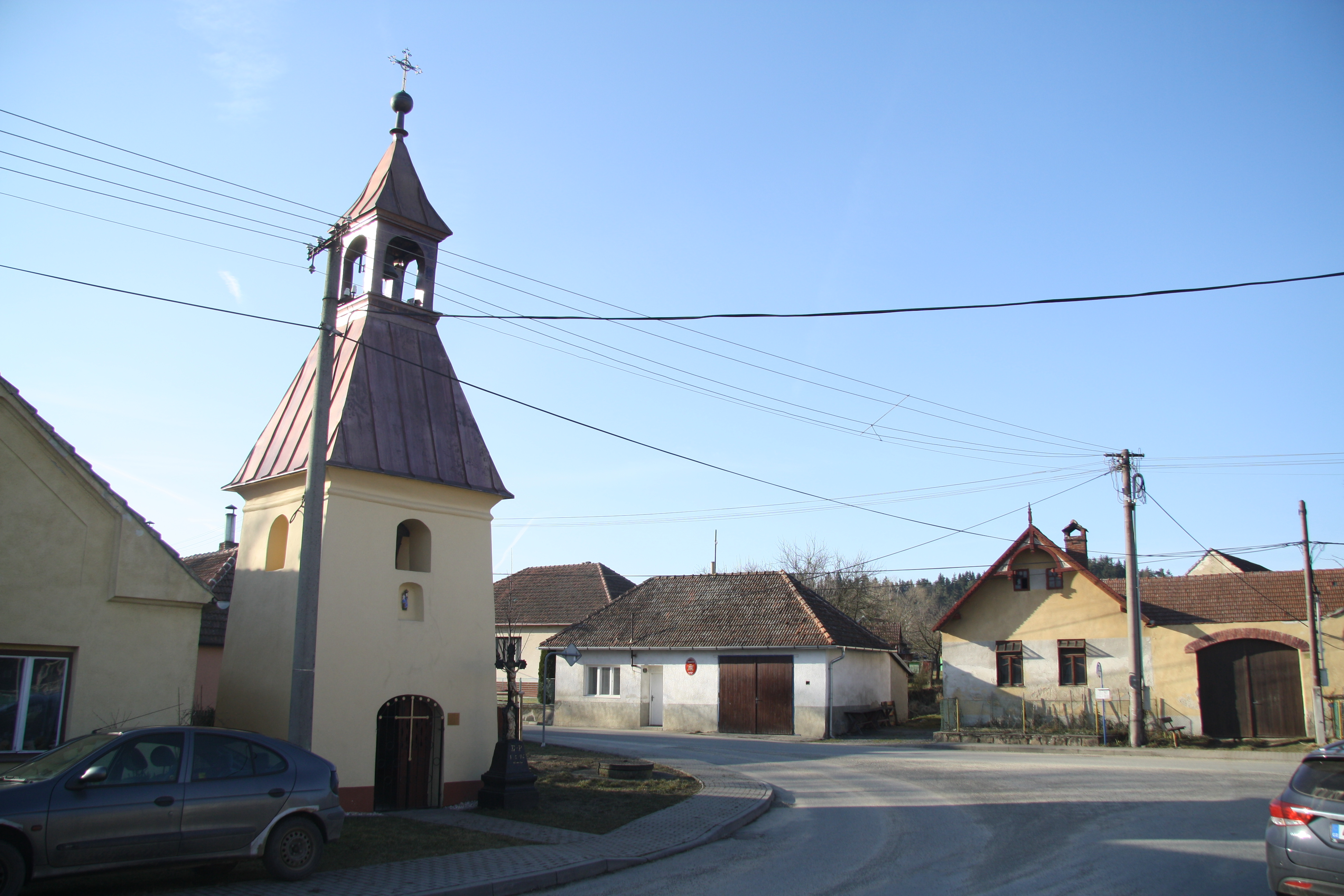
- Centre of Bochovice

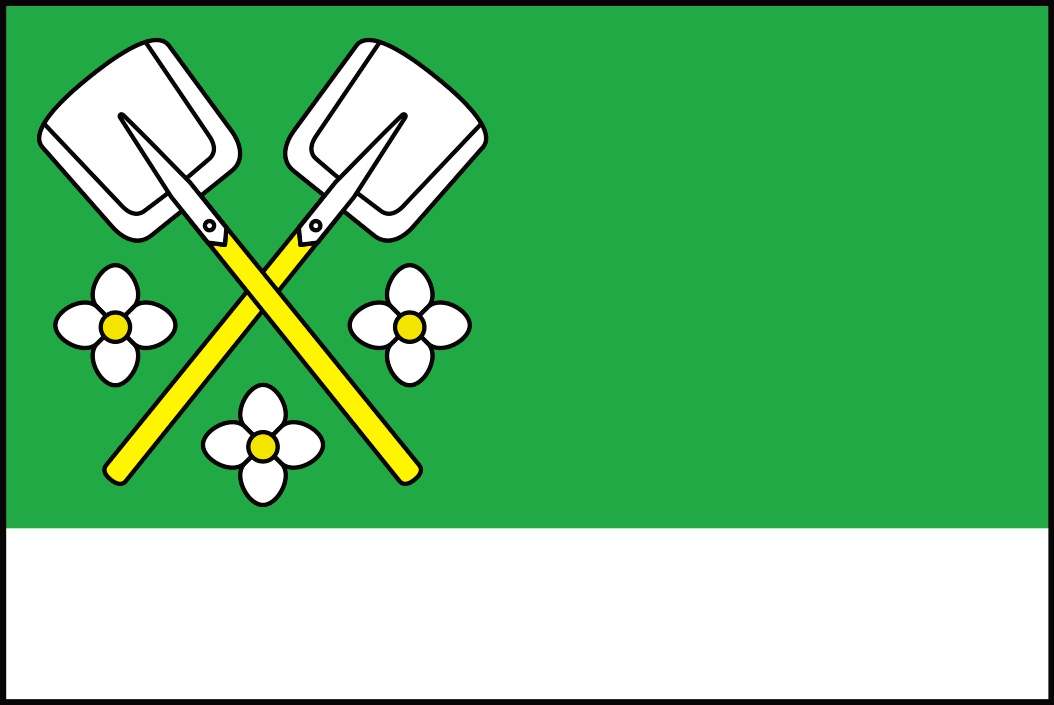
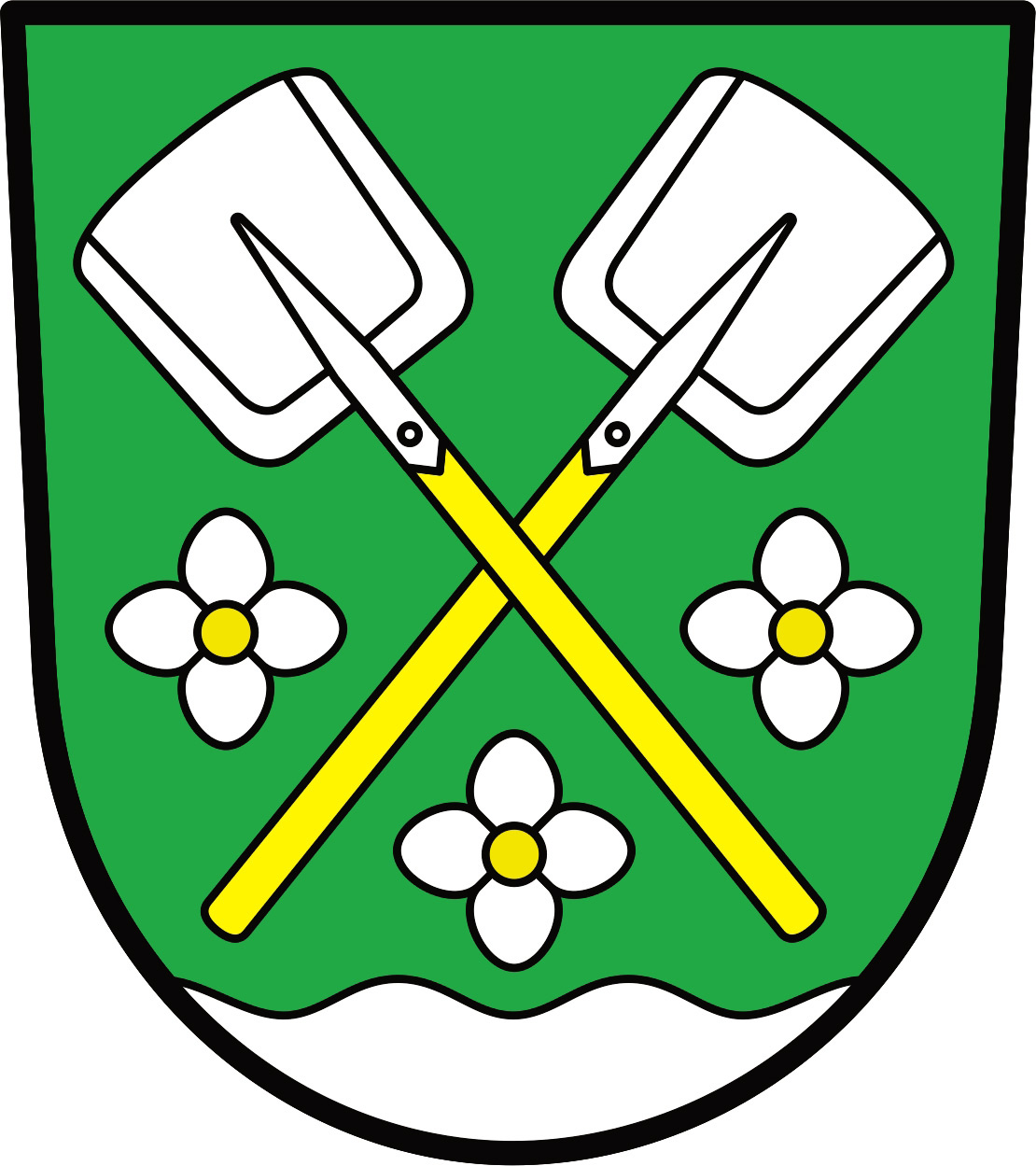
- Flag Coat of arms

- Location in the Czech Republic
- Coordinates: 49°19′15″N 15°53′47″E
- Country: Czech Republic
- Region: Vysočina
- District: Třebíč
- First mentioned: 1353

Area
  - Total: 5.85 km^{2} (2.26 sq mi)
- Elevation: 514 m (1,686 ft)

Population (2026-01-01)
  - Total: 153
  - Density: 26.2/km^{2} (67.7/sq mi)
- Time zone: UTC+1 (CET)
  - Summer (DST): UTC+2 (CEST)
- Postal code: 675 05
- Website: www.bochovice.cz

Bochovice is a municipality and village in Třebíč District in the Vysočina Region of the Czech Republic. It has about 200 inhabitants.

Bochovice lies approximately 12 kilometres (7 mi) north of Třebíč, 25 km (16 mi) east of Jihlava, and 138 km (86 mi) south-east of Prague.

== Administrative division ==
Bochovice consists of two municipal parts (in brackets population according to the 2021 census):

- Bochovice (91)
- Batouchovice (47)

== Demographics ==
Historical population
Year	Pop.	±%
1869	280	—
1880	266	−5.0%
1890	278	+4.5%
1900	310	+11.5%
1910	309	−0.3%
1921	311	+0.6%
1930	314	+1.0%
1950	270	−14.0%
1961	267	−1.1%
1970	228	−14.6%
1980	221	−3.1%
1991	189	−14.5%
2001	162	−14.3%
2011	143	−11.7%
2021	138	−3.5%
Source: Censuses
