= Radonín =

- Municipality
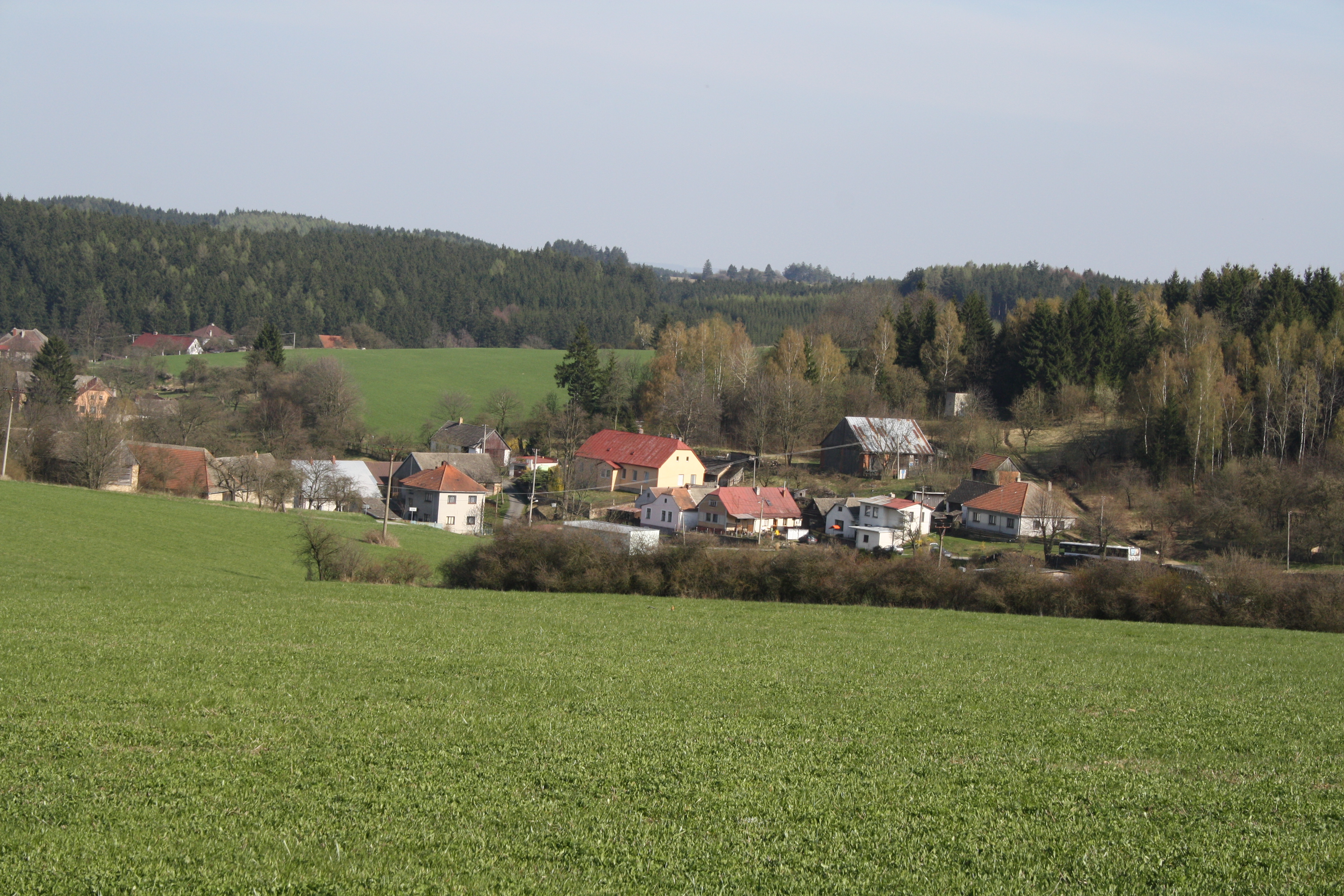
- View from the west

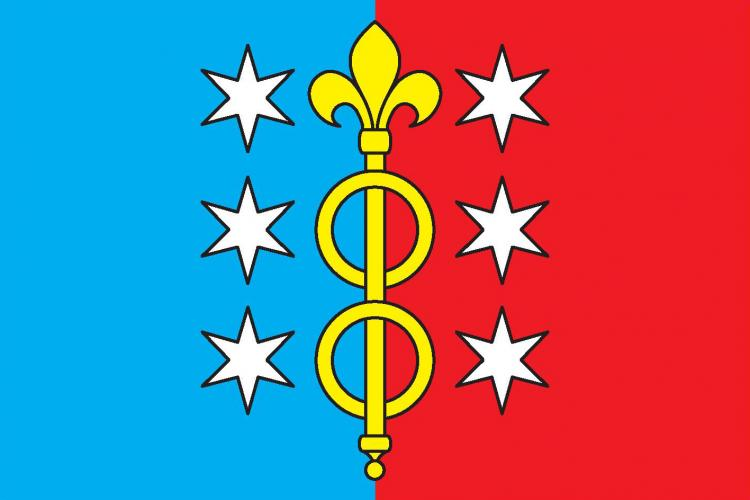
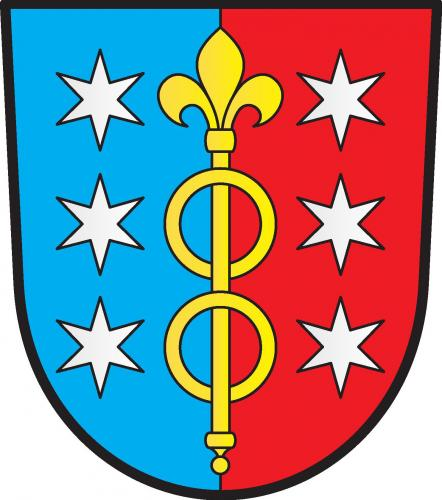
- Flag Coat of arms

- Location in the Czech Republic
- Coordinates: 49°16′47″N 15°43′27″E
- Country: Czech Republic
- Region: Vysočina
- District: Třebíč
- First mentioned: 1224

Area
  - Total: 3.98 km^{2} (1.54 sq mi)
- Elevation: 542 m (1,778 ft)

Population (2026-01-01)
  - Total: 94
  - Density: 24/km^{2} (61/sq mi)
- Time zone: UTC+1 (CET)
  - Summer (DST): UTC+2 (CEST)
- Postal code: 675 21
- Website: www.radonin.cz

Radonín is a municipality and village in Třebíč District in the Vysočina Region of the Czech Republic. It has about 90 inhabitants.

Radonín lies approximately 14 kilometres (9 mi) north-west of Třebíč, 17 km (11 mi) south-east of Jihlava, and 130 km (81 mi) south-east of Prague.

== Demographics ==
Historical population
Year	Pop.	±%
1869	207	—
1880	203	−1.9%
1890	188	−7.4%
1900	197	+4.8%
1910	177	−10.2%
1921	167	−5.6%
1930	169	+1.2%
1950	174	+3.0%
1961	157	−9.8%
1970	131	−16.6%
1980	105	−19.8%
1991	73	−30.5%
2001	77	+5.5%
2011	72	−6.5%
2021	79	+9.7%
Source: Censuses
