= Vícenice u Náměště nad Oslavou =

- Municipality
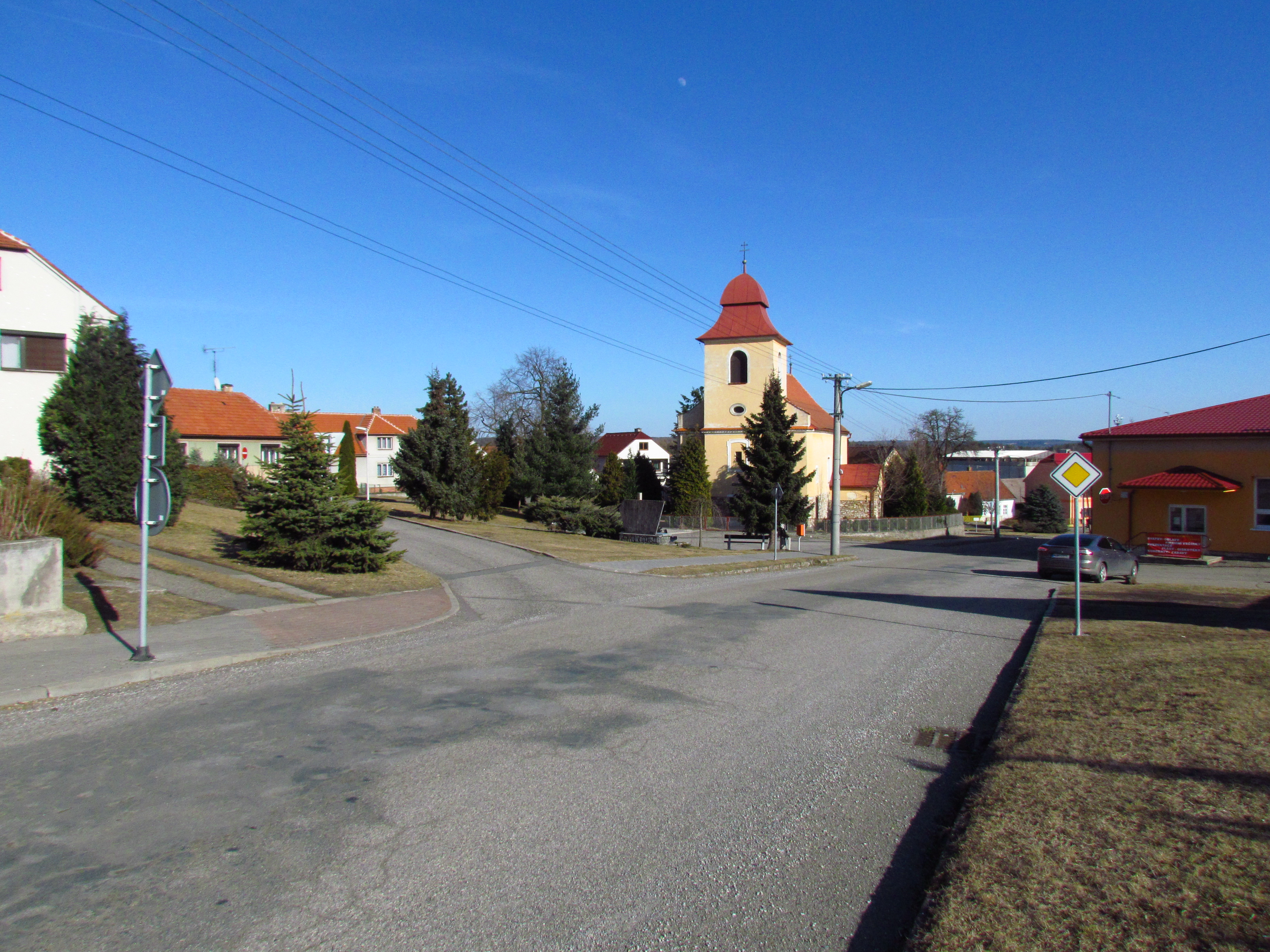
- Centre of Vícenice u Náměště nad Oslavou

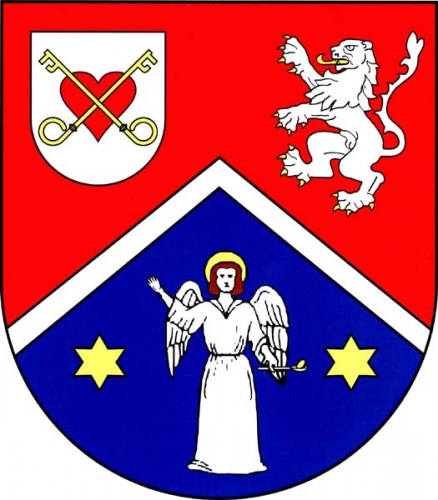
- Flag Coat of arms

- Location in the Czech Republic
- Coordinates: 49°12′10″N 16°7′34″E
- Country: Czech Republic
- Region: Vysočina
- District: Třebíč
- First mentioned: 1376

Area
  - Total: 5.95 km^{2} (2.30 sq mi)
- Elevation: 430 m (1,410 ft)

Population (2026-01-01)
  - Total: 423
  - Density: 71.1/km^{2} (184/sq mi)
- Time zone: UTC+1 (CET)
  - Summer (DST): UTC+2 (CEST)
- Postal code: 675 71
- Website: www.viceniceun.cz

Vícenice u Náměště nad Oslavou is a municipality and village in Třebíč District in the Vysočina Region of the Czech Republic. It has about 400 inhabitants.

Vícenice u Náměště nad Oslavou lies approximately 19 kilometres (12 mi) east of Třebíč, 45 km (28 mi) south-east of Jihlava, and 158 km (98 mi) south-east of Prague.

== Demographics ==
Historical population
Year	Pop.	±%
1869	355	—
1880	368	+3.7%
1890	362	−1.6%
1900	402	+11.0%
1910	414	+3.0%
1921	417	+0.7%
1930	468	+12.2%
1950	412	−12.0%
1961	461	+11.9%
1970	439	−4.8%
1980	404	−8.0%
1991	352	−12.9%
2001	358	+1.7%
2011	366	+2.2%
2021	404	+10.4%
Source: Censuses
