= Číhalín =

- Municipality
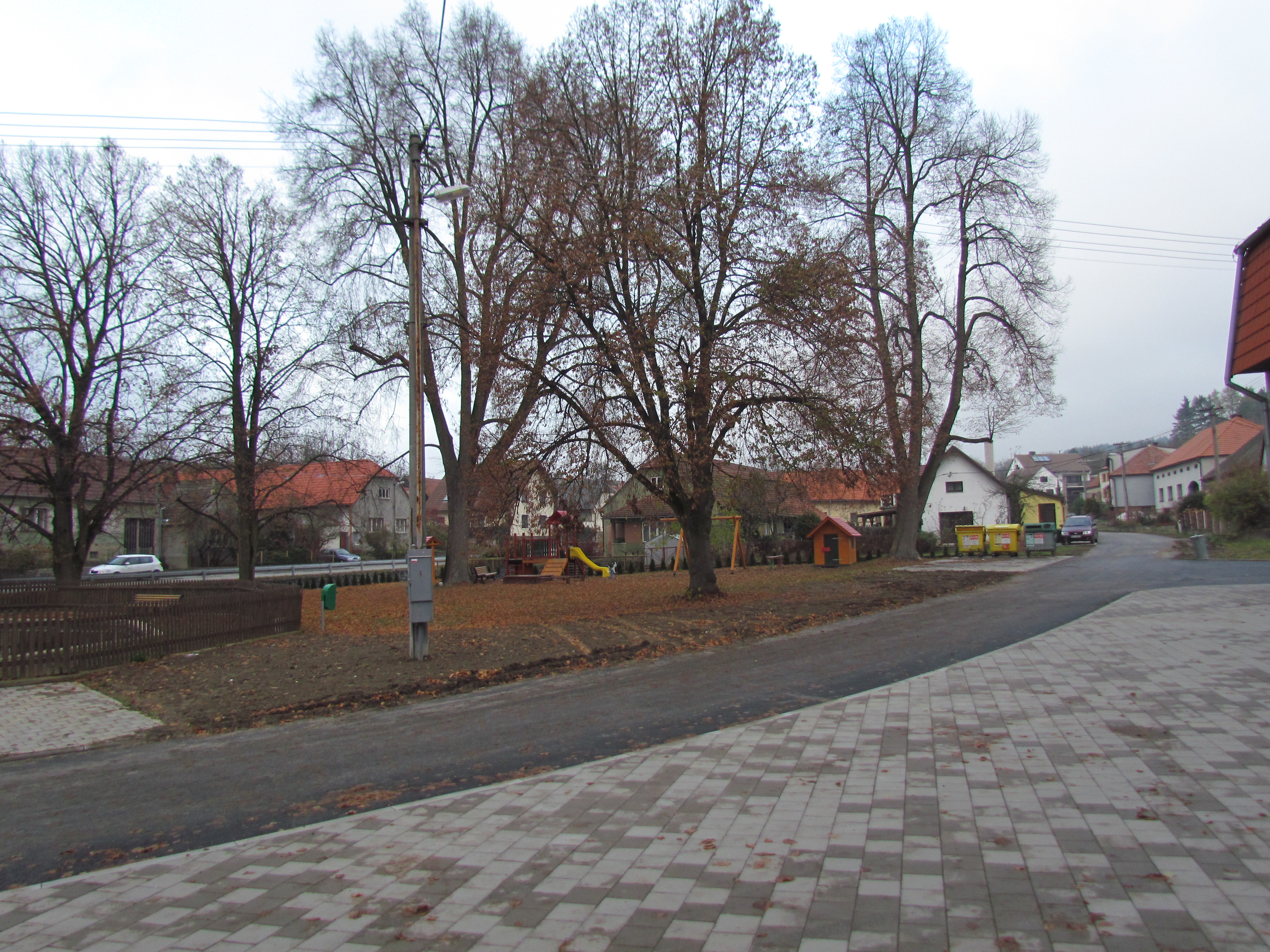
- Centre of Číhalín

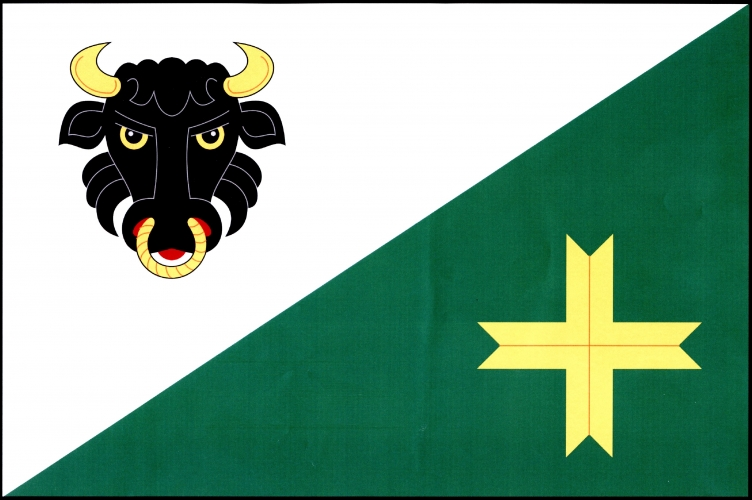
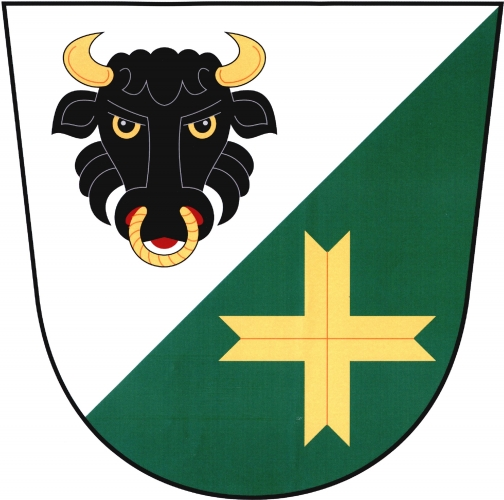
- Flag Coat of arms

- Location in the Czech Republic
- Coordinates: 49°16′7″N 15°48′43″E
- Country: Czech Republic
- Region: Vysočina
- District: Třebíč
- First mentioned: 1538

Area
  - Total: 6.34 km^{2} (2.45 sq mi)
- Elevation: 489 m (1,604 ft)

Population (2026-01-01)
  - Total: 238
  - Density: 37.5/km^{2} (97.2/sq mi)
- Time zone: UTC+1 (CET)
  - Summer (DST): UTC+2 (CEST)
- Postal code: 675 07
- Website: www.cihalin.cz

Číhalín is a municipality and village in Třebíč District in the Vysočina Region of the Czech Republic. It has about 200 inhabitants.

Číhalín lies approximately 8 kilometres (5 mi) north-west of Třebíč, 22 km (14 mi) south-east of Jihlava, and 136 km (85 mi) south-east of Prague.

== History ==
The first written mention of Číhalín is from 1538.

== Demographics ==
Historical population
Year	Pop.	±%
1869	278	—
1880	272	−2.2%
1890	265	−2.6%
1900	283	+6.8%
1910	298	+5.3%
1921	318	+6.7%
1930	339	+6.6%
1950	317	−6.5%
1961	350	+10.4%
1970	234	−33.1%
1980	224	−4.3%
1991	179	−20.1%
2001	185	+3.4%
2011	192	+3.8%
2021	221	+15.1%
Source: Censuses
