= Ocmanice =

- Municipality
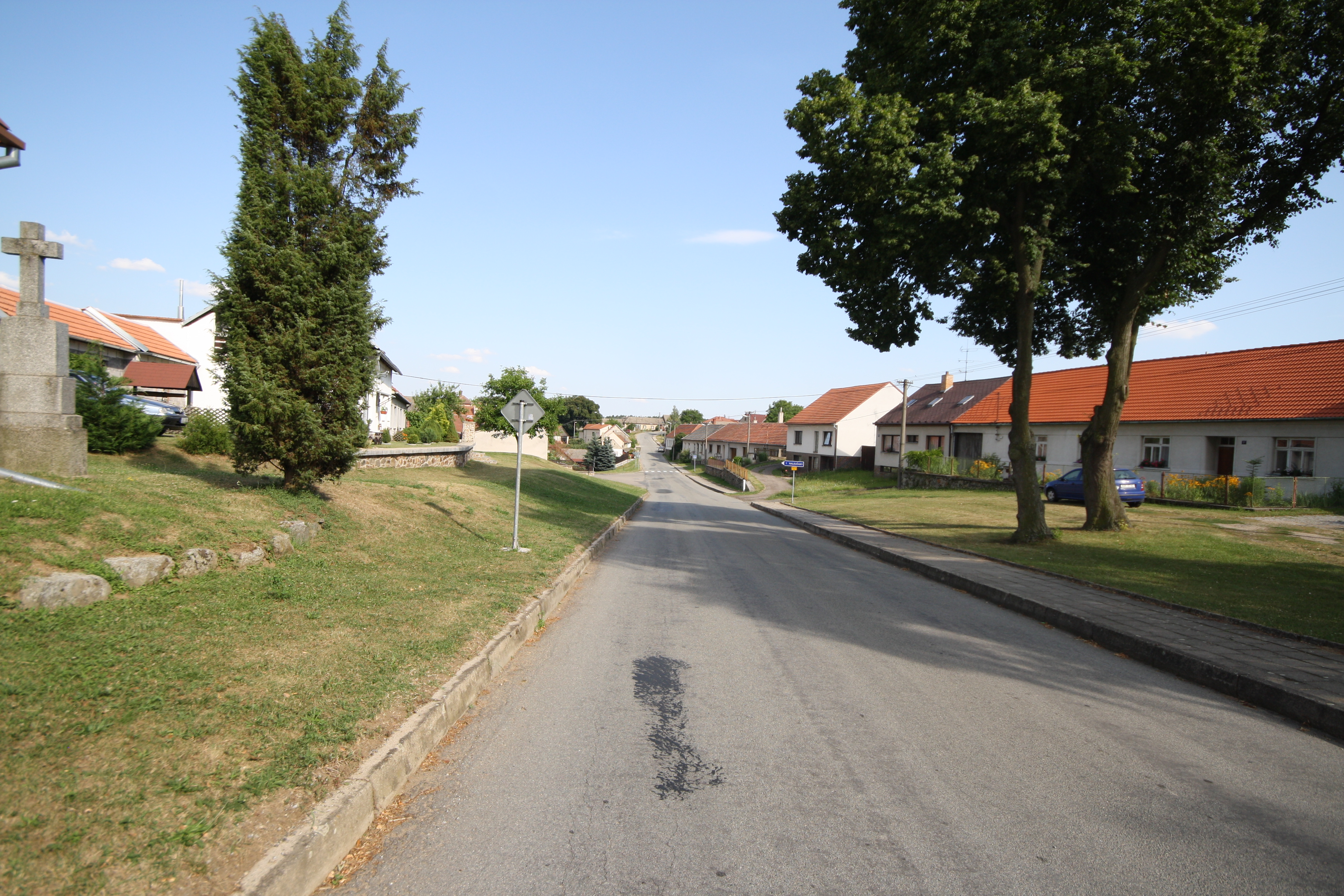
- Centre of Ocmanice

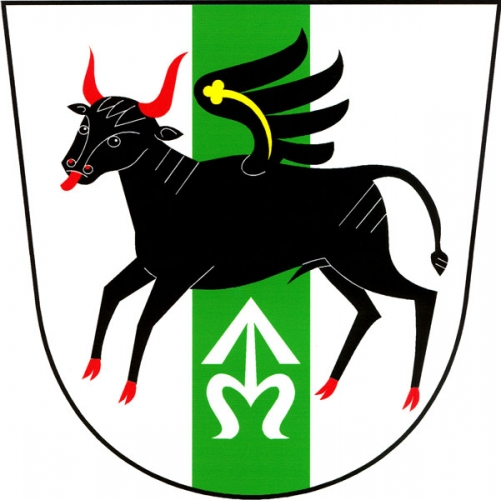
- Flag Coat of arms

- Location in the Czech Republic
- Coordinates: 49°13′59″N 16°7′31″E
- Country: Czech Republic
- Region: Vysočina
- District: Třebíč
- First mentioned: 1366

Area
  - Total: 7.06 km^{2} (2.73 sq mi)
- Elevation: 410 m (1,350 ft)

Population (2026-01-01)
  - Total: 335
  - Density: 47.5/km^{2} (123/sq mi)
- Time zone: UTC+1 (CET)
  - Summer (DST): UTC+2 (CEST)
- Postal code: 675 71
- Website: www.ocmanice.cz

Ocmanice is a municipality and village in Třebíč District in the Vysočina Region of the Czech Republic. It has about 300 inhabitants.

Ocmanice lies approximately 18 kilometres (11 mi) east of Třebíč, 43 km (27 mi) south-east of Jihlava, and 156 km (97 mi) south-east of Prague.

== Demographics ==
Historical population
Year	Pop.	±%
1869	338	—
1880	315	−6.8%
1890	334	+6.0%
1900	343	+2.7%
1910	360	+5.0%
1921	393	+9.2%
1930	387	−1.5%
1950	348	−10.1%
1961	382	+9.8%
1970	371	−2.9%
1980	360	−3.0%
1991	318	−11.7%
2001	321	+0.9%
2011	335	+4.4%
2021	317	−5.4%
Source: Censuses
