= Naloučany =

- Municipality
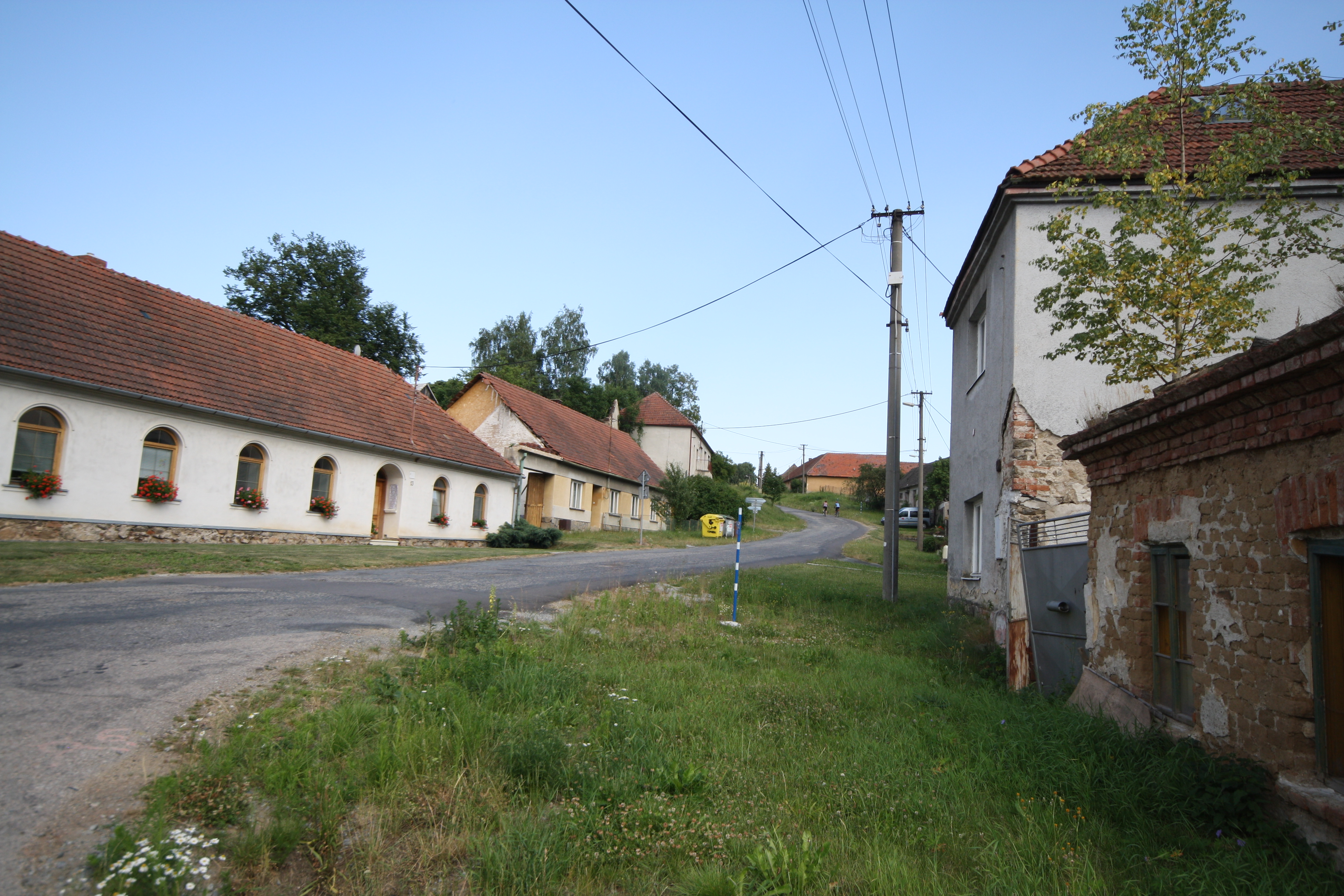
- Centre of Naloučany

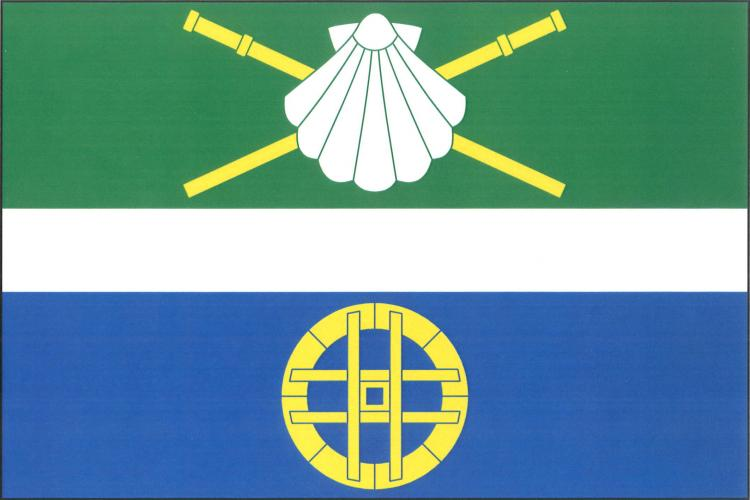
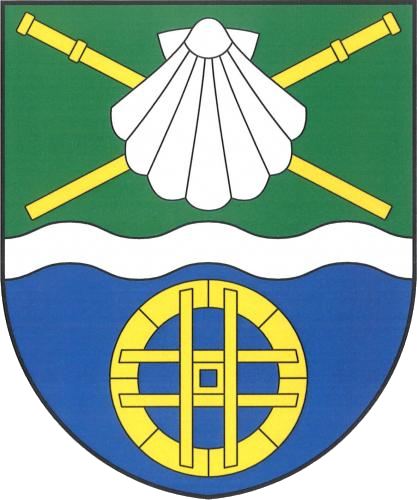
- Flag Coat of arms

- Location in the Czech Republic
- Coordinates: 49°13′59″N 16°8′7″E
- Country: Czech Republic
- Region: Vysočina
- District: Třebíč
- First mentioned: 1238

Area
  - Total: 5.41 km^{2} (2.09 sq mi)
- Elevation: 368 m (1,207 ft)

Population (2026-01-01)
  - Total: 163
  - Density: 30.1/km^{2} (78.0/sq mi)
- Time zone: UTC+1 (CET)
  - Summer (DST): UTC+2 (CEST)
- Postal code: 675 71
- Website: www.naloucany.cz

Naloučany is a municipality and village in Třebíč District in the Vysočina Region of the Czech Republic. It has about 200 inhabitants.

Naloučany lies approximately 19 kilometres (12 mi) east of Třebíč, 44 km (27 mi) south-east of Jihlava, and 156 km (97 mi) south-east of Prague.

== Demographics ==
Historical population
Year	Pop.	±%
1869	357	—
1880	339	−5.0%
1890	352	+3.8%
1900	337	−4.3%
1910	320	−5.0%
1921	346	+8.1%
1930	294	−15.0%
1950	248	−15.6%
1961	240	−3.2%
1970	237	−1.2%
1980	169	−28.7%
1991	134	−20.7%
2001	133	−0.7%
2011	163	+22.6%
2021	164	+0.6%
Source: Censuses
