= Nový Telečkov =

- Municipality
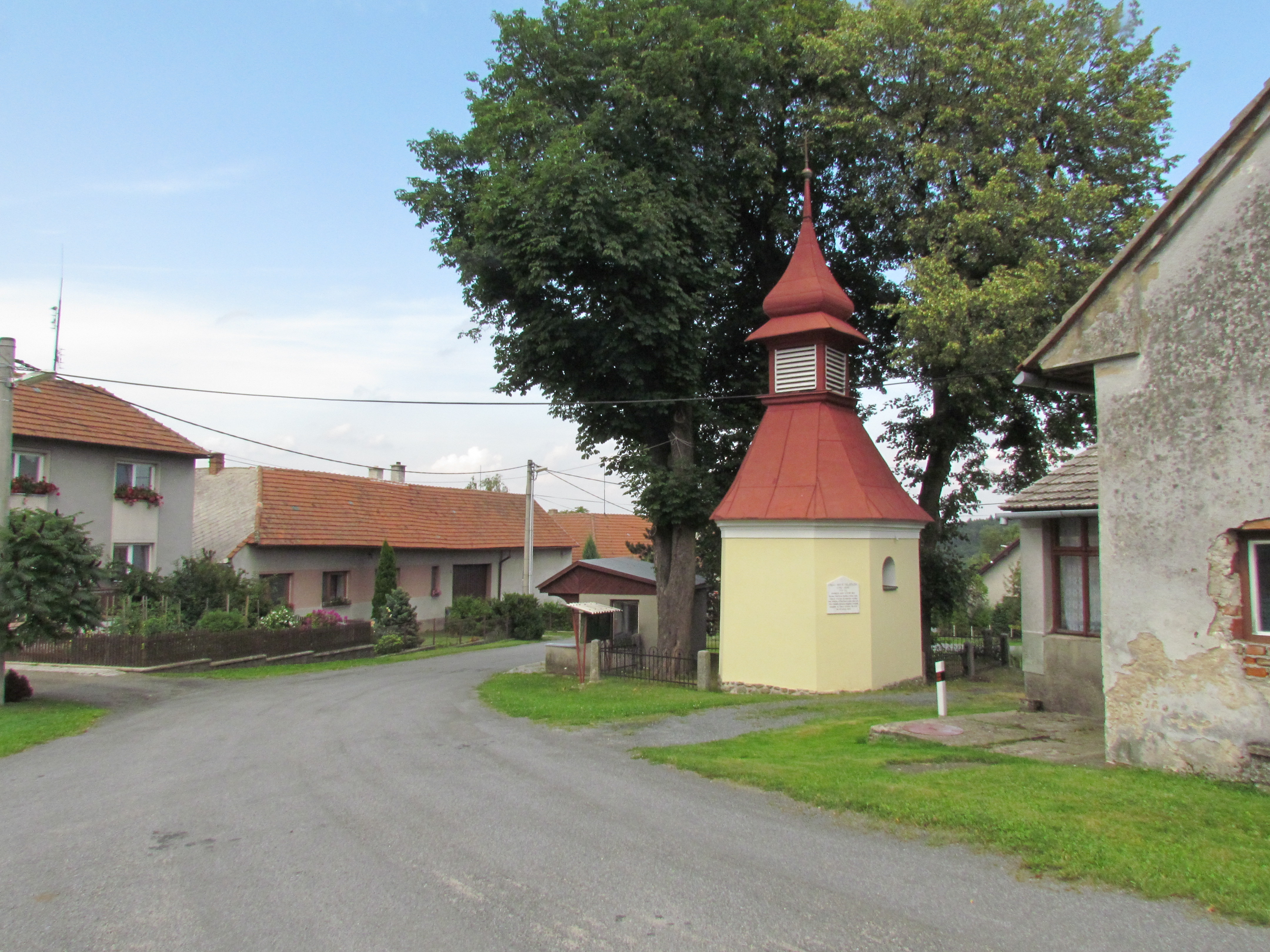
- Centre of Nový Telečkov

- Location in the Czech Republic
- Coordinates: 49°19′16″N 15°56′18″E
- Country: Czech Republic
- Region: Vysočina
- District: Třebíč
- First mentioned: 1236

Area
  - Total: 3.67 km^{2} (1.42 sq mi)
- Elevation: 553 m (1,814 ft)

Population (2026-01-01)
  - Total: 97
  - Density: 26/km^{2} (68/sq mi)
- Time zone: UTC+1 (CET)
  - Summer (DST): UTC+2 (CEST)
- Postal code: 675 05
- Website: www.novyteleckov.cz

Nový Telečkov is a municipality and village in Třebíč District in the Vysočina Region of the Czech Republic. It has about 100 inhabitants.

Nový Telečkov lies approximately 13 kilometres (8 mi) north of Třebíč, 27 km (17 mi) east of Jihlava, and 138 km (86 mi) south-east of Prague.

== Demographics ==
Historical population
Year	Pop.	±%
1869	141	—
1880	135	−4.3%
1890	147	+8.9%
1900	137	−6.8%
1910	142	+3.6%
1921	149	+4.9%
1930	144	−3.4%
1950	143	−0.7%
1961	126	−11.9%
1970	114	−9.5%
1980	113	−0.9%
1991	105	−7.1%
2001	112	+6.7%
2011	106	−5.4%
2021	92	−13.2%
Source: Censuses
