= Valdíkov =

- Municipality
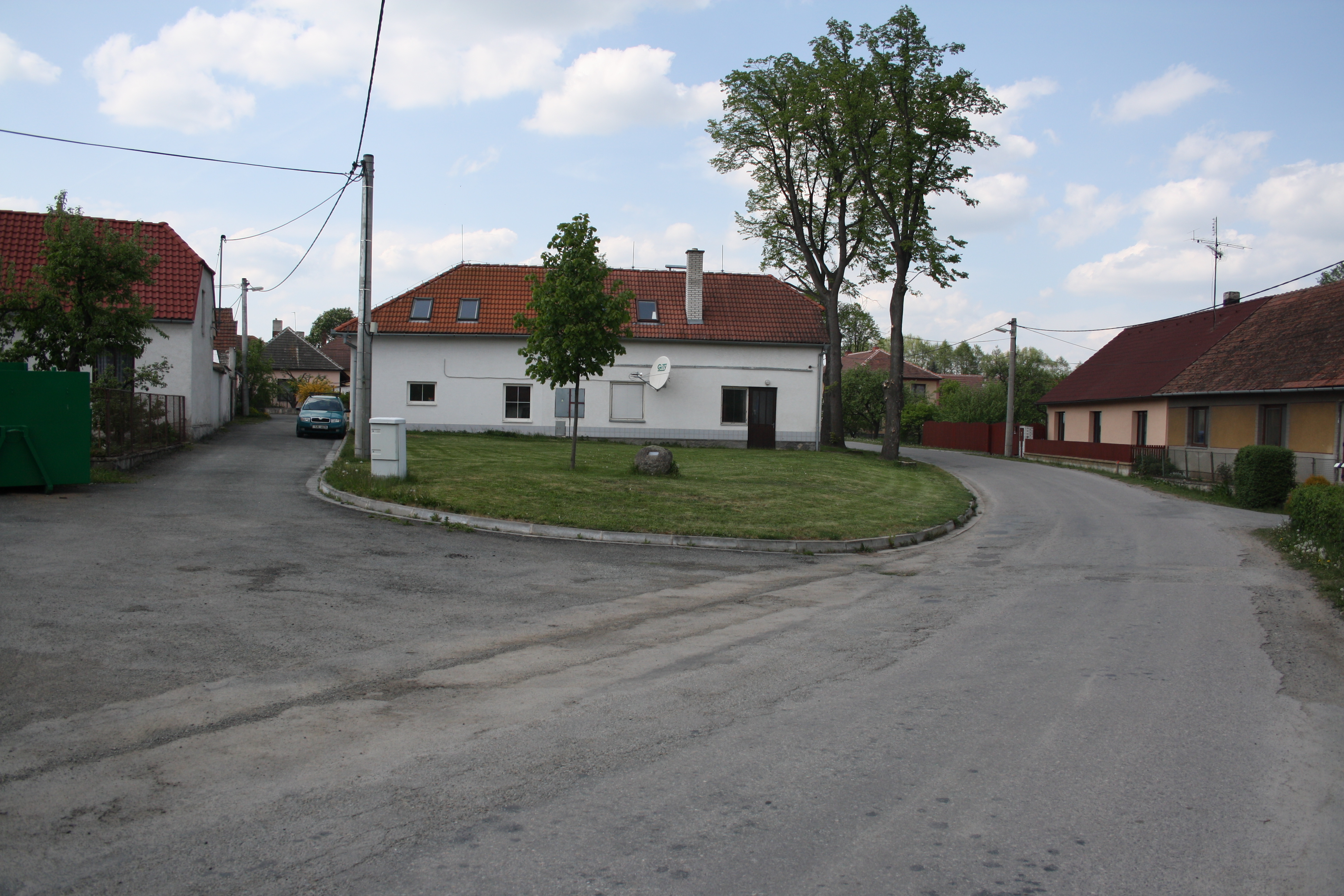
- Centre of Valdíkov

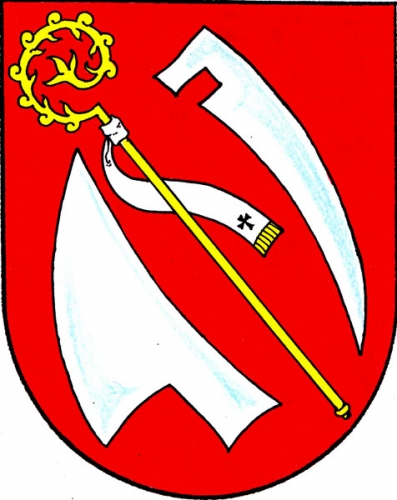
- Flag Coat of arms

- Location in the Czech Republic
- Coordinates: 49°14′49″N 15°59′7″E
- Country: Czech Republic
- Region: Vysočina
- District: Třebíč
- First mentioned: 1101

Area
  - Total: 5.84 km^{2} (2.25 sq mi)
- Elevation: 442 m (1,450 ft)

Population (2026-01-01)
  - Total: 118
  - Density: 20.2/km^{2} (52.3/sq mi)
- Time zone: UTC+1 (CET)
  - Summer (DST): UTC+2 (CEST)
- Postal code: 675 03
- Website: www.valdikov.cz

Valdíkov is a municipality and village in Třebíč District in the Vysočina Region of the Czech Republic. It has about 100 inhabitants.

Valdíkov lies approximately 9 kilometres (6 mi) north-east of Třebíč, 33 km (21 mi) south-east of Jihlava, and 146 km (91 mi) south-east of Prague.

== Demographics ==
Historical population
Year	Pop.	±%
1869	110	—
1880	124	+12.7%
1890	141	+13.7%
1900	152	+7.8%
1910	185	+21.7%
1921	177	−4.3%
1930	167	−5.6%
1950	154	−7.8%
1961	185	+20.1%
1970	107	−42.2%
1980	82	−23.4%
1991	83	+1.2%
2001	102	+22.9%
2011	95	−6.9%
2021	110	+15.8%
Source: Censuses
