= Třebíč District =

Třebíč District Okres Třebíč
- District
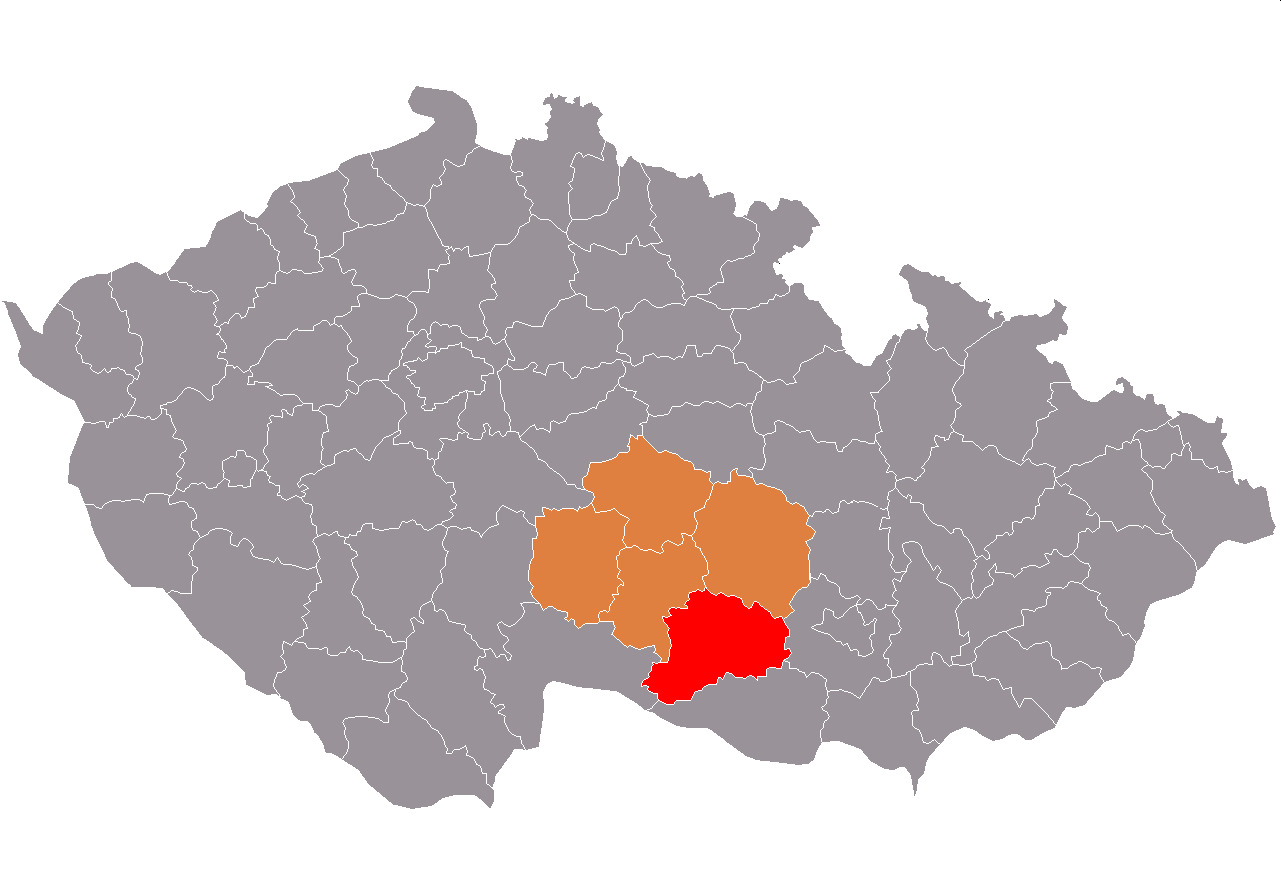
- Location in the Vysočina Region within the Czech Republic
- Coordinates: 49°11′N 15°53′E
- Country: Czech Republic
- Region: Vysočina
- Capital: Třebíč

Area
  - Total: 1,462.79 km^{2} (564.79 sq mi)

Population (2026)
  - Total: 110,200
  - Density: 75.34/km^{2} (195.1/sq mi)
- Time zone: UTC+1 (CET)
  - Summer (DST): UTC+2 (CEST)
- Municipalities: 167
- * Towns: 6
- * Market towns: 10

Třebíč District (Czech: okres Třebíč) is a district in the Vysočina Region of the Czech Republic. Its capital is the town of Třebíč.

== Administrative division ==
Třebíč District is divided into three administrative districts of municipalities with extended competence: Třebíč, Moravské Budějovice and Náměšť nad Oslavou.

=== List of municipalities ===
Towns are marked in bold and market towns in italics:

Babice – Bačice – Bačkovice – Benetice – Biskupice-Pulkov – Blatnice – Bochovice – Bohušice – Bransouze – Březník – Budišov – Budkov – Čáslavice – Častohostice – Čechočovice – Čechtín – Červená Lhota – Chlístov – Chlum – Chotěbudice – Číchov – Cidlina – Číhalín – Čikov – Číměř – Dalešice – Dědice – Dešov – Dolní Lažany – Dolní Vilémovice – Domamil – Dukovany – Hartvíkovice – Heraltice – Hluboké – Hodov – Horní Heřmanice – Horní Smrčné – Horní Újezd – Horní Vilémovice – Hornice – Hrotovice – Hroznatín – Hvězdoňovice – Jakubov u Moravských Budějovic – Jaroměřice nad Rokytnou – Jasenice – Jemnice – Jinošov – Jiratice – Kamenná – Kdousov – Kladeruby nad Oslavou – Klučov – Kojatice – Kojatín – Kojetice – Komárovice – Koněšín – Kostníky – Kouty – Kozlany – Kožichovice – Krahulov – Kralice nad Oslavou – Kramolín – Krhov – Krokočín – Kuroslepy – Láz – Lesná – Lesní Jakubov – Lesonice – Lesůňky – Lhánice – Lhotice – Lipník – Litohoř – Litovany – Lomy – Loukovice – Lovčovice – Lukov – Markvartice – Martínkov – Mastník – Menhartice – Meziříčko – Mikulovice – Mladoňovice – Mohelno – Moravské Budějovice – Myslibořice – Naloučany – Náměšť nad Oslavou – Nárameč – Nimpšov – Nová Ves – Nové Syrovice – Nový Telečkov – Ocmanice – Odunec – Okarec – Okřešice – Okříšky – Opatov – Oponešice – Ostašov – Pálovice – Petrovice – Petrůvky – Pokojovice – Police – Popůvky – Pozďatín – Přeckov – Předín – Přešovice – Přibyslavice – Příštpo – Pucov – Pyšel – Račice – Rácovice – Radkovice u Budče – Radkovice u Hrotovic – Radonín – Radošov – Radotice – Rapotice – Římov – Rohy – Rokytnice nad Rokytnou – Rouchovany – Rudíkov – Šebkovice – Sedlec – Slavětice – Slavičky – Slavíkovice – Smrk – Stařeč – Štěměchy – Štěpkov – Stropešín – Střítež – Studenec – Studnice – Sudice – Svatoslav – Třebelovice – Třebenice – Třebíč – Třesov – Trnava – Valdíkov – Valeč – Vícenice – Vícenice u Náměště nad Oslavou – Vladislav – Vlčatín – Výčapy – Zahrádka – Zárubice – Zašovice – Želetava – Zvěrkovice

== Geography ==
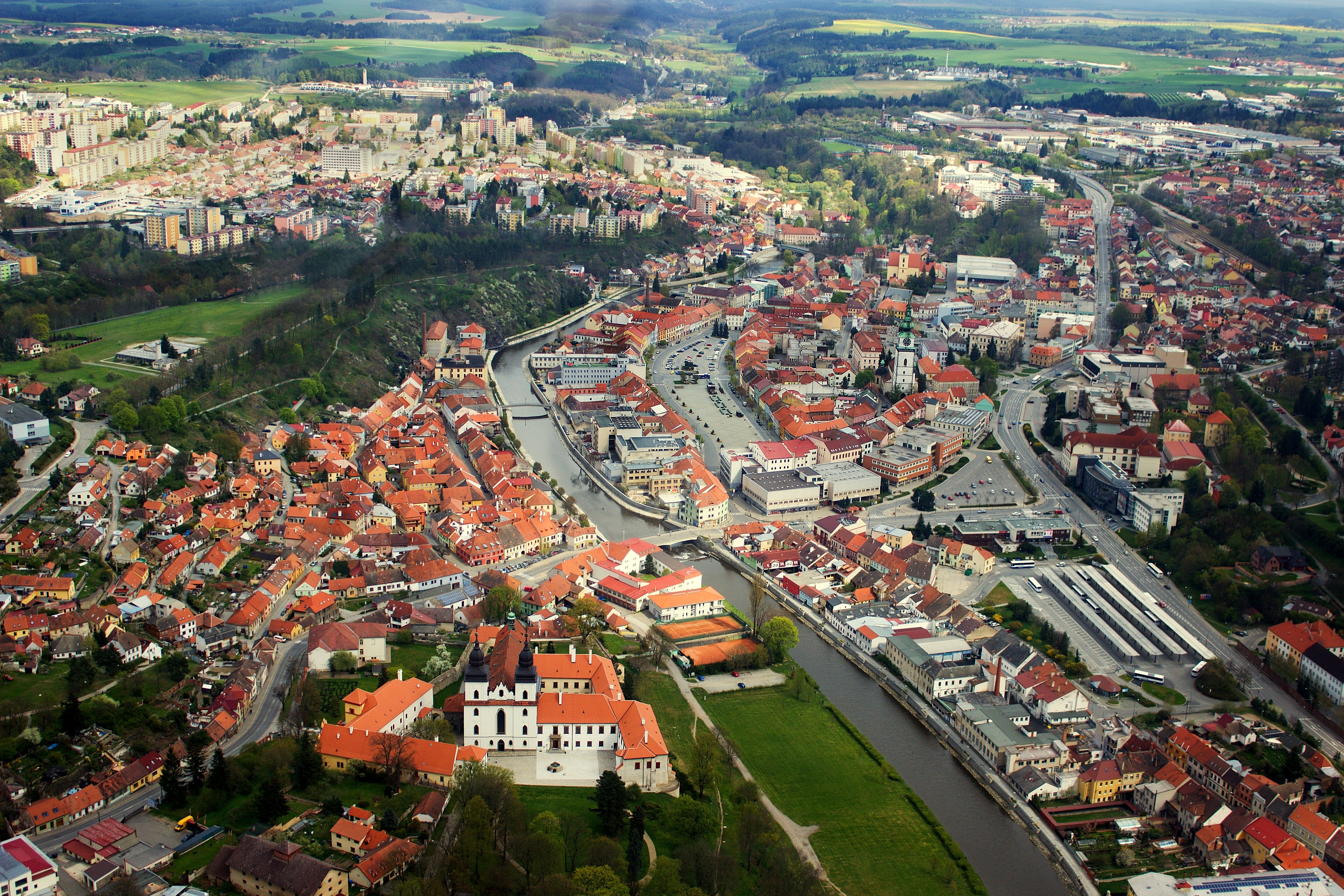
Aerial view of Třebíč

The landscape is rugged and hilly with valleys of several rivers, and is relatively sparsely forested. The territory extends into two geomorphological mesoregions: Jevišovice Uplands (most of the territory) and Křižanov Highlands (north and west). The highest point of the district is the hill Mařenka in Štěměchy with an elevation of 711 m (2,333 ft), the lowest point is the river bed of the Oslava in Lhánice at 239 m (784 ft).

From the total district area of 1,462.8 km^{2} (564.8 sq mi), agricultural land occupies 928.4 km^{2} (358.5 sq mi), forests occupy 396.1 km^{2} (152.9 sq mi), and water area occupies 26.0 km^{2} (10.0 sq mi). Forests cover 27.1% of the district's area.

The most important river is the Jihlava, which flows across the district from northwest to east. Other notable rivers are the Oslava and Rokytná. The largest body of water is the Dalešice Reservoir. There are also many ponds, especially in the northern part of the territory.

There are no protected landscape areas, only small-scale protected areas.

== Demographics ==
Historical population

Year	Pop.	±%
1869	87,050	—
1880	92,156	+5.9%
1890	95,890	+4.1%
1900	100,705	+5.0%
1910	103,395	+2.7%

Year	Pop.	±%
1921	106,292	+2.8%
1930	107,317	+1.0%
1950	99,756	−7.0%
1961	105,333	+5.6%
1970	104,319	−1.0%

Year	Pop.	±%
1980	108,885	+4.4%
1991	114,289	+5.0%
2001	114,636	+0.3%
2011	111,693	−2.6%
2021	107,997	−3.3%

Source: Censuses

=== Most populous municipalities ===
Name	Population	Area (km^{2})
Třebíč	34,476	58
Moravské Budějovice	7,079	37
Náměšť nad Oslavou	4,738	19
Jaroměřice nad Rokytnou	4,044	51
Jemnice	3,979	32
Okříšky	2,007	7
Hrotovice	1,779	21
Stařeč	1,713	15
Želetava	1,476	28
Mohelno	1,383	18

== Economy ==
The largest employers with headquarters in Třebíč District and at least 500 employees are:

Economic entity	Location	Number of employees	Main activity
Třebíč Hospital	Třebíč	1,000–1,499	Health care
Egston System Electronic	Jemnice	500–999	Manufacture of electronic components
Mann+Hummel (CZ)	Nová Ves	500–999	Manufacture of filters
Mann+Hummel Service	Nová Ves	500–999	Research, development and support
Fraenkische CZ	Okříšky	500–999	Manufacture of plastic products
I&C Energo	Třebíč	500–999	Supply for the energy industry
ČEZ Energoservis	Třebíč	500–999	Repair and maintenance in the energy industry
TEDOM	Výčapy	500–999	Manufacture of cogeneration units

A facility of national importance is the Dukovany Nuclear Power Station, one of two nuclear power stations in the country.

== Transport ==
There are no motorways passing through the district. The most important road is the I/38 from Jihlava to Znojmo, part of European route E59.

== Sights ==
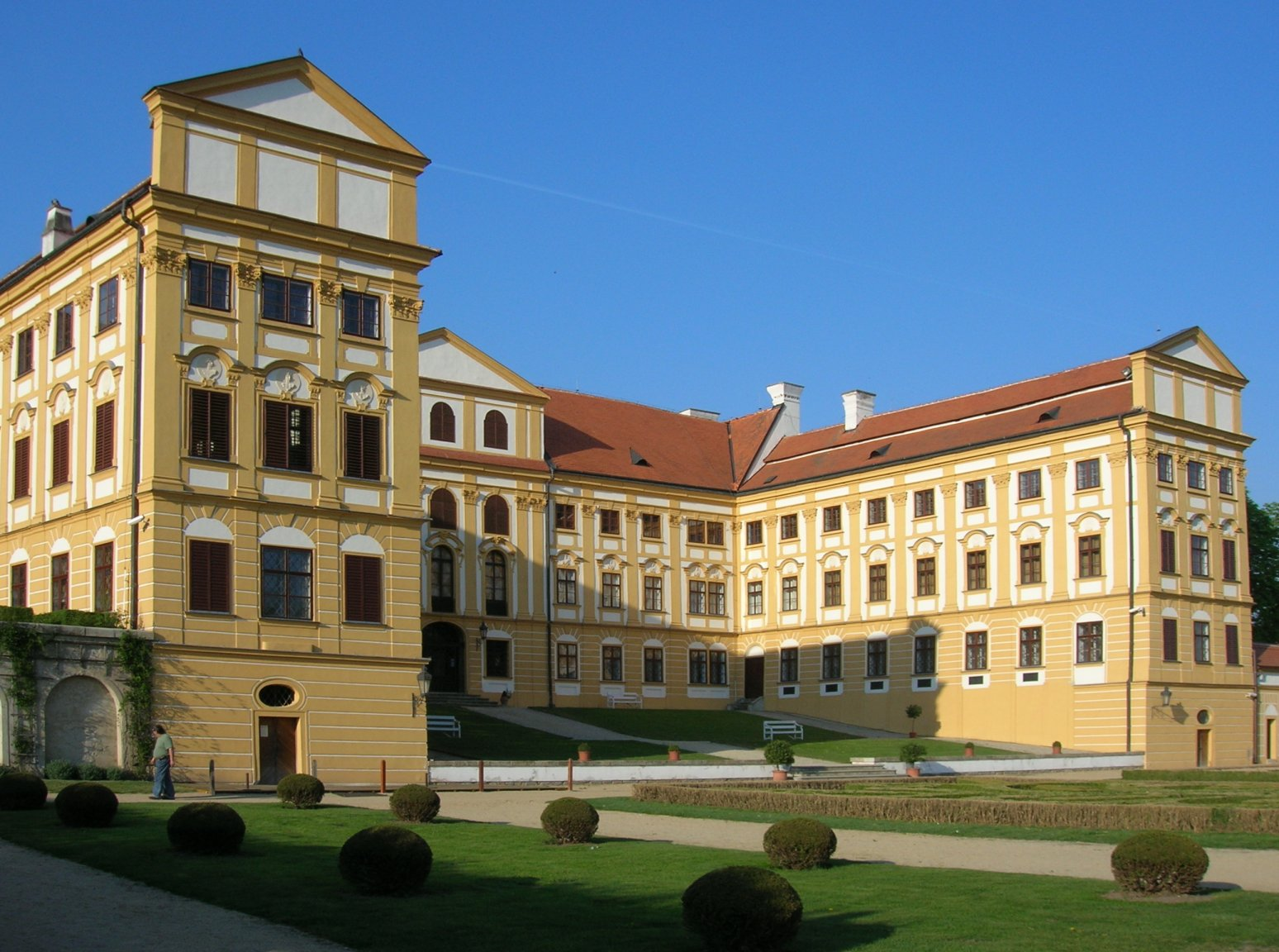
Jaroměřice nad Rokytnou Castle

Jewish Quarter and St Procopius' Basilica in Třebíč was designated a UNESCO World Heritage Site in 2003 as an example of coexistence and interchange between Jewish and Christian cultures.

The most important monuments in the district, protected as national cultural monuments, are:

- Jaroměřice nad Rokytnou Castle with the Church of Saint Margaret
- Náměšť nad Oslavou Castle
- Church of the Assumption of the Virgin Mary in Polná
- Benedictine monastery with the St. Procopius Basilica in Třebíč
- Jewish Cemetery in Třebíč

The best-preserved settlements and landscapes, protected as monument reservations and monument zones, are:

- Dešov (monument reservation)
- Jaroměřice nad Rokytnou
- Jemnice
- Moravské Budějovice
- Náměšť nad Oslavou
- Třebíč
- Boňov
- Landscape around Náměšť nad Oslavou

The most visited tourist destinations are Aquapark Laguna Třebíč, Jaroměřice nad Rokytnou Castle and St. Procopius Basilica in Třebíč.
