= Pokojovice =

- Municipality
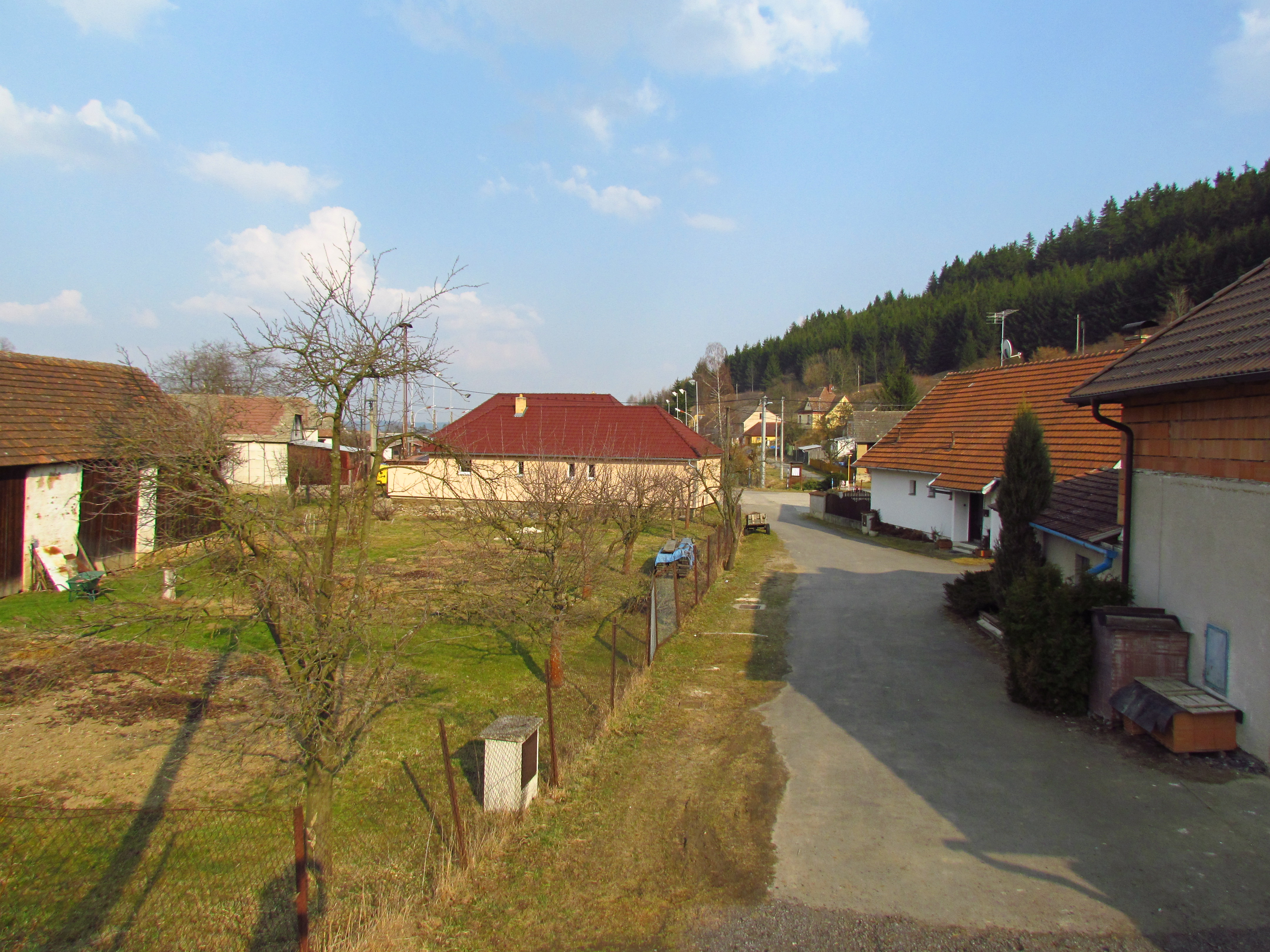
- Centre of Pokojovice

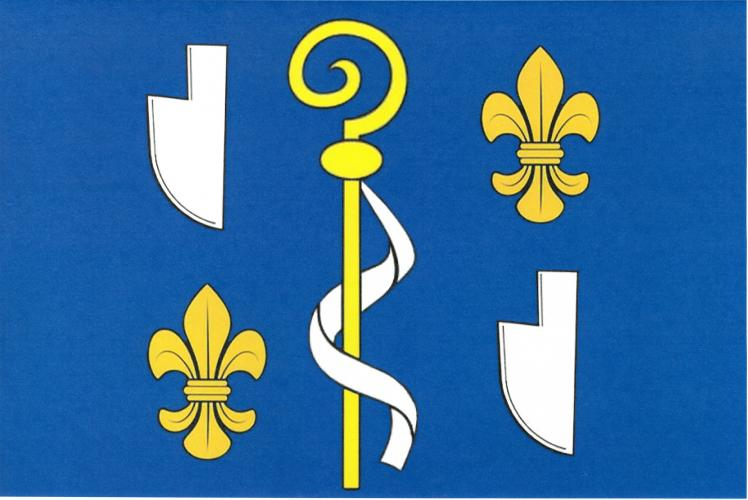
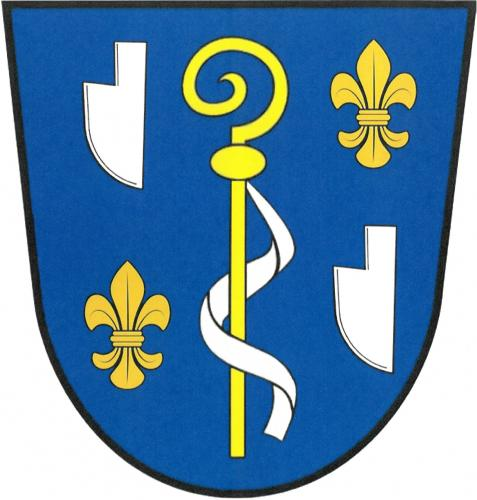
- Flag Coat of arms

- Location in the Czech Republic
- Coordinates: 49°13′11″N 15°44′33″E
- Country: Czech Republic
- Region: Vysočina
- District: Třebíč
- First mentioned: 1090

Area
  - Total: 1.78 km^{2} (0.69 sq mi)
- Elevation: 511 m (1,677 ft)

Population (2026-01-01)
  - Total: 112
  - Density: 62.9/km^{2} (163/sq mi)
- Time zone: UTC+1 (CET)
  - Summer (DST): UTC+2 (CEST)
- Postal code: 675 21
- Website: www.pokojovice.cz

Pokojovice is a municipality and village in Třebíč District in the Vysočina Region of the Czech Republic. It has about 100 inhabitants.

Pokojovice lies approximately 11 kilometres (7 mi) west of Třebíč, 23 km (14 mi) south-east of Jihlava, and 136 km (85 mi) south-east of Prague.

== Demographics ==
Historical population
Year	Pop.	±%
1869	239	—
1880	228	−4.6%
1890	204	−10.5%
1900	229	+12.3%
1910	202	−11.8%
1921	219	+8.4%
1930	193	−11.9%
1950	188	−2.6%
1961	168	−10.6%
1970	152	−9.5%
1980	116	−23.7%
1991	81	−30.2%
2001	85	+4.9%
2011	94	+10.6%
2021	113	+20.2%
Source: Censuses
