= Loukovice =

- Municipality
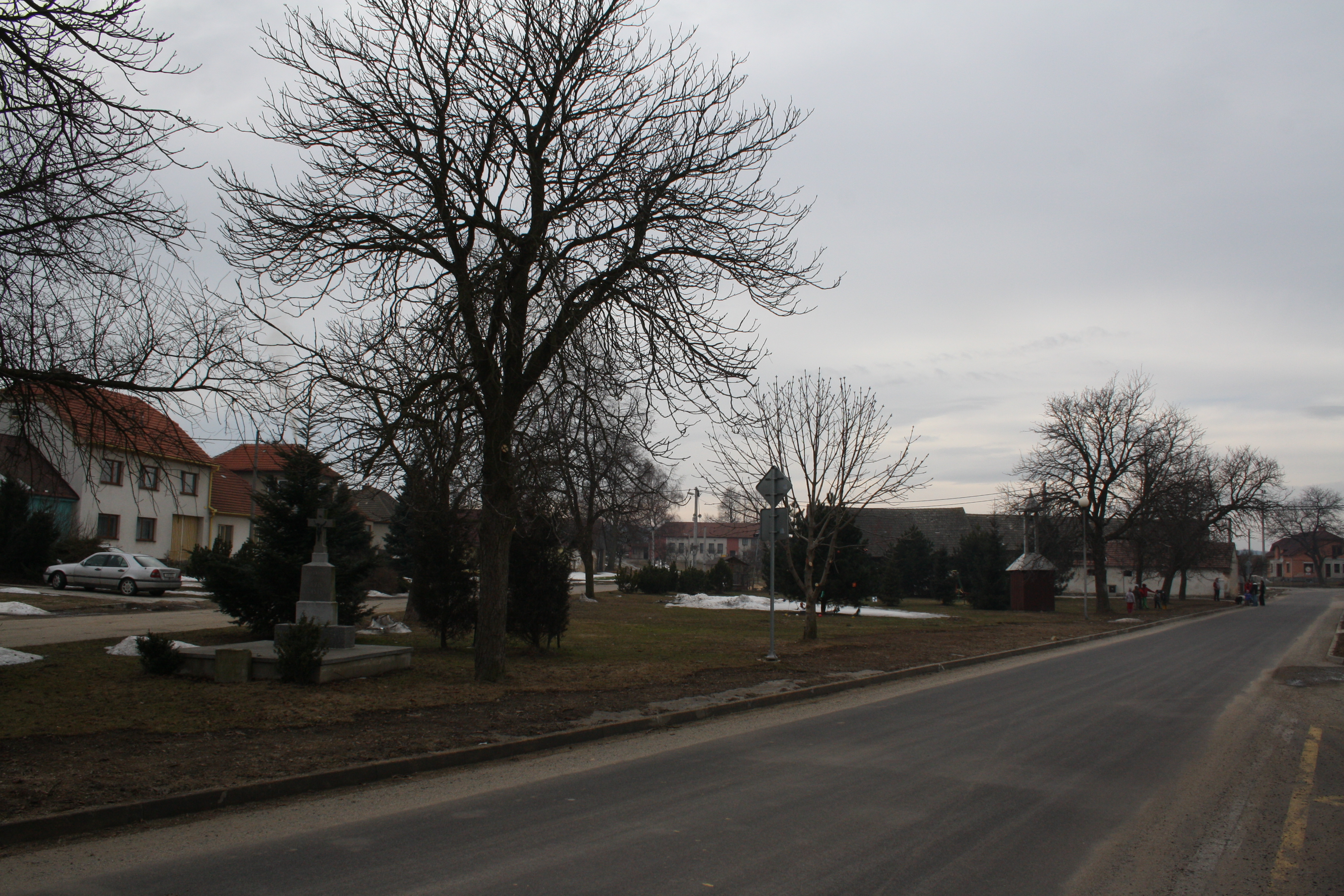
- Centre of Loukovice

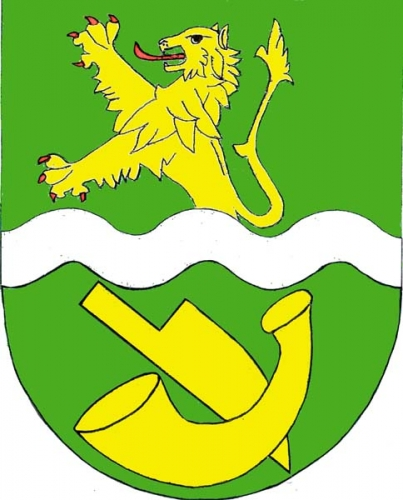
- Flag Coat of arms

- Location in the Czech Republic
- Coordinates: 49°8′14″N 15°47′36″E
- Country: Czech Republic
- Region: Vysočina
- District: Třebíč
- First mentioned: 1349

Area
  - Total: 3.48 km^{2} (1.34 sq mi)
- Elevation: 476 m (1,562 ft)

Population (2026-01-01)
  - Total: 134
  - Density: 38.5/km^{2} (99.7/sq mi)
- Time zone: UTC+1 (CET)
  - Summer (DST): UTC+2 (CEST)
- Postal code: 675 22
- Website: www.loukovice.cz

Loukovice is a municipality and village in Třebíč District in the Vysočina Region of the Czech Republic. It has about 100 inhabitants.

Loukovice lies approximately 12 kilometres (7 mi) south-west of Třebíč, 33 km (21 mi) south-east of Jihlava, and 145 km (90 mi) south-east of Prague.

== Demographics ==
Historical population
Year	Pop.	±%
1869	225	—
1880	256	+13.8%
1890	257	+0.4%
1900	233	−9.3%
1910	243	+4.3%
1921	222	−8.6%
1930	204	−8.1%
1950	178	−12.7%
1961	182	+2.2%
1970	163	−10.4%
1980	153	−6.1%
1991	136	−11.1%
2001	128	−5.9%
2011	109	−14.8%
2021	112	+2.8%
Source: Censuses
