= Zašovice =

- Municipality
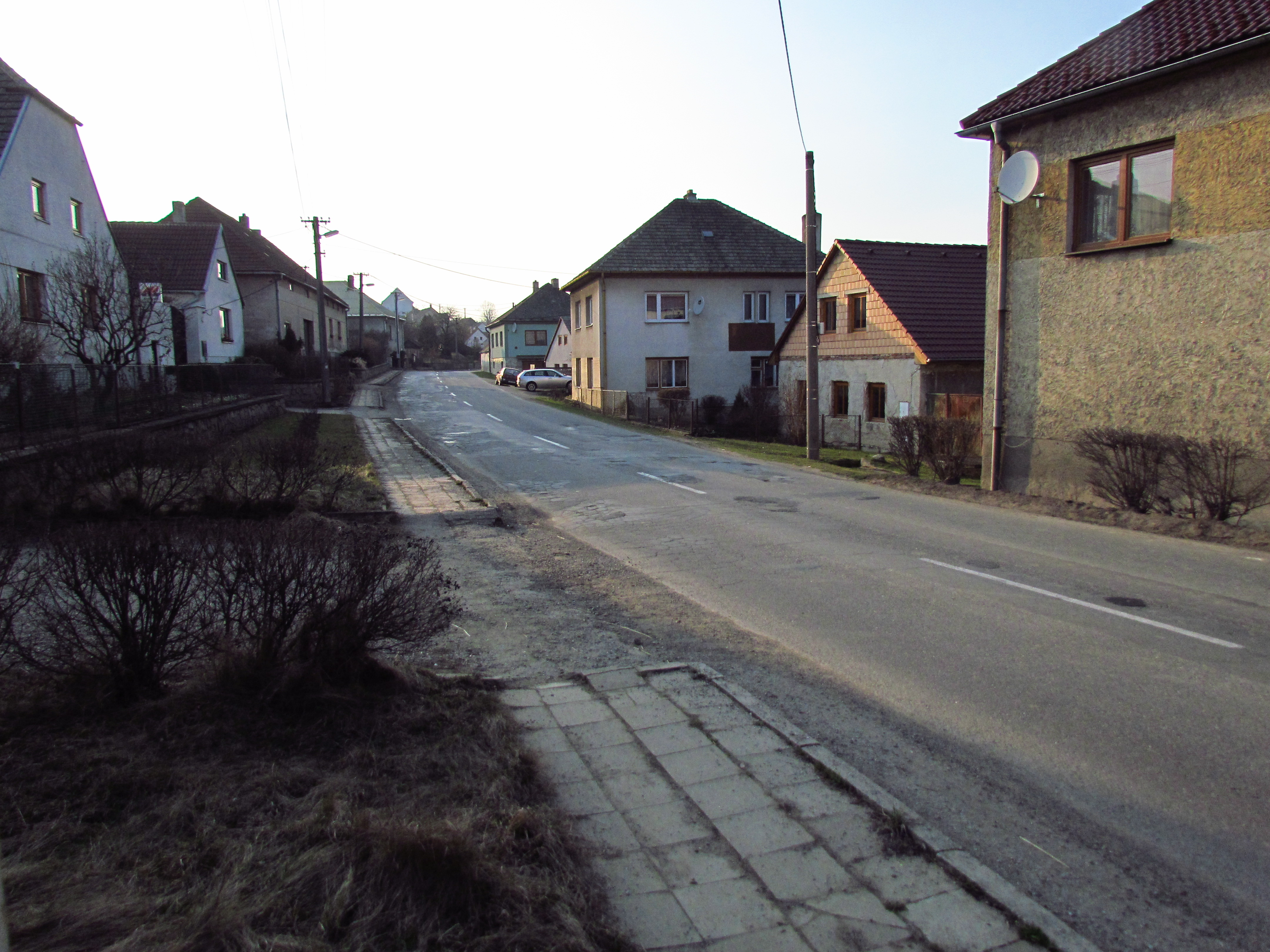
- Centre of Zašovice

- Flag Coat of arms

- Location in the Czech Republic
- Coordinates: 49°15′30″N 15°43′33″E
- Country: Czech Republic
- Region: Vysočina
- District: Třebíč
- First mentioned: 1224

Area
  - Total: 3.40 km^{2} (1.31 sq mi)
- Elevation: 610 m (2,000 ft)

Population (2026-01-01)
  - Total: 132
  - Density: 38.8/km^{2} (101/sq mi)
- Time zone: UTC+1 (CET)
  - Summer (DST): UTC+2 (CEST)
- Postal code: 675 21
- Website: www.zasovice.cz

Zašovice is a municipality and village in Třebíč District in the Vysočina Region of the Czech Republic. It has about 100 inhabitants.

Zašovice lies approximately 14 kilometres (9 mi) north-west of Třebíč, 17 km (11 mi) south-east of Jihlava, and 130 km (81 mi) south-east of Prague.

== Administrative division ==
Zašovice consists of two municipal parts (in brackets population according to the 2021 census):

- Zašovice (93)
- Nová Brtnice (21)

== Demographics ==
Historical population
Year	Pop.	±%
1869	272	—
1880	284	+4.4%
1890	284	+0.0%
1900	275	−3.2%
1910	266	−3.3%
1921	266	+0.0%
1930	275	+3.4%
1950	232	−15.6%
1961	255	+9.9%
1970	219	−14.1%
1980	182	−16.9%
1991	144	−20.9%
2001	127	−11.8%
2011	120	−5.5%
2021	114	−5.0%
Source: Censuses
