= Petrůvky =

- Municipality
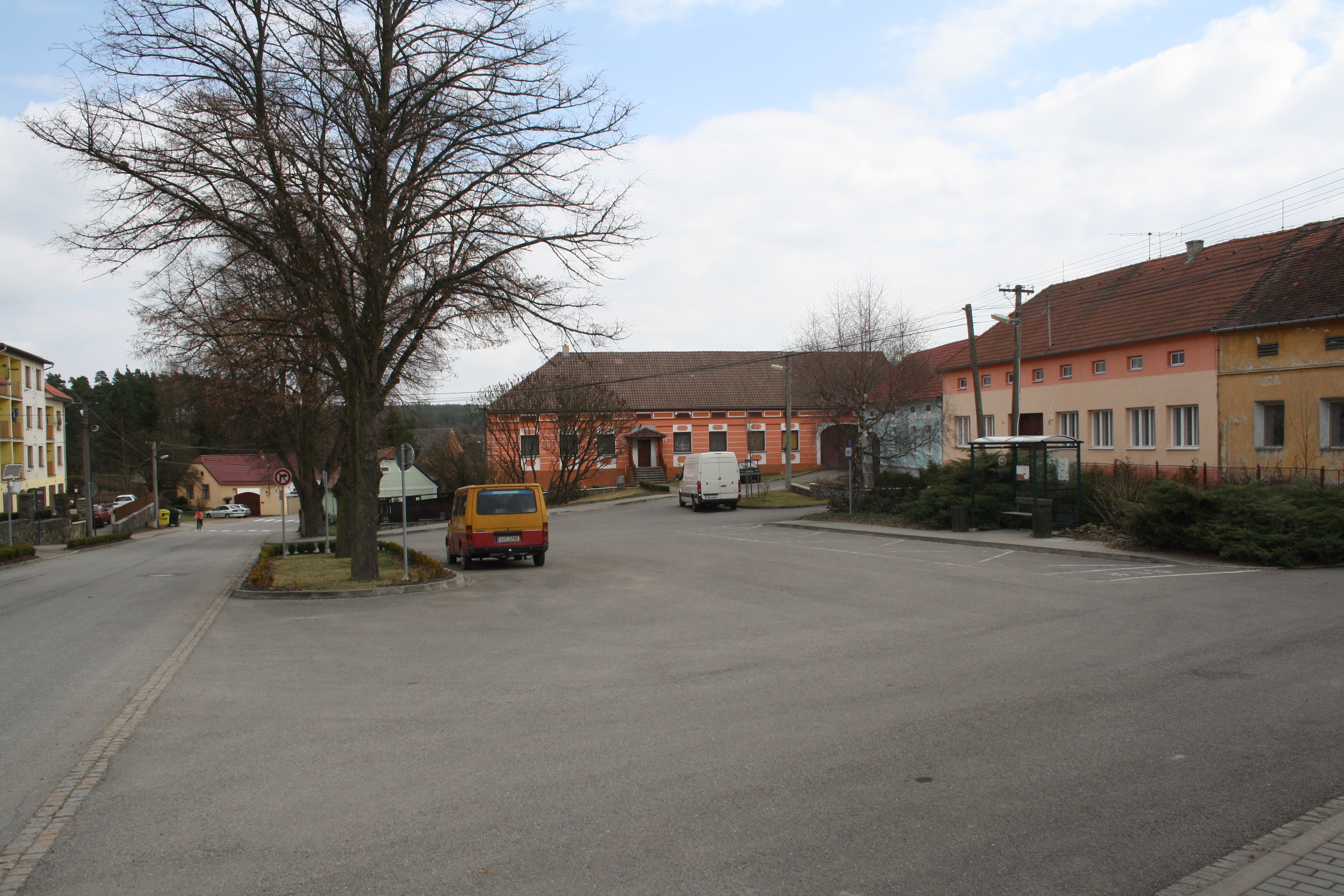
- Centre of Petrůvky

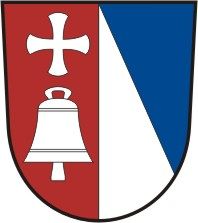
- Flag Coat of arms

- Location in the Czech Republic
- Coordinates: 49°9′33″N 15°54′8″E
- Country: Czech Republic
- Region: Vysočina
- District: Třebíč
- First mentioned: 1519

Area
  - Total: 3.87 km^{2} (1.49 sq mi)
- Elevation: 503 m (1,650 ft)

Population (2026-01-01)
  - Total: 144
  - Density: 37.2/km^{2} (96.4/sq mi)
- Time zone: UTC+1 (CET)
  - Summer (DST): UTC+2 (CEST)
- Postal code: 675 52
- Website: www.petruvky.cz

Petrůvky is a municipality and village in Třebíč District in the Vysočina Region of the Czech Republic. It has about 100 inhabitants.

Petrůvky lies approximately 7 kilometres (4 mi) south of Třebíč, 35 km (22 mi) south-east of Jihlava, and 149 km (93 mi) south-east of Prague.

== Demographics ==
Historical population
Year	Pop.	±%
1869	196	—
1880	187	−4.6%
1890	187	+0.0%
1900	185	−1.1%
1910	179	−3.2%
1921	181	+1.1%
1930	168	−7.2%
1950	123	−26.8%
1961	146	+18.7%
1970	126	−13.7%
1980	110	−12.7%
1991	103	−6.4%
2001	87	−15.5%
2011	86	−1.1%
2021	126	+46.5%
Source: Censuses
