= Krokočín =

- Municipality
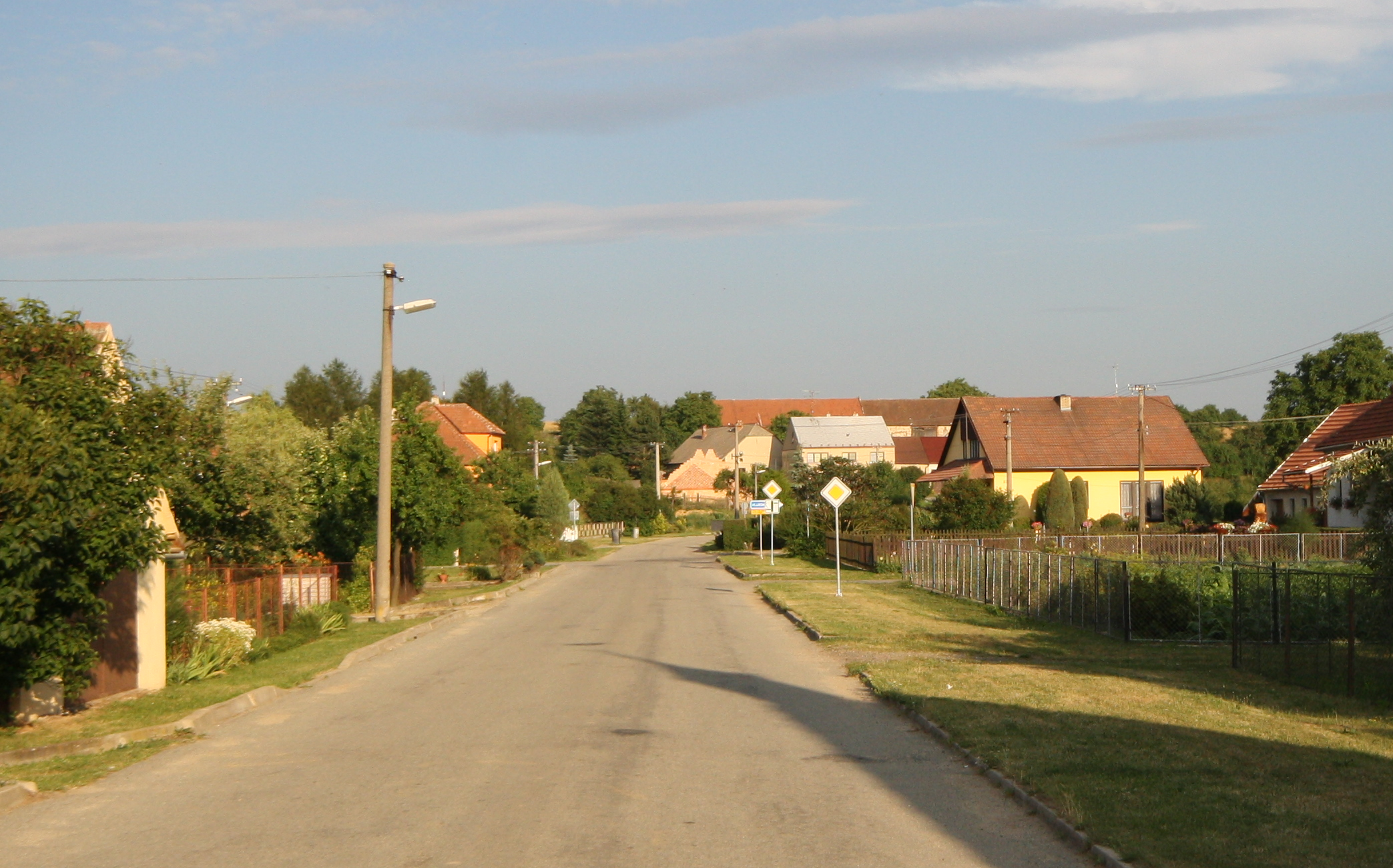
- Centre of Krokočín

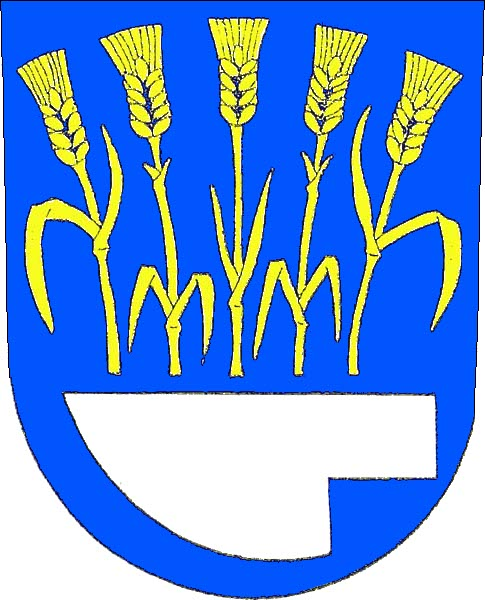
- Flag Coat of arms

- Location in the Czech Republic
- Coordinates: 49°14′39″N 16°13′59″E
- Country: Czech Republic
- Region: Vysočina
- District: Třebíč
- First mentioned: 1350

Area
  - Total: 4.32 km^{2} (1.67 sq mi)
- Elevation: 472 m (1,549 ft)

Population (2026-01-01)
  - Total: 201
  - Density: 46.5/km^{2} (121/sq mi)
- Time zone: UTC+1 (CET)
  - Summer (DST): UTC+2 (CEST)
- Postal code: 675 71
- Website: www.krokocin.cz

Krokočín is a municipality and village in Třebíč District in the Vysočina Region of the Czech Republic. It has about 200 inhabitants.

Krokočín lies approximately 26 kilometres (16 mi) east of Třebíč, 50 km (31 mi) east of Jihlava, and 161 km (100 mi) south-east of Prague.

== Demographics ==
Historical population
Year	Pop.	±%
1869	264	—
1880	276	+4.5%
1890	273	−1.1%
1900	321	+17.6%
1910	299	−6.9%
1921	284	−5.0%
1930	311	+9.5%
1950	254	−18.3%
1961	271	+6.7%
1970	265	−2.2%
1980	229	−13.6%
1991	202	−11.8%
2001	217	+7.4%
2011	191	−12.0%
2021	219	+14.7%
Source: Censuses
