= Okřešice =

- Municipality
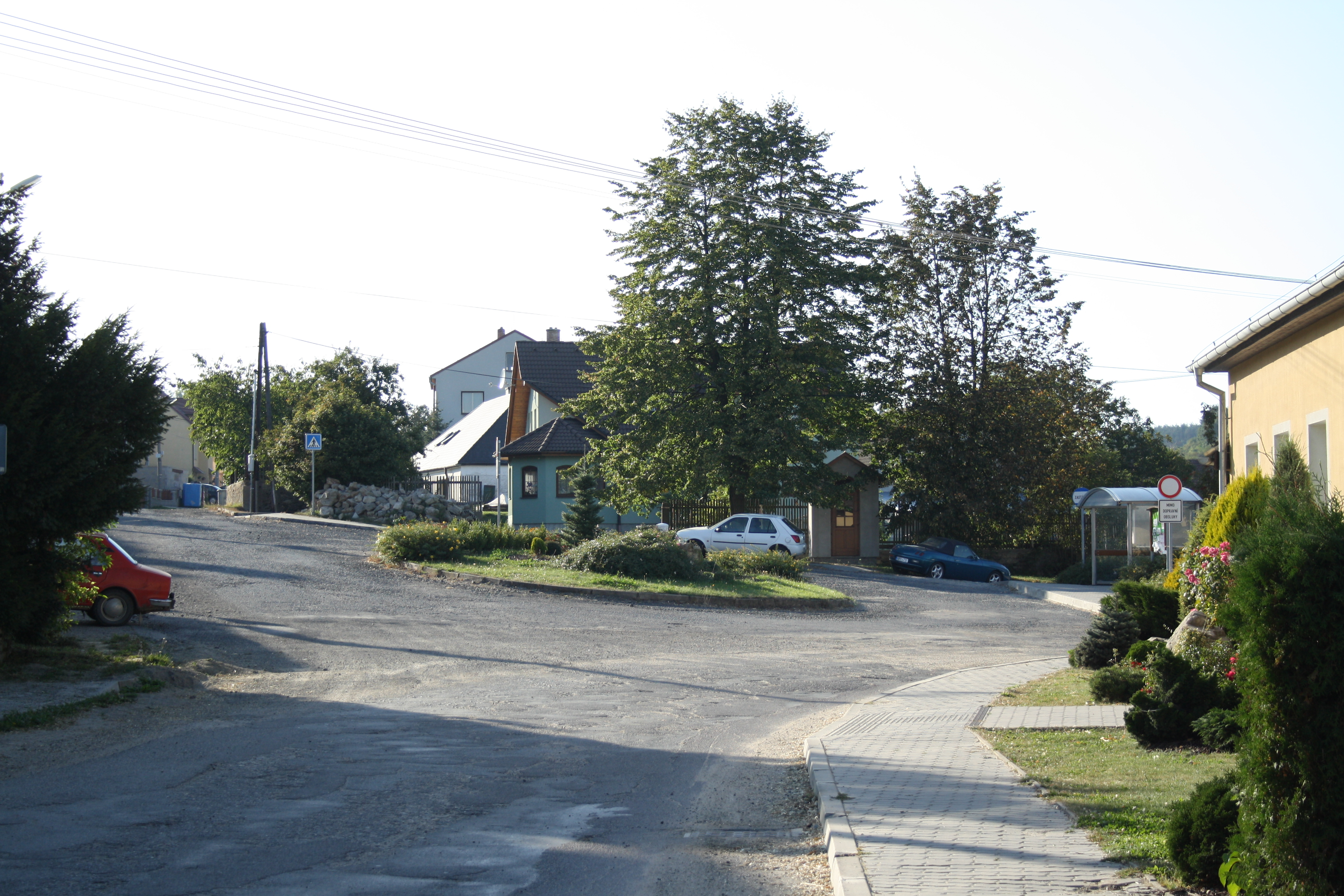
- Centre of Okřešice

- Flag Coat of arms

- Location in the Czech Republic
- Coordinates: 49°15′34″N 15°51′7″E
- Country: Czech Republic
- Region: Vysočina
- District: Třebíč
- First mentioned: 1556

Area
  - Total: 5.82 km^{2} (2.25 sq mi)
- Elevation: 512 m (1,680 ft)

Population (2026-01-01)
  - Total: 195
  - Density: 33.5/km^{2} (86.8/sq mi)
- Time zone: UTC+1 (CET)
  - Summer (DST): UTC+2 (CEST)
- Postal code: 674 01
- Website: www.obec-okresice.cz

Okřešice is a municipality and village in Třebíč District in the Vysočina Region of the Czech Republic. It has about 200 inhabitants.

Okřešice lies approximately 5 kilometres (3 mi) north-west of Třebíč, 25 km (16 mi) south-east of Jihlava, and 139 km (86 mi) south-east of Prague.

== Demographics ==
Historical population
Year	Pop.	±%
1869	178	—
1880	230	+29.2%
1890	240	+4.3%
1900	237	−1.2%
1910	229	−3.4%
1921	263	+14.8%
1930	230	−12.5%
1950	182	−20.9%
1961	176	−3.3%
1970	156	−11.4%
1980	169	+8.3%
1991	164	−3.0%
2001	162	−1.2%
2011	176	+8.6%
2021	189	+7.4%
Source: Censuses
