= Hodov =

- Municipality
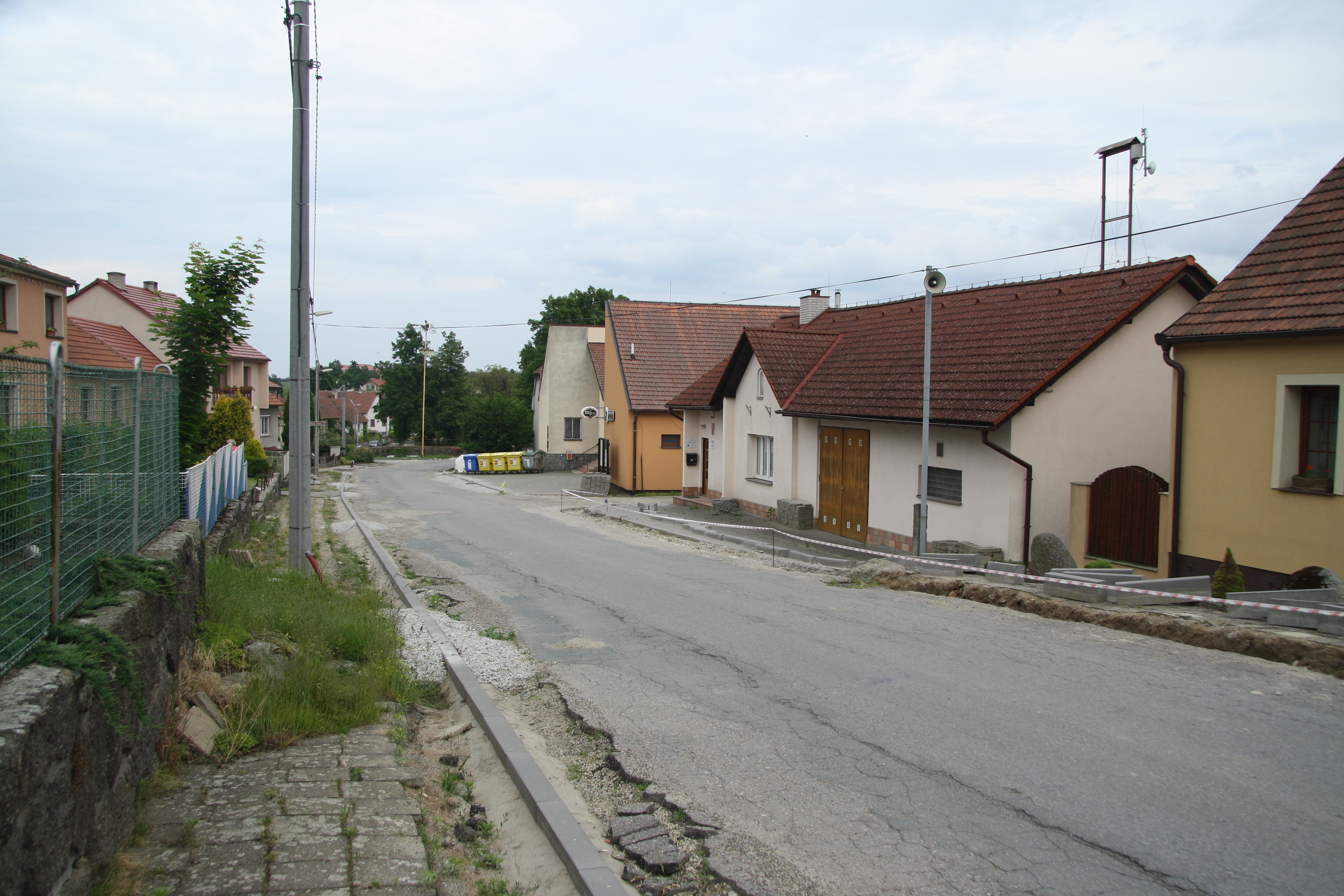
- Centre of Hodov

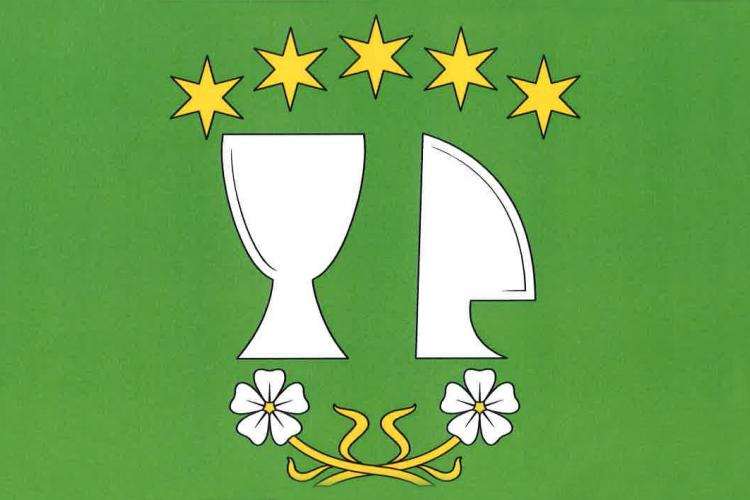
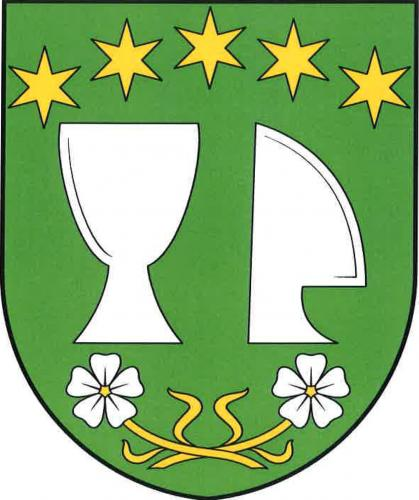
- Flag Coat of arms

- Location in the Czech Republic
- Coordinates: 49°17′38″N 15°59′2″E
- Country: Czech Republic
- Region: Vysočina
- District: Třebíč
- First mentioned: 1349

Area
  - Total: 10.22 km^{2} (3.95 sq mi)
- Elevation: 500 m (1,600 ft)

Population (2026-01-01)
  - Total: 313
  - Density: 30.6/km^{2} (79.3/sq mi)
- Time zone: UTC+1 (CET)
  - Summer (DST): UTC+2 (CEST)
- Postal code: 675 04
- Website: www.hodov.cz

Hodov is a municipality and village in Třebíč District in the Vysočina Region of the Czech Republic. It has about 300 inhabitants.

Hodov lies approximately 12 kilometres (7 mi) north-east of Třebíč, 31 km (19 mi) east of Jihlava, and 143 km (89 mi) south-east of Prague.

== Demographics ==
Historical population
Year	Pop.	±%
1869	475	—
1880	508	+6.9%
1890	533	+4.9%
1900	520	−2.4%
1910	529	+1.7%
1921	535	+1.1%
1930	511	−4.5%
1950	389	−23.9%
1961	407	+4.6%
1970	380	−6.6%
1980	359	−5.5%
1991	323	−10.0%
2001	306	−5.3%
2011	280	−8.5%
2021	301	+7.5%
Source: Censuses
