= Cidlina (Třebíč District) =

- Municipality
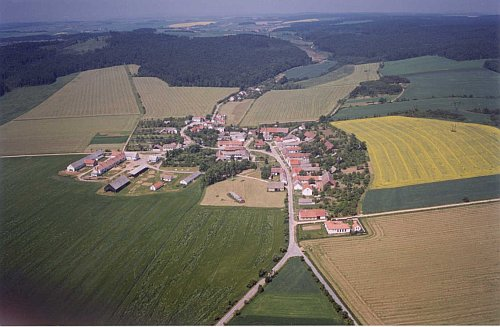
- Aerial view

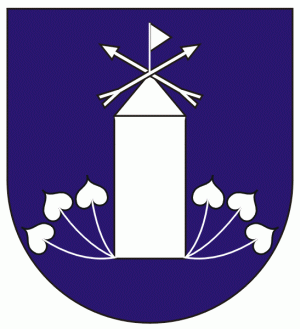
- Flag Coat of arms

- Location in the Czech Republic
- Coordinates: 49°7′42″N 15°44′8″E
- Country: Czech Republic
- Region: Vysočina
- District: Třebíč
- First mentioned: 1200

Area
  - Total: 8.74 km^{2} (3.37 sq mi)
- Elevation: 548 m (1,798 ft)

Population (2026-01-01)
  - Total: 97
  - Density: 11/km^{2} (29/sq mi)
- Time zone: UTC+1 (CET)
  - Summer (DST): UTC+2 (CEST)
- Postal code: 675 44
- Website: www.obec-cidlina.cz

Cidlina is a municipality and village in Třebíč District in the Vysočina Region of the Czech Republic. It has about 100 inhabitants.

Cidlina lies approximately 15 kilometres (9 mi) south-west of Třebíč, 32 km (20 mi) south of Jihlava, and 143 km (89 mi) south-east of Prague.

== Demographics ==
Historical population
Year	Pop.	±%
1869	218	—
1880	233	+6.9%
1890	258	+10.7%
1900	236	−8.5%
1910	227	−3.8%
1921	225	−0.9%
1930	215	−4.4%
1950	186	−13.5%
1961	188	+1.1%
1970	157	−16.5%
1980	155	−1.3%
1991	126	−18.7%
2001	117	−7.1%
2011	90	−23.1%
2021	84	−6.7%
Source: Censuses
