= Štěměchy =

- Municipality
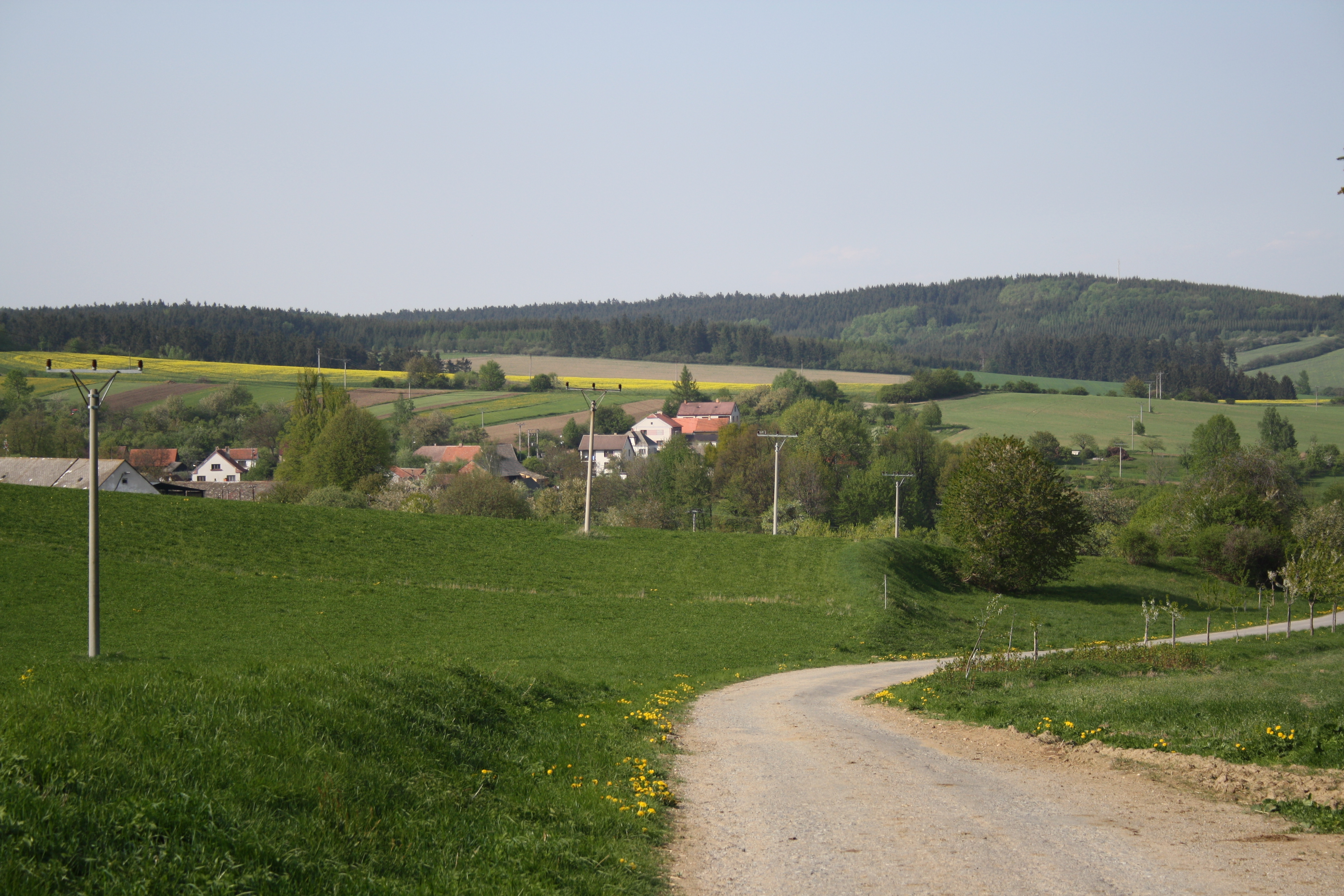
- View from the south

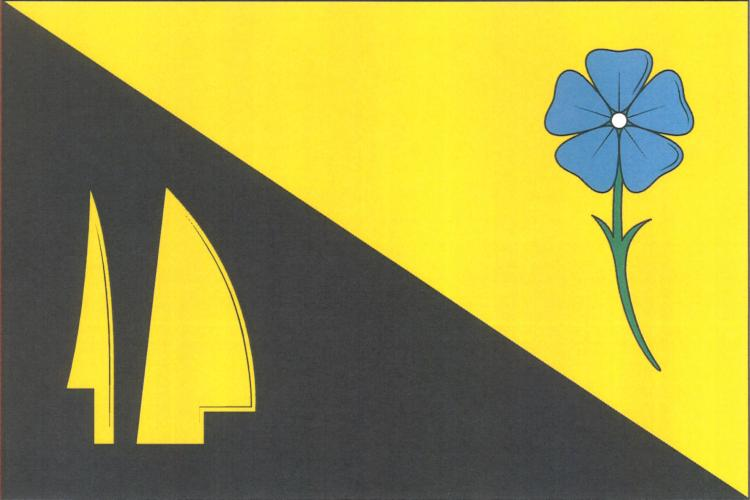
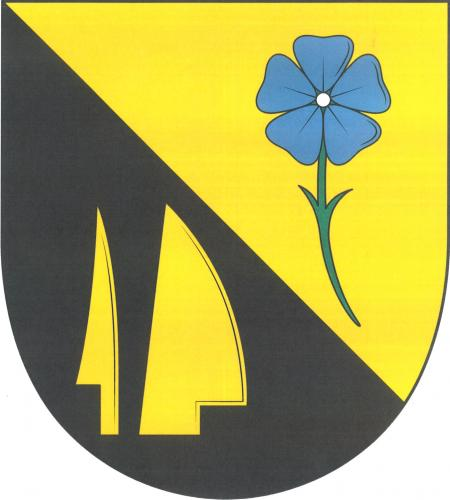
- Flag Coat of arms

- Location in the Czech Republic
- Coordinates: 49°11′36″N 15°42′53″E
- Country: Czech Republic
- Region: Vysočina
- District: Třebíč
- First mentioned: 1279

Area
  - Total: 9.96 km^{2} (3.85 sq mi)
- Elevation: 621 m (2,037 ft)

Population (2026-01-01)
  - Total: 306
  - Density: 30.7/km^{2} (79.6/sq mi)
- Time zone: UTC+1 (CET)
  - Summer (DST): UTC+2 (CEST)
- Postal code: 675 27
- Website: www.stemechy.cz

Štěměchy is a municipality and village in Třebíč District in the Vysočina Region of the Czech Republic. It has about 300 inhabitants.

Štěměchy lies approximately 13 kilometres (8 mi) west of Třebíč, 26 km (16 mi) south of Jihlava, and 137 km (85 mi) south-east of Prague.

== Demographics ==
Historical population
Year	Pop.	±%
1869	486	—
1880	525	+8.0%
1890	533	+1.5%
1900	502	−5.8%
1910	546	+8.8%
1921	536	−1.8%
1930	518	−3.4%
1950	462	−10.8%
1961	486	+5.2%
1970	436	−10.3%
1980	379	−13.1%
1991	319	−15.8%
2001	323	+1.3%
2011	305	−5.6%
2021	289	−5.2%
Source: Censuses
