= Střítež =

Střítež may refer to places in the Czech Republic:

- Střítež (Český Krumlov District), a municipality and village in the South Bohemian Region
- Střítež (Frýdek-Místek District), a municipality and village in the Moravian-Silesian Region
- Střítež (Jihlava District), a municipality and village in the Vysočina Region
- Střítež (Pelhřimov District), a municipality and village in the Vysočina Region
- Střítež (Třebíč District), a municipality and village in the Vysočina Region
- Střítež (Žďár nad Sázavou District), a municipality and village in the Vysočina Region
- Střítež, a village and part of Černovice (Pelhřimov District) in the South Bohemian Region
- Střítež, a village and part of Dolní Kralovice in the Central Bohemian Region
- Střítež, a village and part of Hluboká (Chrudim District) in the Pardubice Region
- Střítež, a village and part of Kolinec in the Plzeň Region
- Střítež, a village and part of Litochovice in the South Bohemian Region
- Střítež, a village and part of Polička in the Pardubice Region
- Střítež, a village and part of Trutnov in the Hradec Králové Region
- Střítež, a village and part of Včelákov in the Pardubice Region
- Střítež, a village and part of Vlksice in the South Bohemian Region
- Střítež nad Bečvou, a municipality and village in the Zlín Region
- Střítež nad Ludinou, a municipality and village in the Olomouc Region
- Střítež pod Křemešníkem, a municipality and village in the Vysočina Region
- Zadní Střítež, a municipality and village in the South Bohemian Region
