= Hlava =

Hlava is a Czech surname (meaning "head"). Its feminine form is Hlavová. Notable people with the surname include:

- Fred Hlava (born 1944), American politician from Nebraska
- Jakub Hlava (born 1979), Czech ski jumper
- Jaroslav Hlava (1855–1924), Czech pathologist
- Lukáš Hlava, Czech ski jumper, brother of Jakub
