= LeRoy Louden =

American politician

Member of the Nebraska Legislature from the 49th district
- In office 2003–2012
- Preceded by: Fred Hlava
- Succeeded by: John Murante

Personal details
- Born: October 12, 1936 (age 90) Alliance, Nebraska, U.S.
- Party: Republican

LeRoy J. Louden (born October 12, 1936) is an American politician and former state senator in the unicameral Nebraska Legislature. He is also a rancher.

== Personal life ==
Born in 1936 in Alliance, Nebraska, LeRoy Louden is a graduate of St. Agnes Academy and Nebraska State Trade School. He was married in 1999 and has six children. He is a member of the Nebraska Cattlemen, Elks Club, Fraternal Order of Eagles, and a former secretary of the Dist #119 school board.

== State legislature ==
He was elected in 2002 to represent the 49th Nebraska legislative district. He was reelected in 2004 and 2008.
