= Střítež (Žďár nad Sázavou District) =

- Municipality
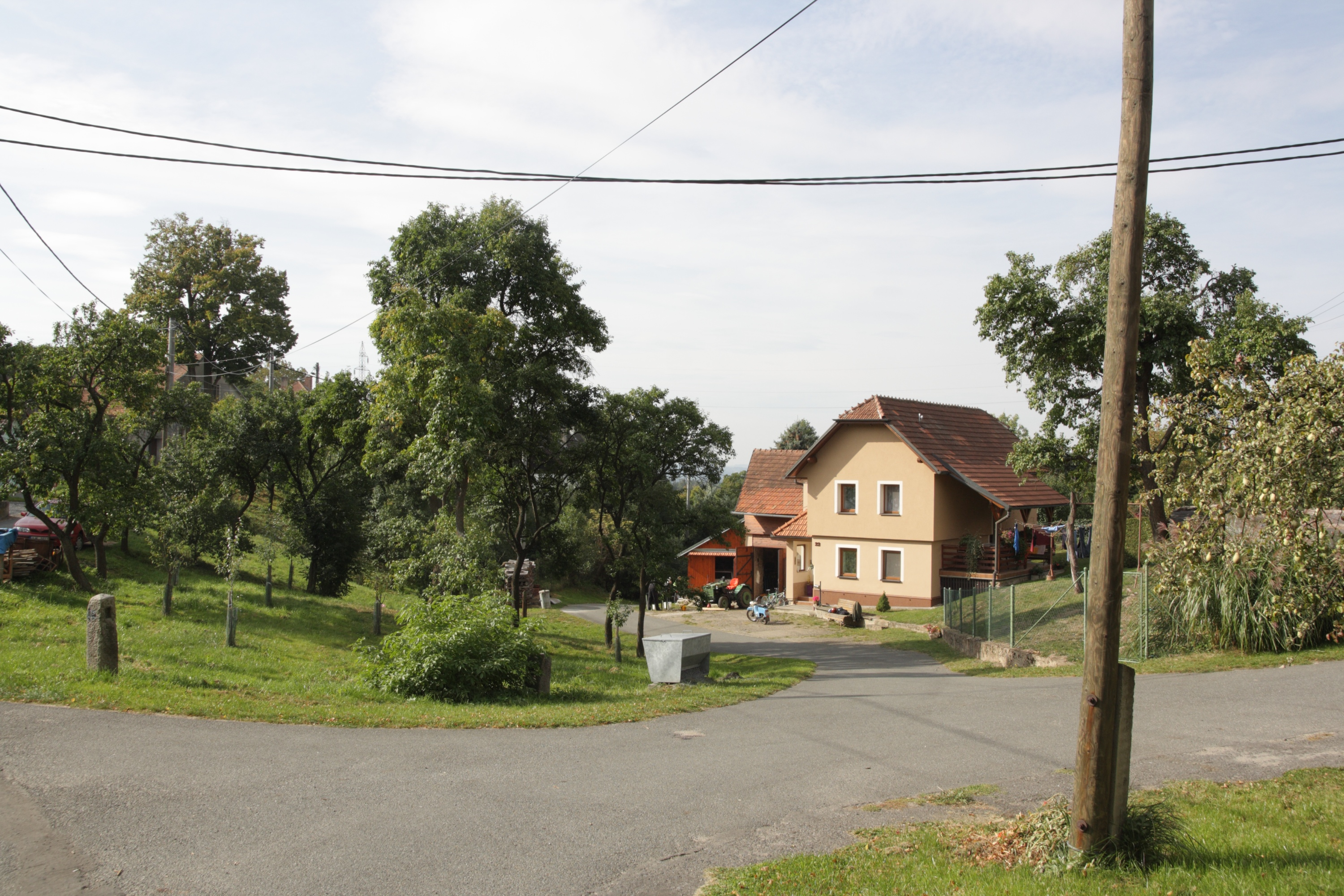
- Centre of Střítež

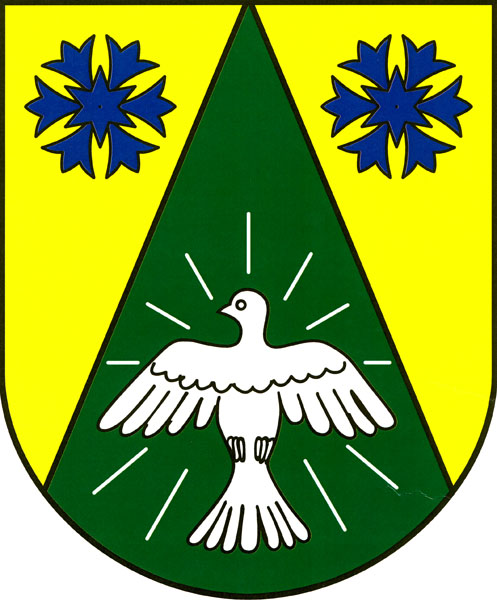
- Flag Coat of arms

- Location in the Czech Republic
- Coordinates: 49°26′26″N 16°15′24″E
- Country: Czech Republic
- Region: Vysočina
- District: Žďár nad Sázavou
- First mentioned: 1356

Area
  - Total: 5.81 km^{2} (2.24 sq mi)
- Elevation: 563 m (1,847 ft)

Population (2026-01-01)
  - Total: 98
  - Density: 17/km^{2} (44/sq mi)
- Time zone: UTC+1 (CET)
  - Summer (DST): UTC+2 (CEST)
- Postal code: 592 51
- Website: www.stritez.cz

Střítež is a municipality and village in Žďár nad Sázavou District in the Vysočina Region of the Czech Republic. It has about 100 inhabitants.

Střítež lies approximately 27 kilometres (17 mi) south-east of Žďár nad Sázavou, 49 km (30 mi) east of Jihlava, and 151 km (94 mi) south-east of Prague.

== Administrative division ==
Střítež consists of two municipal parts (in brackets population according to the 2021 census):

- Střítež (95)
- Nivy (5)

== Demographics ==
Historical population
Year	Pop.	±%
1869	277	—
1880	329	+18.8%
1890	329	+0.0%
1900	248	−24.6%
1910	240	−3.2%
1921	211	−12.1%
1930	221	+4.7%
1950	162	−26.7%
1961	165	+1.9%
1970	112	−32.1%
1980	130	+16.1%
1991	132	+1.5%
2001	94	−28.8%
2011	97	+3.2%
2021	100	+3.1%
Source: Censuses
