= Střítež pod Křemešníkem =

- Municipality
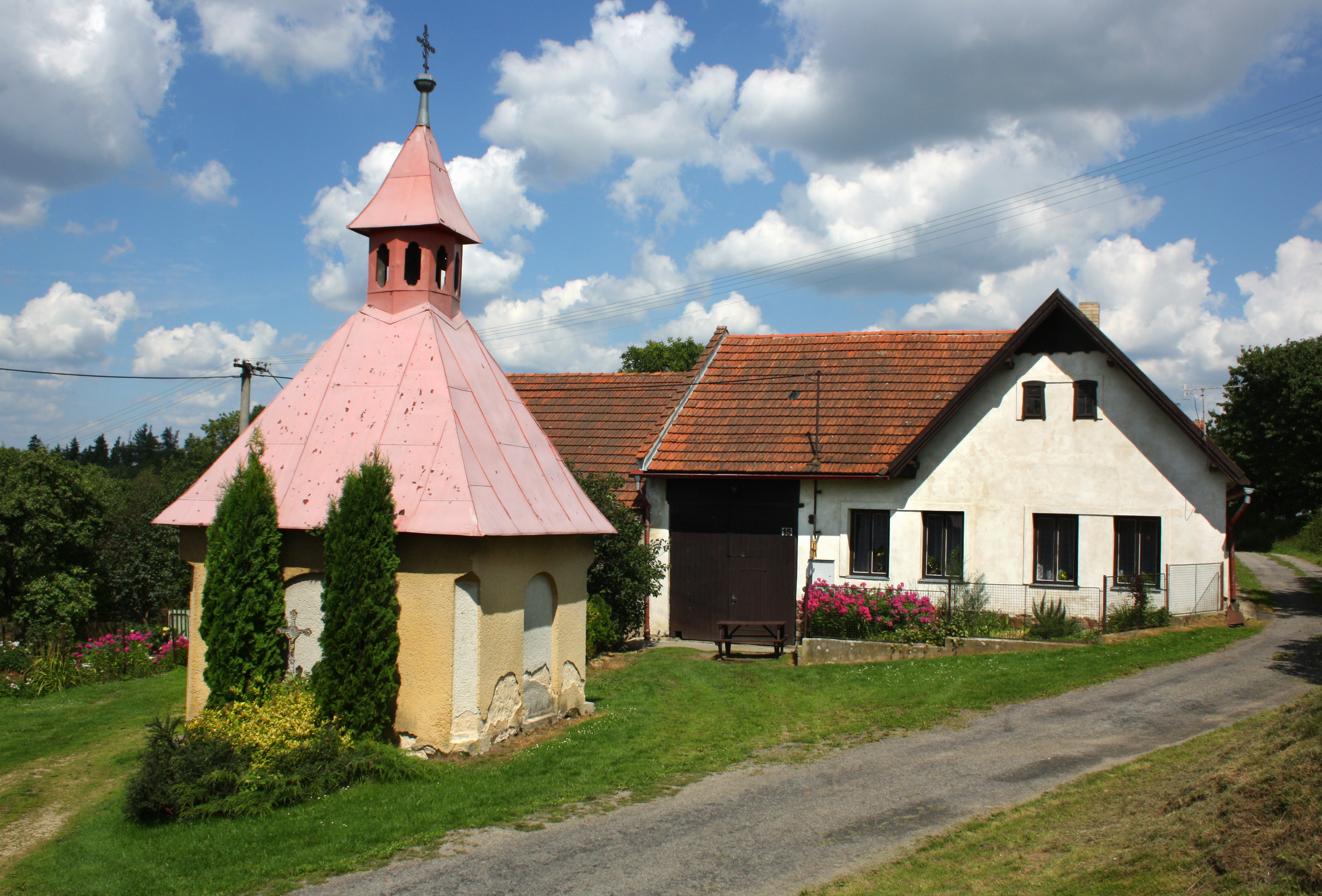
- Chapel

- Flag Coat of arms

- Location in the Czech Republic
- Coordinates: 49°26′3″N 15°19′13″E
- Country: Czech Republic
- Region: Vysočina
- District: Pelhřimov
- First mentioned: 1379

Area
  - Total: 3.74 km^{2} (1.44 sq mi)
- Elevation: 584 m (1,916 ft)

Population (2026-01-01)
  - Total: 63
  - Density: 17/km^{2} (44/sq mi)
- Time zone: UTC+1 (CET)
  - Summer (DST): UTC+2 (CEST)
- Postal code: 393 01
- Website: www.stritezpodkremesnikem.cz

Střítež pod Křemešníkem is a municipality and village in Pelhřimov District in the Vysočina Region of the Czech Republic. It has about 60 inhabitants.

Střítež pod Křemešníkem lies approximately 8 kilometres (5 mi) east of Pelhřimov, 21 km (13 mi) west of Jihlava, and 98 km (61 mi) south-east of Prague.

== Demographics ==
Historical population
Year	Pop.	±%
1869	205	—
1880	211	+2.9%
1890	223	+5.7%
1900	225	+0.9%
1910	198	−12.0%
1921	229	+15.7%
1930	207	−9.6%
1950	151	−27.1%
1961	130	−13.9%
1970	98	−24.6%
1980	78	−20.4%
1991	56	−28.2%
2001	42	−25.0%
2011	45	+7.1%
2021	63	+40.0%
Source: Censuses
