= Dolní Kralovice =

- Municipality
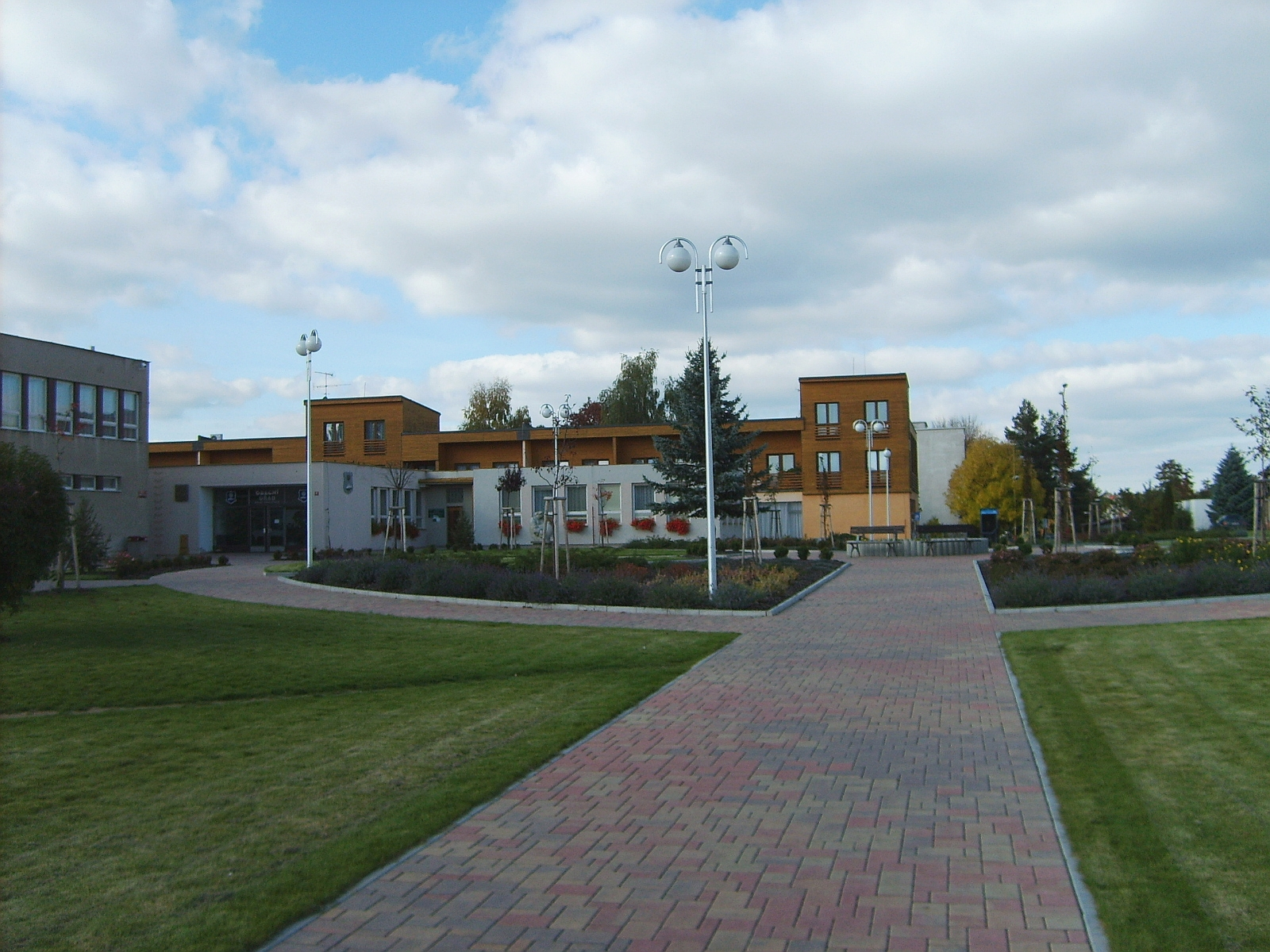
- Municipal office on the square Náměstí Ludvíka Svobody

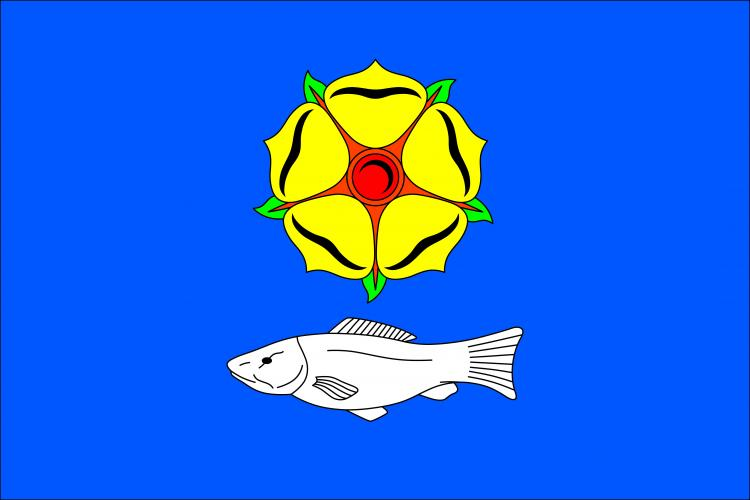
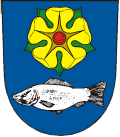
- Flag Coat of arms

- Location in the Czech Republic
- Coordinates: 49°38′42″N 15°10′43″E
- Country: Czech Republic
- Region: Central Bohemian
- District: Benešov
- First mentioned: 1090s

Area
  - Total: 17.22 km^{2} (6.65 sq mi)
- Elevation: 350 m (1,150 ft)

Population (2026-01-01)
  - Total: 931
  - Density: 54.1/km^{2} (140/sq mi)
- Time zone: UTC+1 (CET)
  - Summer (DST): UTC+2 (CEST)
- Postal code: 257 68
- Website: www.dolni-kralovice.cz

Dolní Kralovice is a municipality and village in Benešov District in the Central Bohemian Region of the Czech Republic. It has about 900 inhabitants.

== Administrative division ==
Dolní Kralovice consists of six municipal parts (in brackets population according to the 2021 census):

- Dolní Kralovice (603)
- Libčice (0)
- Martinice u Dolních Kralovic (59)
- Střítež (91)
- Vraždovy Lhotice (81)
- Zahrádčice (23)

== Etymology ==
The name Kralovice is probably derived from the Czech word král (i.e. 'king'), meaning "the village of king's people". It denoted a village founded on land belonging to the king. There is also a theory that the name was derived from the surname Král, meaning "the village of Král's people". From 1603 at the latest, two settlements were distinguished: Dolní ('lower') Kralovice and Horní ('upper) Kralovice.

== Geography ==
Dolní Kralovice is located about 38 kilometres (24 mi) southeast of Benešov and 40 kilometres (25 mi) northwest of Jihlava. It lies in the Křemešník Highlands. The highest point is at 536 m (1,759 ft) above sea level. The northern municipal border runs through the Švihov Reservoir, built on the Želivka River.

== History ==
The first written mention of Dolní Kralovice is in an undated deed of Queen Świętosława of Poland from the end of the 11th century, when she donated the village to the Vyšehrad Chapter. It was a settlement of fishermen. The Vyšehrad Chapter owned the village until the Hussite Wars. In 1440–1547, Dolní Kralovice was a property of the Trčka of Lípa family. Then the village often changed hands and the owners were various lower noblemen.

At the end of the 17th century, Dolní Kralovice was bought by John Leopold, Prince of Trautson and Count of Falkenstein. He and his son Jan Vilém annexed several other villages to the estate. Jan Vilém then moved the administration of the estate from Čechtice to Dolní Kralovice. In 1766–1844, Dolní Kralovice was owned by Counts of Gundelfingen. From 1844 to 1942, the estate was a property of Counts of Auersperg.

In the years 1968–1974, the original Dolní Kralovice was demolished due to the construction of the Švihov Reservoir on the Želivka. A new village was founded near the reservoir, where some residents moved.

== Demographics ==
Historical population

Year	Pop.	±%
1869	1,927	—
1880	1,863	−3.3%
1890	1,882	+1.0%
1900	1,705	−9.4%
1910	1,941	+13.8%

Year	Pop.	±%
1921	1,928	−0.7%
1930	1,831	−5.0%
1950	1,566	−14.5%
1961	1,928	+23.1%
1970	927	−51.9%

Year	Pop.	±%
1980	954	+2.9%
1991	938	−1.7%
2001	905	−3.5%
2011	900	−0.6%
2021	857	−4.8%

Source: Censuses

== Transport ==
There are no railways or major roads passing through the municipality.

== Sights ==
The most valuable building is the Vraždovy Lhotice Castle, located in Vraždovy Lhotice. It is a late Baroque building from the 18th century.

== Notable people ==
- Jaroslav Hlava (1855–1924), pathologist
