= Střítež (Třebíč District) =

- Municipality
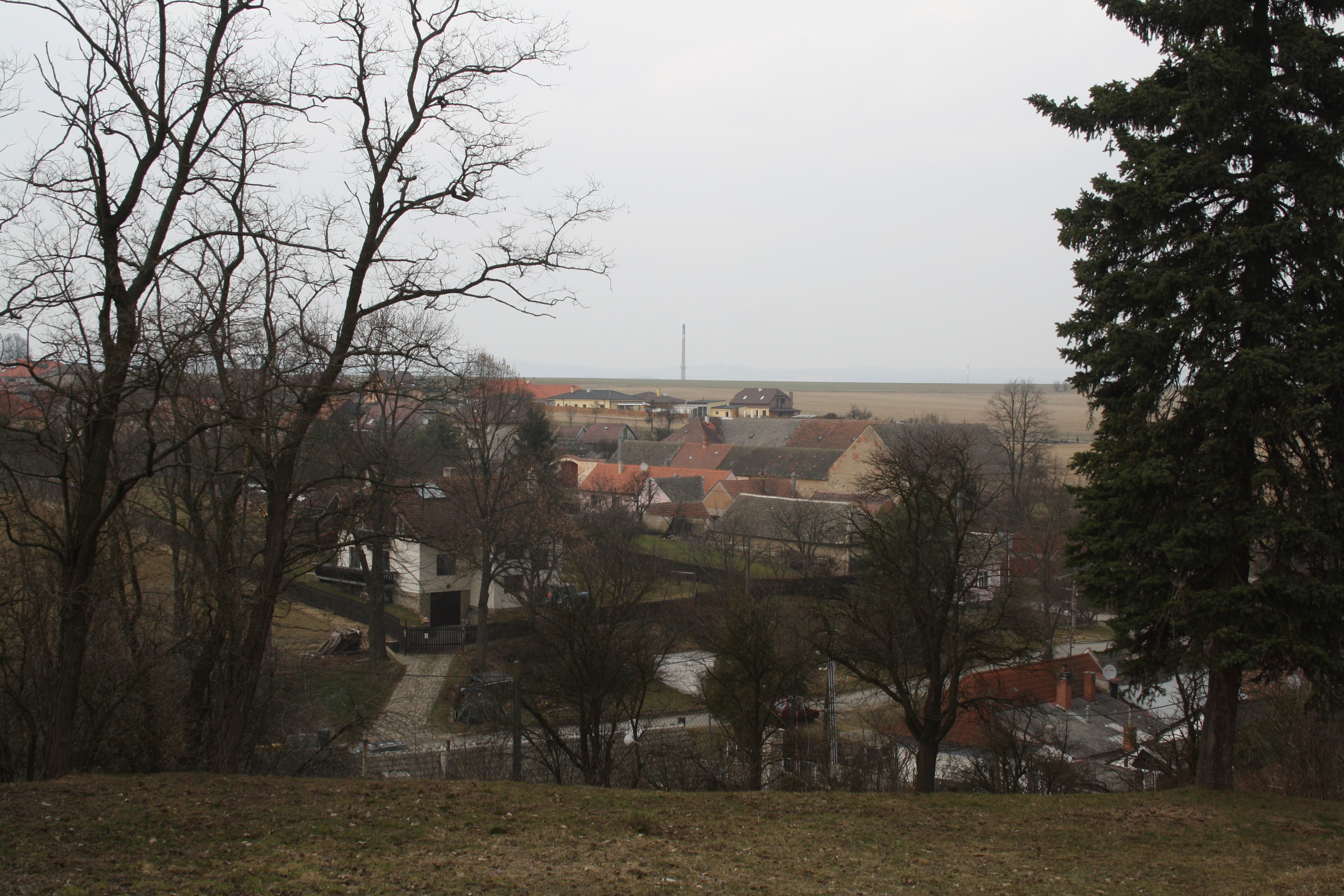
- General view

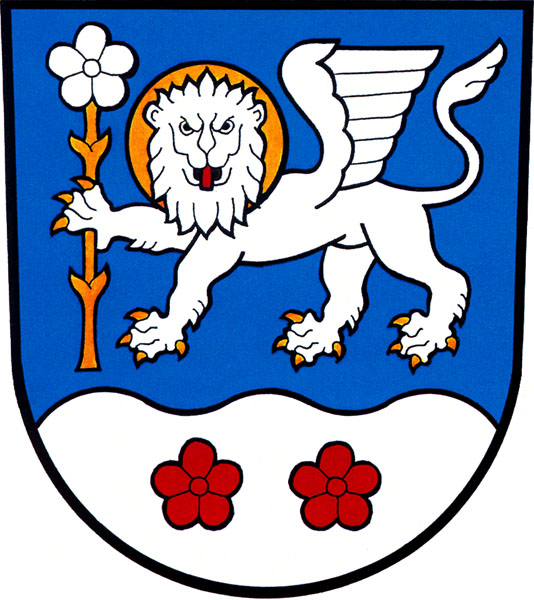
- Flag Coat of arms

- Location in the Czech Republic
- Coordinates: 49°11′29″N 15°53′36″E
- Country: Czech Republic
- Region: Vysočina
- District: Třebíč
- First mentioned: 1104

Area
  - Total: 7.57 km^{2} (2.92 sq mi)
- Elevation: 488 m (1,601 ft)

Population (2026-01-01)
  - Total: 555
  - Density: 73.3/km^{2} (190/sq mi)
- Time zone: UTC+1 (CET)
  - Summer (DST): UTC+2 (CEST)
- Postal code: 674 01
- Website: www.stritez.eu

Střítež is a municipality and village in Třebíč District in the Vysočina Region of the Czech Republic. It has about 600 inhabitants.

Střítež lies approximately 4 kilometres (2 mi) south-east of Třebíč, 33 km (21 mi) south-east of Jihlava, and 147 km (91 mi) south-east of Prague.

== Demographics ==
Historical population
Year	Pop.	±%
1869	300	—
1880	334	+11.3%
1890	335	+0.3%
1900	370	+10.4%
1910	405	+9.5%
1921	375	−7.4%
1930	401	+6.9%
1950	387	−3.5%
1961	375	−3.1%
1970	387	+3.2%
1980	427	+10.3%
1991	435	+1.9%
2001	484	+11.3%
2011	494	+2.1%
2021	537	+8.7%
Source: Censuses
