= Zadní Střítež =

- Municipality
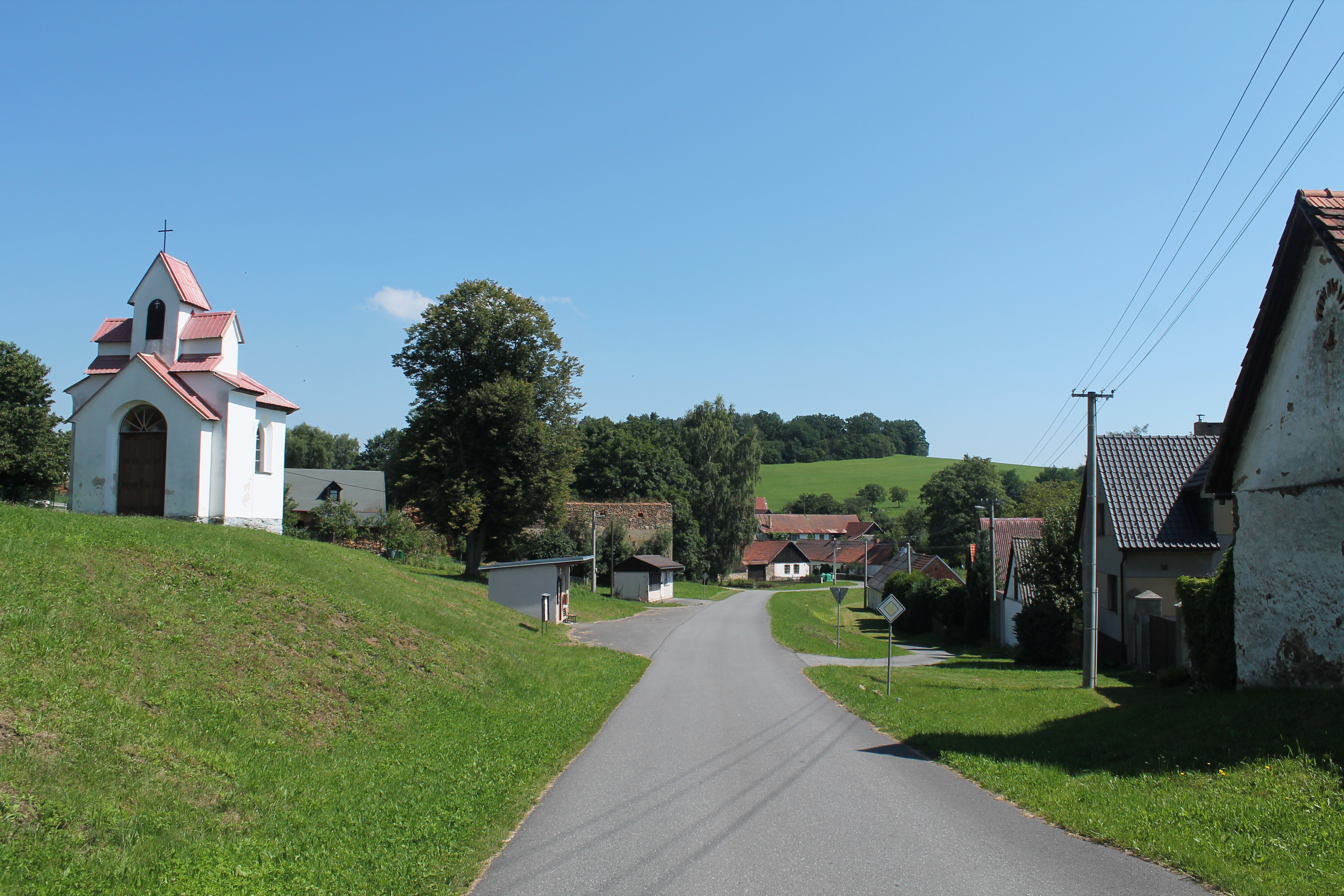
- Centre of Zadní Střítež

- Location in the Czech Republic
- Coordinates: 49°29′39″N 14°55′0″E
- Country: Czech Republic
- Region: South Bohemian
- District: Tábor
- First mentioned: 1381

Area
  - Total: 4.99 km^{2} (1.93 sq mi)
- Elevation: 606 m (1,988 ft)

Population (2026-01-01)
  - Total: 36
  - Density: 7.2/km^{2} (19/sq mi)
- Time zone: UTC+1 (CET)
  - Summer (DST): UTC+2 (CEST)
- Postal code: 391 43
- Website: www.zadnistritez.cz

Zadní Střítež is a municipality and village in Tábor District in the South Bohemian Region of the Czech Republic. It has about 40 inhabitants.

Zadní Střítež lies approximately 21 kilometres (13 mi) north-east of Tábor, 67 km (42 mi) north-east of České Budějovice, and 75 km (47 mi) south-east of Prague.

== Demographics ==
Historical population
Year	Pop.	±%
1869	349	—
1880	340	−2.6%
1890	347	+2.1%
1900	343	−1.2%
1910	329	−4.1%
1921	304	−7.6%
1930	282	−7.2%
1950	193	−31.6%
1961	173	−10.4%
1970	135	−22.0%
1980	87	−35.6%
1991	68	−21.8%
2001	46	−32.4%
2011	31	−32.6%
2021	34	+9.7%
Source: Censuses
