= Střítež nad Ludinou =

- Municipality
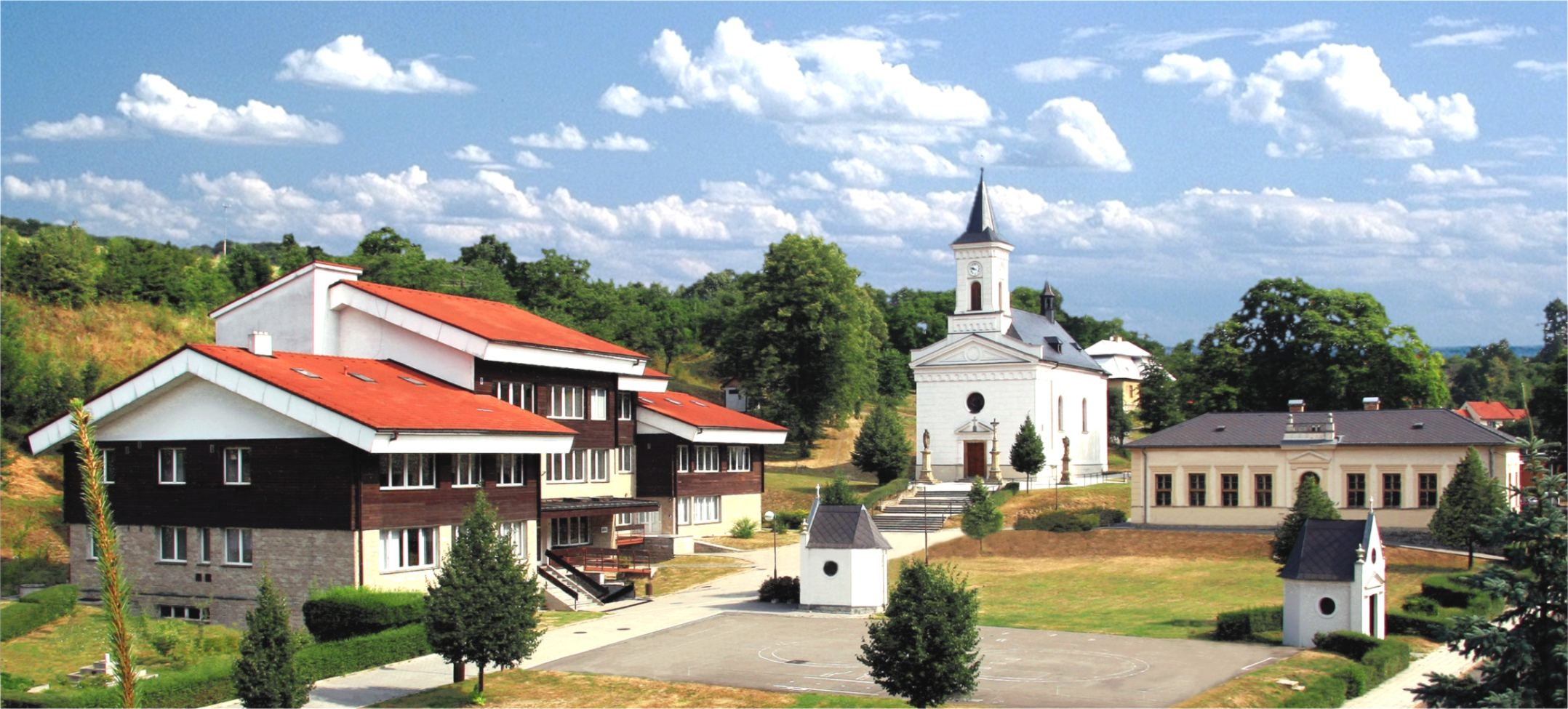
- Centre of Střítež nad Ludinou

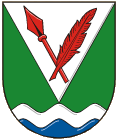
- Flag Coat of arms

- Location in the Czech Republic
- Coordinates: 49°36′34″N 17°44′20″E
- Country: Czech Republic
- Region: Olomouc
- District: Přerov
- First mentioned: 1371

Area
  - Total: 14.82 km^{2} (5.72 sq mi)
- Elevation: 338 m (1,109 ft)

Population (2026-01-01)
  - Total: 843
  - Density: 56.9/km^{2} (147/sq mi)
- Time zone: UTC+1 (CET)
  - Summer (DST): UTC+2 (CEST)
- Postal code: 753 63
- Website: www.striteznl.cz

Střítež nad Ludinou (German: Ohrensdorf) is a municipality and village in Přerov District in the Olomouc Region of the Czech Republic. It has about 800 inhabitants.

Střítež nad Ludinou lies approximately 27 kilometres (17 mi) north-east of Přerov, 36 km (22 mi) east of Olomouc, and 245 km (152 mi) east of Prague.

== Demographics ==
Historical population
Year	Pop.	±%
1869	862	—
1880	800	−7.2%
1890	835	+4.4%
1900	808	−3.2%
1910	834	+3.2%
1921	894	+7.2%
1930	875	−2.1%
1950	932	+6.5%
1961	951	+2.0%
1970	950	−0.1%
1980	884	−6.9%
1991	817	−7.6%
2001	846	+3.5%
2011	816	−3.5%
2021	814	−0.2%
Source: Censuses
