= Střítež (Pelhřimov District) =

- Municipality
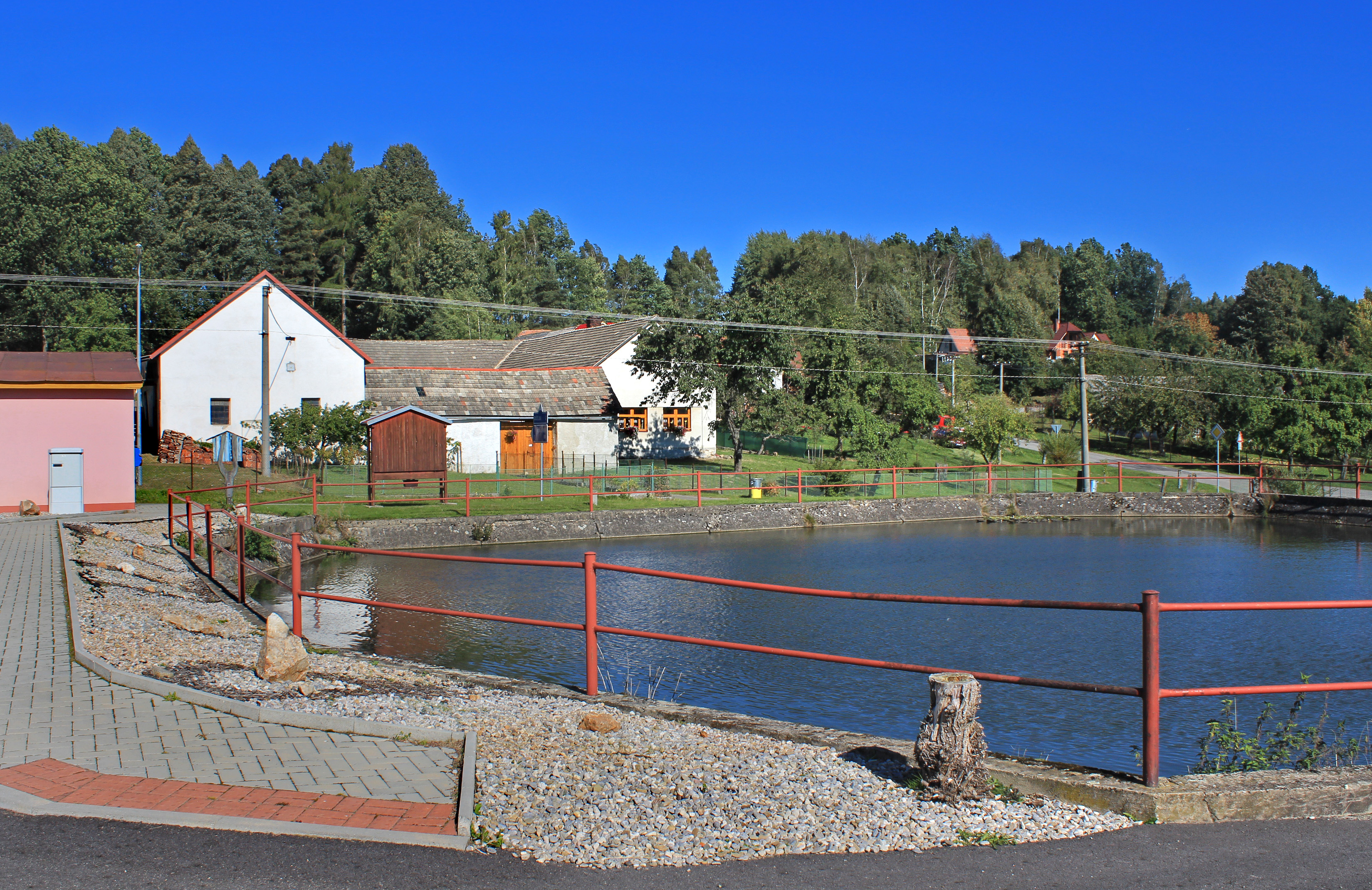
- Centre of Střítež

- Location in the Czech Republic
- Coordinates: 49°21′50″N 15°7′36″E
- Country: Czech Republic
- Region: Vysočina
- District: Pelhřimov
- First mentioned: 1386

Area
  - Total: 12.77 km^{2} (4.93 sq mi)
- Elevation: 633 m (2,077 ft)

Population (2026-01-01)
  - Total: 111
  - Density: 8.69/km^{2} (22.5/sq mi)
- Time zone: UTC+1 (CET)
  - Summer (DST): UTC+2 (CEST)
- Postal codes: 393 01, 394 61
- Website: www.obec-stritez.cz

Střítež is a municipality and village in Pelhřimov District in the Vysočina Region of the Czech Republic. It has about 100 inhabitants.

Střítež lies approximately 11 kilometres (7 mi) south-west of Pelhřimov, 34 km (21 mi) west of Jihlava, and 96 km (60 mi) south-east of Prague.

== Administrative division ==
Střítež consists of three municipal parts (in brackets population according to the 2021 census):

- Střítež (72)
- Bor (17)
- Krumvald (11)

== Demographics ==
Historical population
Year	Pop.	±%
1869	541	—
1880	597	+10.4%
1890	541	−9.4%
1900	555	+2.6%
1910	506	−8.8%
1921	482	−4.7%
1930	459	−4.8%
1950	311	−32.2%
1961	290	−6.8%
1970	233	−19.7%
1980	161	−30.9%
1991	120	−25.5%
2001	107	−10.8%
2011	96	−10.3%
2021	100	+4.2%
Source: Censuses
