= Jaroslav Hlava =

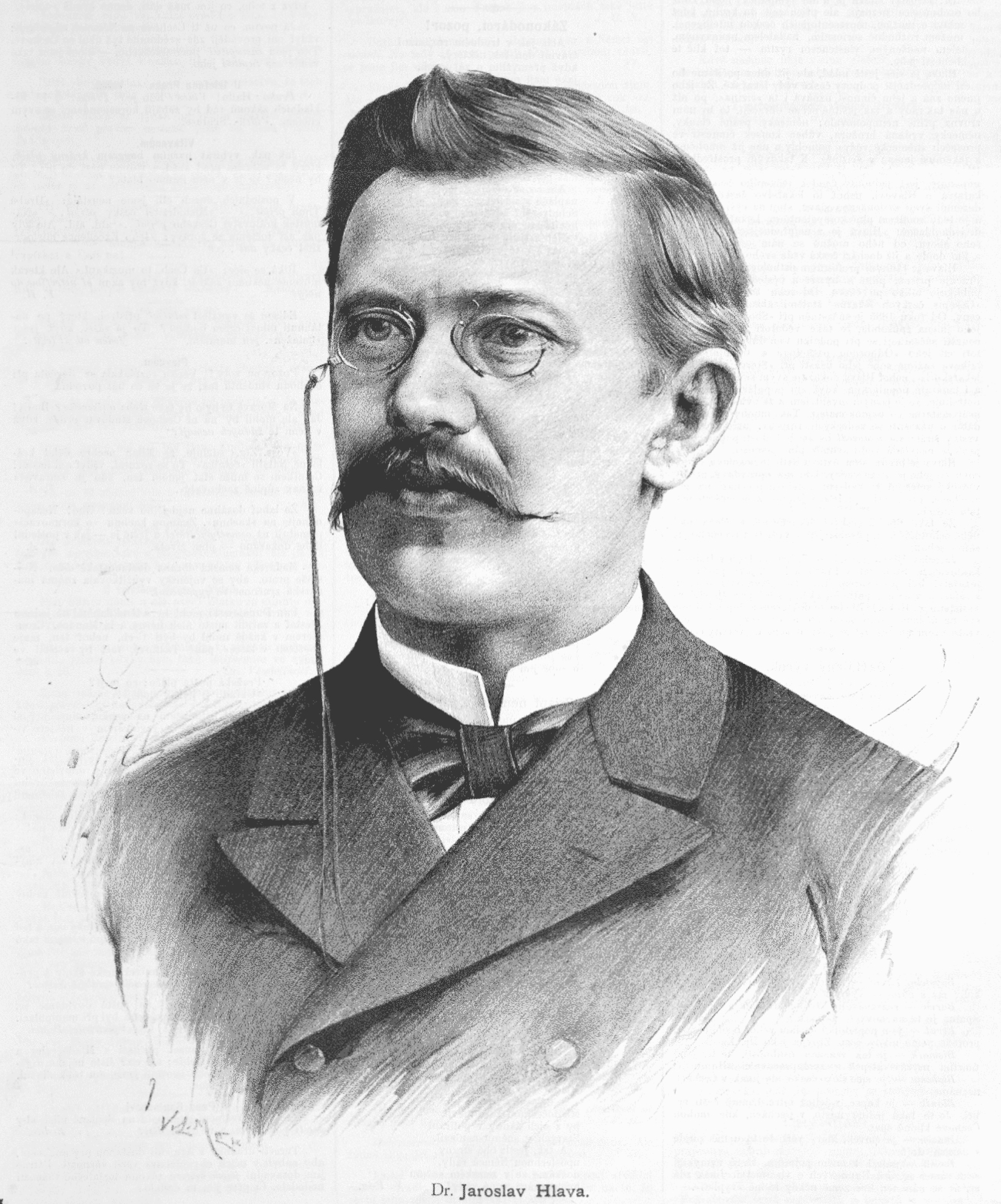
Portrait of Hlava by Jan Vilímek

Jaroslav Hlava (7 May 1855 – 31 October 1924) was a Czech anatomical pathologist.

== Life and career ==
Hlava was born on 7 May 1855 in Dolní Kralovice, Bohemia, Austrian Empire. In 1879, he graduated from the Medical Faculty of Charles University in Prague. In 1887, he became a full professor of pathological anatomy. He was rector of Prague's General Hospital and director of the Czech Institute of Pathological Anatomy. He was a pioneer in bacteriology and studied the etiology of infectious diseases and oncology.

In 1887, Hlava authored a widely cited article entitled About Dysentery. Due to a translation error, the article was attributed to O. Uplavici in English publications until 1938. The name of author was written in small characters, and the title O úplavici ('About dysentery' in Czech) was mistaken for the name of the author and předběžné sdělení ('preliminary communication') for About Dysentery. The mistake was corrected in 1939 by English biologist Clifford Dobell, writing about the history of this mistake in the article "Dr. O. Uplavici (1887–1938)".

In 1906–1907, Hlava was the rector of the Charles University. He died on 31 October 1924 in Prague, aged 69. A street in Prague-New Town was named Hlavova in honour of him.
