= Fred Hlava =

American politician

Member of the Nebraska Legislature from the 49th district
- In office June 6, 2002 – January 7, 2003
- Preceded by: Bob Wickersham
- Succeeded by: LeRoy Louden

Personal details
- Born: December 27, 1944 (age 81)
- Party: Republican
- Spouse: Wendy
- Children: 2
- Education: Chadron State College
- Occupation: City manager, cattle producer, businessman

Military service
- Allegiance: United States
- Branch/service: United States Army
- Years of service: 1966–1969

Fred Hlava (born December 27, 1944) is a Republican politician from Nebraska who served as a member of the Nebraska Legislature from the 49th district from 2002 to 2003.

== Early life ==
Hlava was born in Gordon, Nebraska, on December 27, 1944, and graduated from Gordon High School in 1963. He served in the U.S. Army from 1966 to 1969, and later attended Chadron State College, graduating in 1971 with his bachelor's degree in social work. Hlava worked as a family counselor from 1971 to 1973, and owned and operated two businesses in Gordon, Gordon Tire & Supply, Inc., and Hlava Distributing. In 1985, Hlava was appointed the city manager of Gordon. He served as the president of the Nebraska City Management Association and on the Nebraska Environmental Quality Council.

== Nebraska Legislature ==
In 2002, following the appointment of State Senator Bob Wickersham to the Nebraska Tax Equalization and Review Commission, Governor Mike Johanns appointed Hlava to serve until a special election could be held later that year. He was sworn in on June 6, 2002. The vacancy occurred after the filing deadline for the primary election, so Hlava gathered signatures to appear on the general election ballot, as did rancher LeRoy Louden. In the general election, Louden ultimately defeated Hlava, winning 57 percent of the vote to Hlava's 43 percent.
