= Střítež (Jihlava District) =

- Municipality
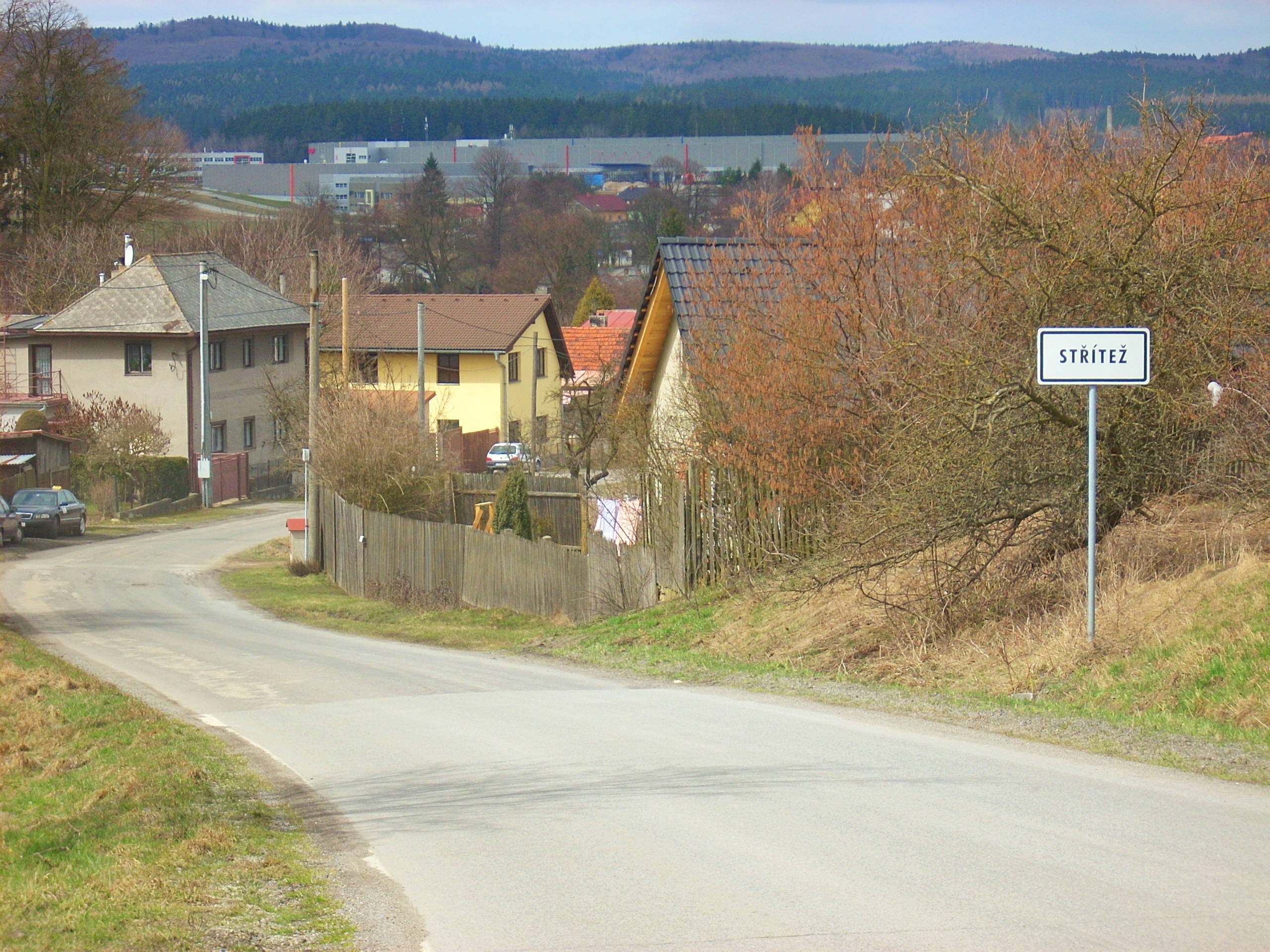
- View from the east

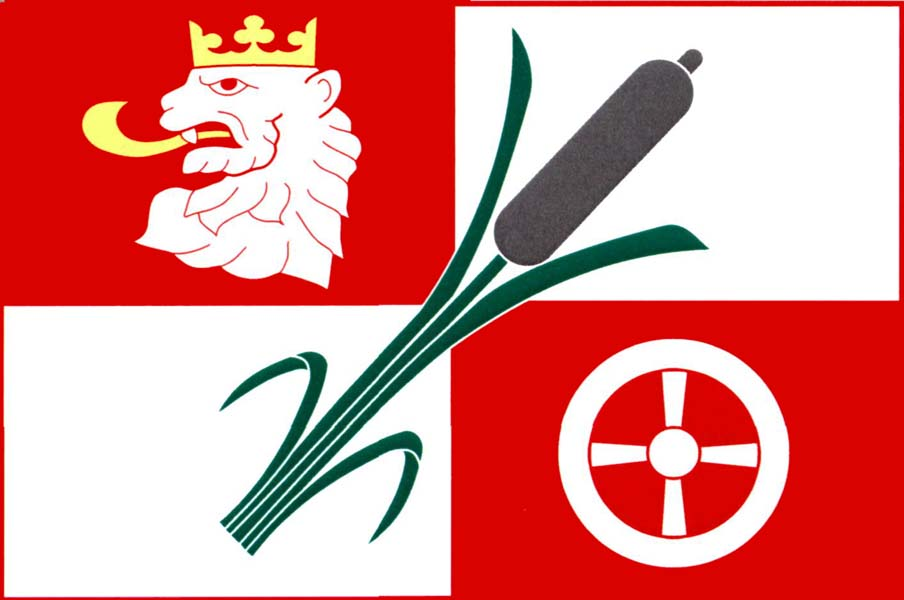
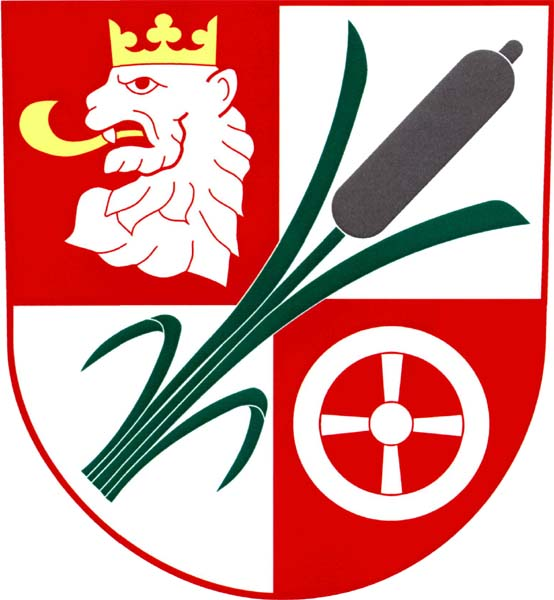
- Flag Coat of arms

- Location in the Czech Republic
- Coordinates: 49°27′23″N 15°37′41″E
- Country: Czech Republic
- Region: Vysočina
- District: Jihlava
- First mentioned: 1347

Area
  - Total: 7.46 km^{2} (2.88 sq mi)
- Elevation: 483 m (1,585 ft)

Population (2026-01-01)
  - Total: 481
  - Density: 64.5/km^{2} (167/sq mi)
- Time zone: UTC+1 (CET)
  - Summer (DST): UTC+2 (CEST)
- Postal code: 588 11
- Website: www.stritez-ji.cz

Střítež (Czech pronunciation: [ˈstr̝̊iːtɛʃ]) is a municipality and village in Jihlava District in the Vysočina Region of the Czech Republic. It has about 500 inhabitants.

Střítež lies approximately 8 kilometres (5 mi) north of Jihlava and 112 km (70 mi) south-east of Prague.

== Demographics ==
Historical population
Year	Pop.	±%
1869	742	—
1880	610	−17.8%
1890	861	+41.1%
1900	562	−34.7%
1910	526	−6.4%
1921	1,010	+92.0%
1930	653	−35.3%
1950	844	+29.2%
1961	841	−0.4%
1970	489	−41.9%
1980	338	−30.9%
1991	319	−5.6%
2001	332	+4.1%
2011	390	+17.5%
2021	457	+17.2%
Source: Censuses
