= Litochovice =

- Municipality
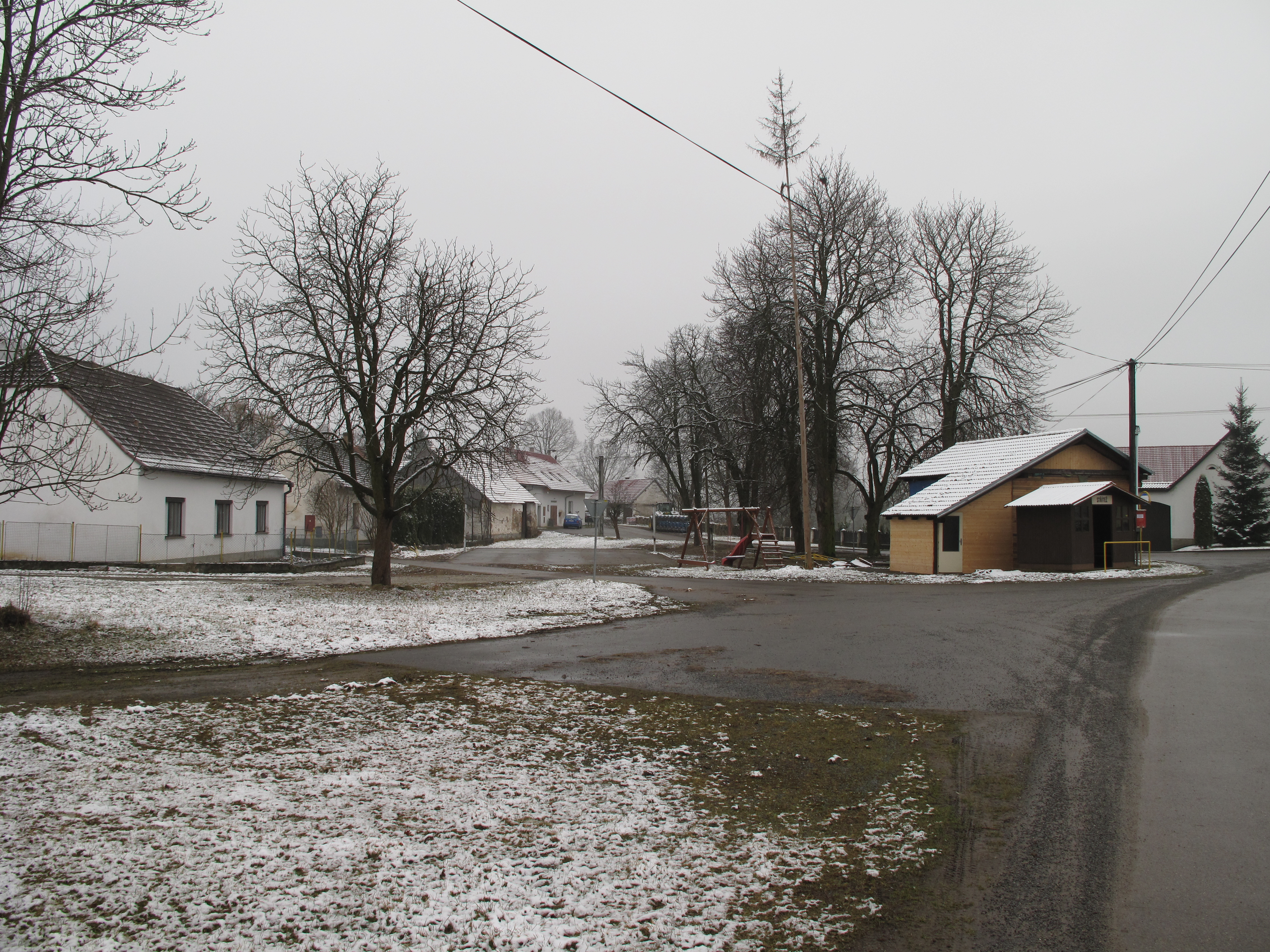
- Střítež, a part of Litochovice

- Location in the Czech Republic
- Coordinates: 49°9′34″N 13°56′29″E
- Country: Czech Republic
- Region: South Bohemian
- District: Strakonice
- First mentioned: 1400

Area
  - Total: 10.95 km^{2} (4.23 sq mi)
- Elevation: 458 m (1,503 ft)

Population (2026-01-01)
  - Total: 291
  - Density: 26.6/km^{2} (68.8/sq mi)
- Time zone: UTC+1 (CET)
  - Summer (DST): UTC+2 (CEST)
- Postal code: 387 01
- Website: www.litochovice.cz

Litochovice is a municipality and village in Strakonice District in the South Bohemian Region of the Czech Republic. It has about 300 inhabitants.

Litochovice lies approximately 13 kilometres (8 mi) south of Strakonice, 44 km (27 mi) north-west of České Budějovice, and 109 km (68 mi) south of Prague.

== Administrative division ==
Litochovice consists of three municipal parts (in brackets population according to the 2021 census):

- Litochovice (144)
- Neuslužice (45)
- Střítež (85)

== Demographics ==
Historical population
Year	Pop.	±%
1869	548	—
1880	569	+3.8%
1890	570	+0.2%
1900	559	−1.9%
1910	624	+11.6%
1921	620	−0.6%
1930	526	−15.2%
1950	370	−29.7%
1961	338	−8.6%
1970	328	−3.0%
1980	298	−9.1%
1991	257	−13.8%
2001	259	+0.8%
2011	281	+8.5%
2021	274	−2.5%
Source: Censuses
