= Rácovice =

- Municipality
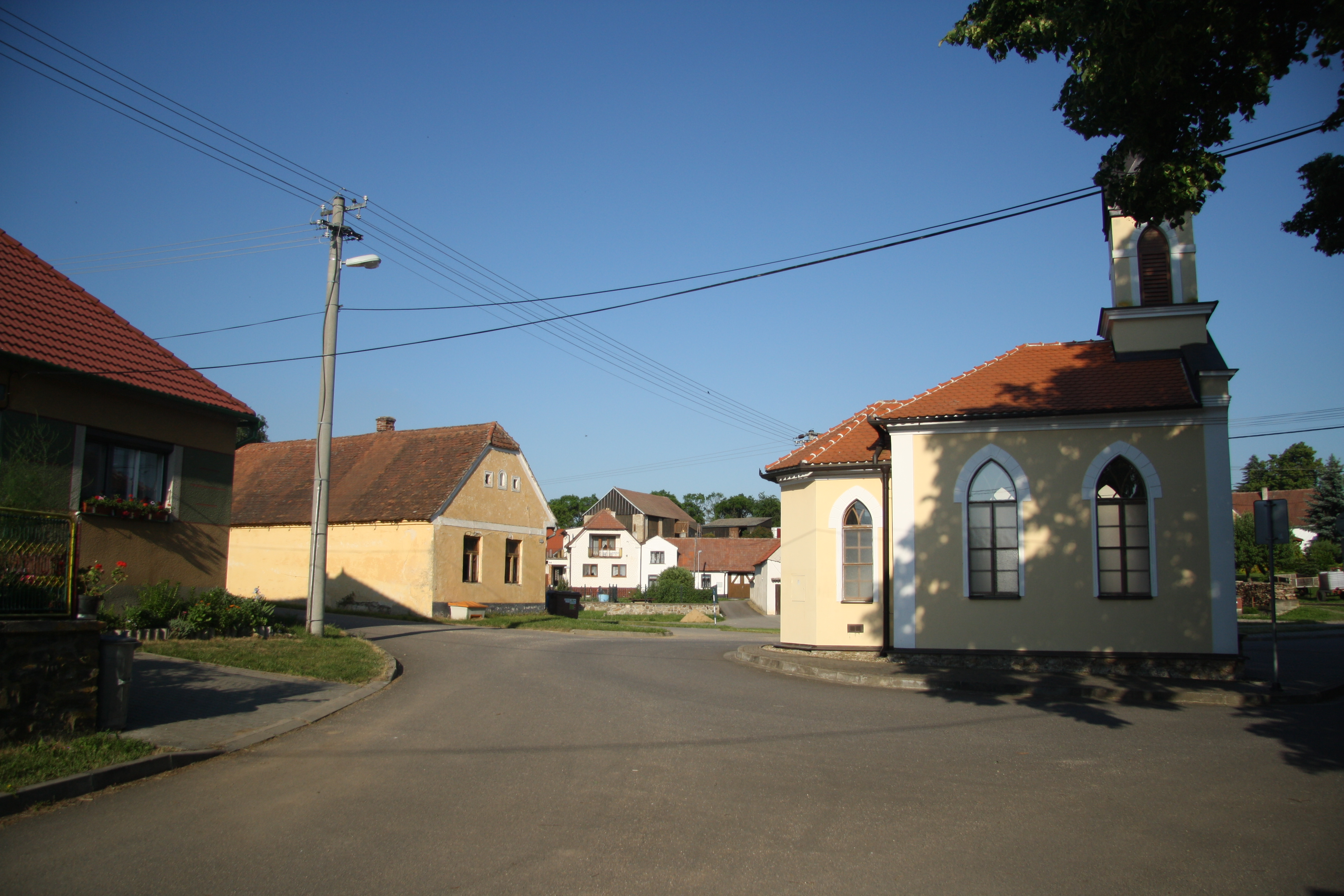
- Chapel of Saints Cyril and Methodius

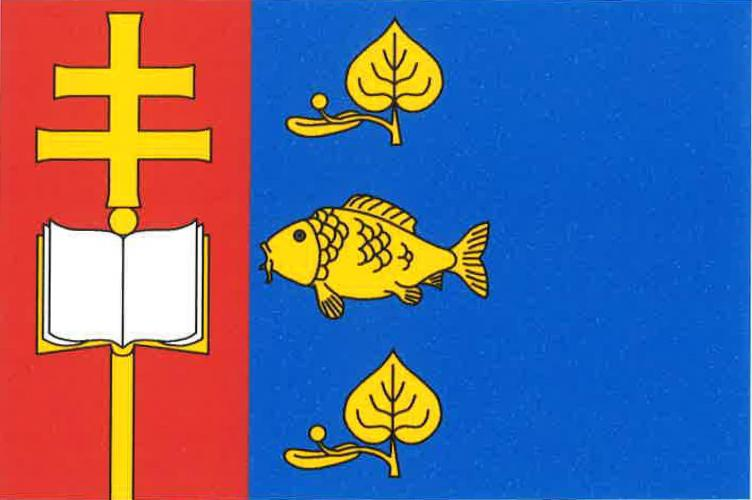
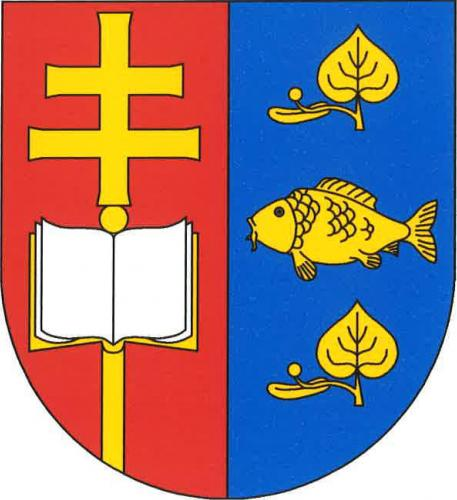
- Flag Coat of arms

- Location in the Czech Republic
- Coordinates: 49°1′16″N 15°41′13″E
- Country: Czech Republic
- Region: Vysočina
- District: Třebíč
- First mentioned: 1354

Area
  - Total: 7.21 km^{2} (2.78 sq mi)
- Elevation: 463 m (1,519 ft)

Population (2026-01-01)
  - Total: 124
  - Density: 17.2/km^{2} (44.5/sq mi)
- Time zone: UTC+1 (CET)
  - Summer (DST): UTC+2 (CEST)
- Postal code: 675 32
- Website: racovice.cz

Rácovice is a municipality and village in Třebíč District in the Vysočina Region of the Czech Republic. It has about 100 inhabitants.

Rácovice lies approximately 27 kilometres (17 mi) south-west of Třebíč, 43 km (27 mi) south of Jihlava, and 150 km (93 mi) south-east of Prague.

== Demographics ==
Historical population
| Year | Pop. | ±% |
|---|---|---|
| 1869 | 229 | — |
| 1880 | 243 | +6.1% |
| 1890 | 236 | −2.9% |
| 1900 | 241 | +2.1% |
| 1910 | 253 | +5.0% |
| 1921 | 267 | +5.5% |
| 1930 | 251 | −6.0% |
| 1950 | 178 | −29.1% |
| 1961 | 188 | +5.6% |
| 1970 | 173 | −8.0% |
| 1980 | 139 | −19.7% |
| 1991 | 106 | −23.7% |
| 2001 | 105 | −0.9% |
| 2011 | 113 | +7.6% |
| 2021 | 118 | +4.4% |
Source: Censuses
