= Menhartice =

- Municipality
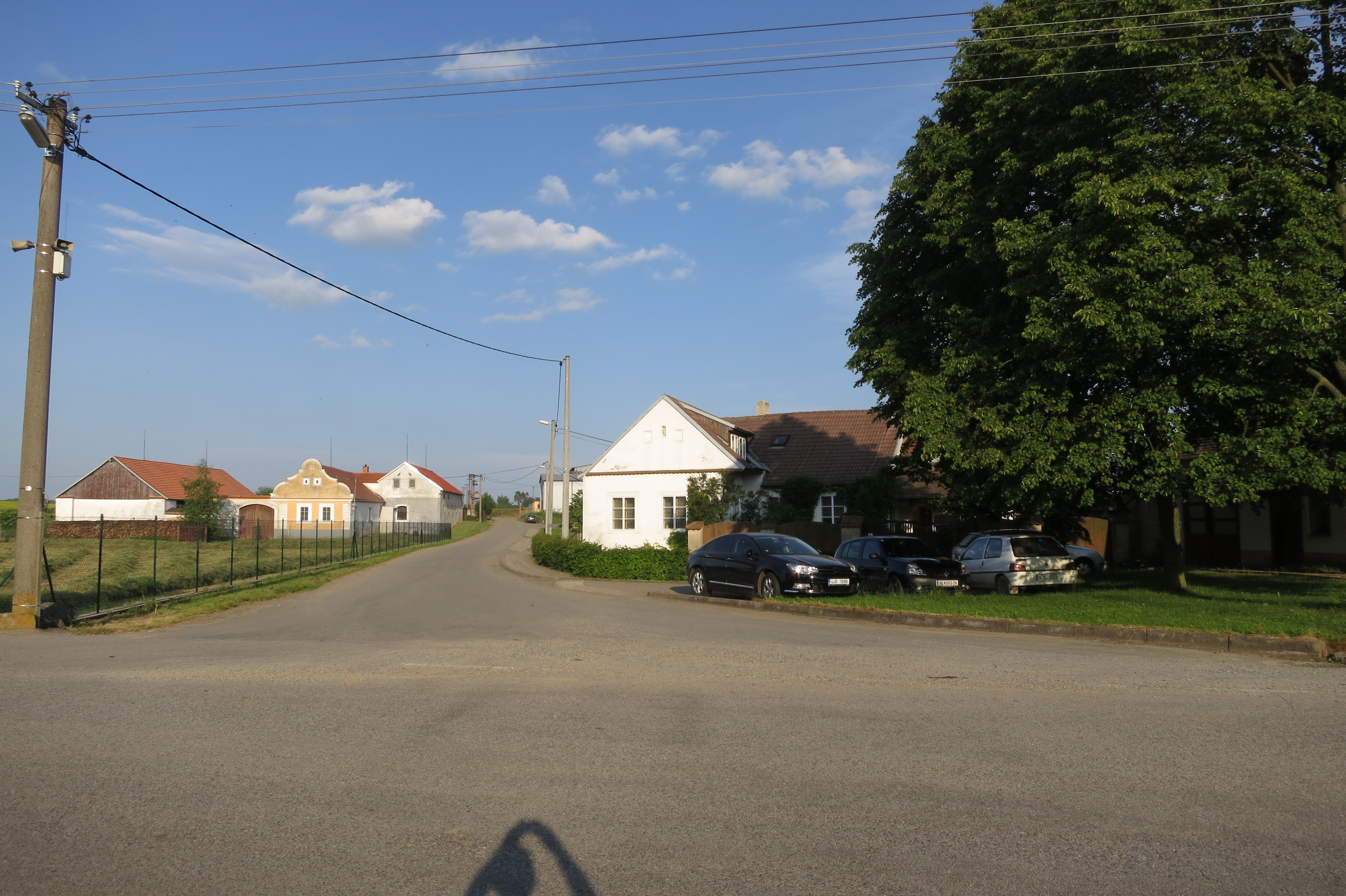
- Centre of Menhartice

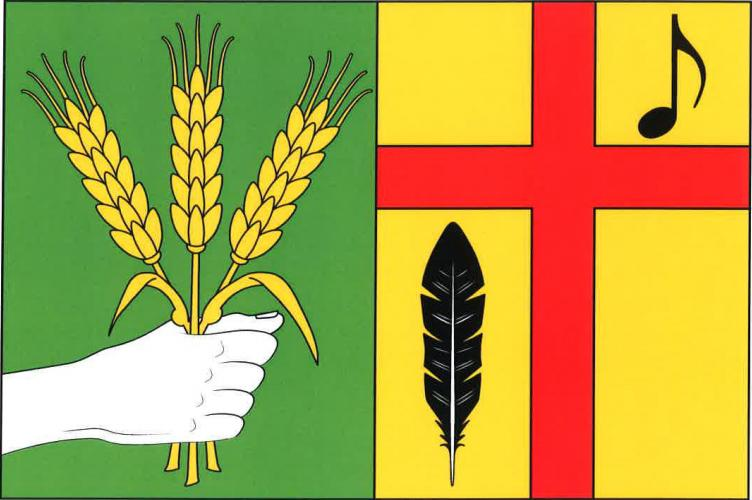
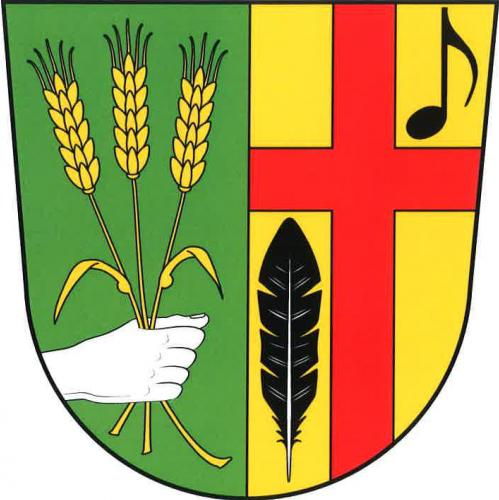
- Flag Coat of arms

- Location in the Czech Republic
- Coordinates: 48°59′24″N 15°33′9″E
- Country: Czech Republic
- Region: Vysočina
- District: Třebíč
- First mentioned: 1312

Area
  - Total: 4.74 km^{2} (1.83 sq mi)
- Elevation: 485 m (1,591 ft)

Population (2026-01-01)
  - Total: 136
  - Density: 28.7/km^{2} (74.3/sq mi)
- Time zone: UTC+1 (CET)
  - Summer (DST): UTC+2 (CEST)
- Postal code: 675 31
- Website: www.menhartice.cz

Menhartice (German: Meinhardsdorf) is a municipality and village in Třebíč District in the Vysočina Region of the Czech Republic. It has about 100 inhabitants.

Menhartice lies approximately 35 kilometres (22 mi) south-west of Třebíč, 45 km (28 mi) south of Jihlava, and 147 km (91 mi) south-east of Prague.

== Demographics ==
Historical population
Year	Pop.	±%
1869	210	—
1880	201	−4.3%
1890	203	+1.0%
1900	225	+10.8%
1910	233	+3.6%
1921	253	+8.6%
1930	233	−7.9%
1950	198	−15.0%
1961	175	−11.6%
1970	140	−20.0%
1980	163	+16.4%
1991	146	−10.4%
2001	162	+11.0%
2011	137	−15.4%
2021	127	−7.3%
Source: Censuses
