= Lovčovice =

- Municipality
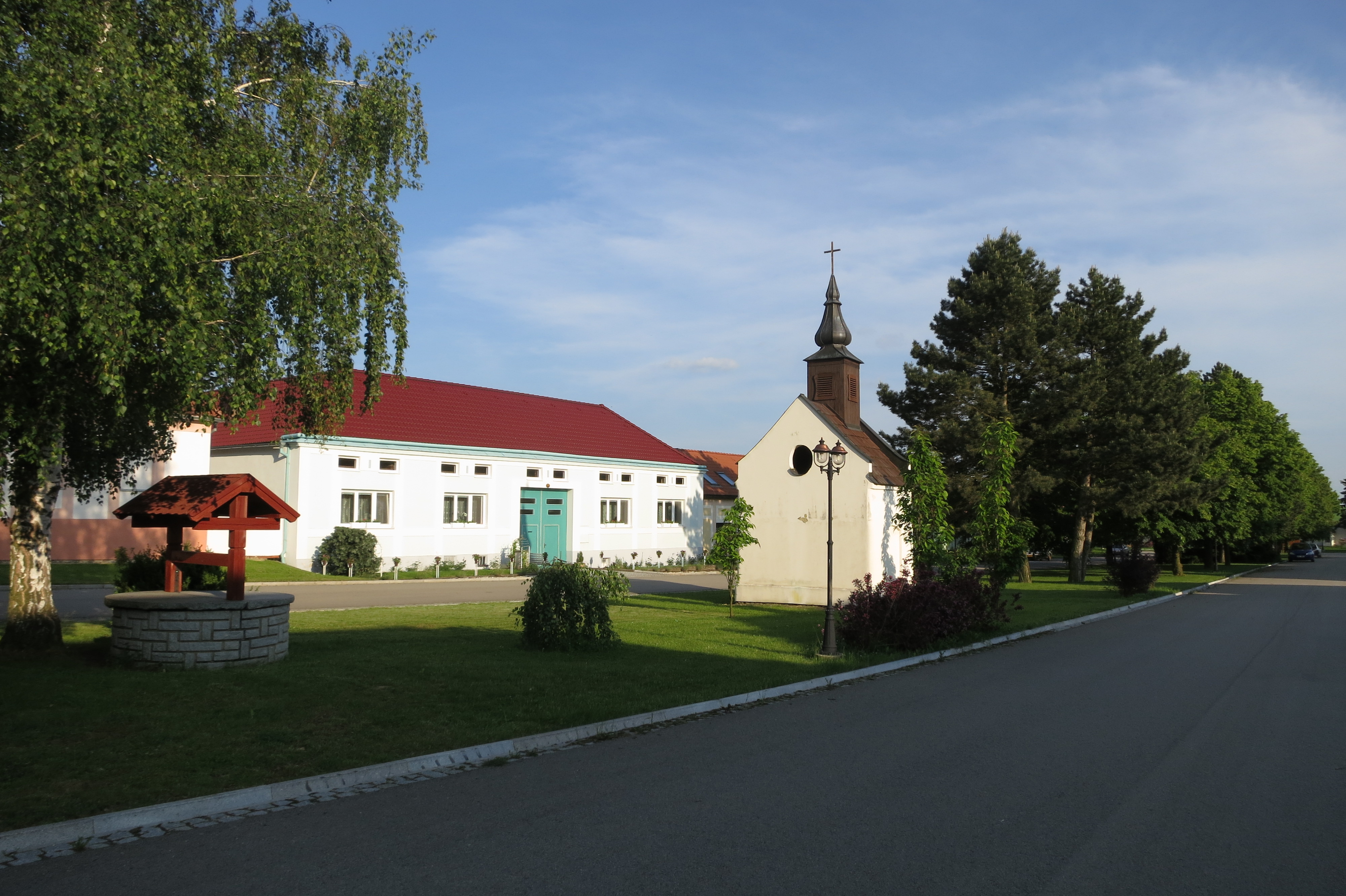
- Centre of Lovčovice

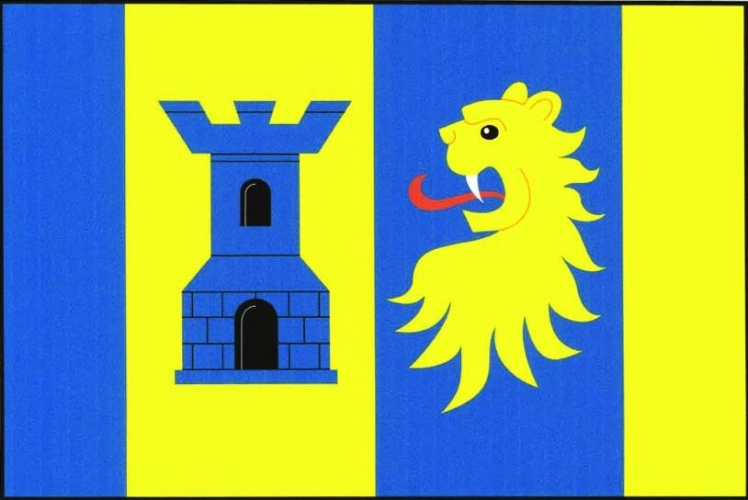
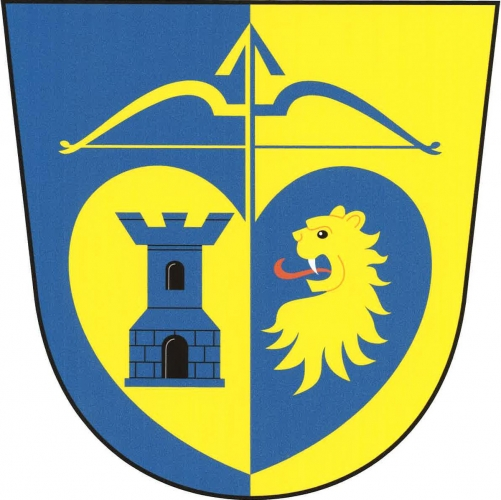
- Flag Coat of arms

- Location in the Czech Republic
- Coordinates: 48°58′54″N 15°32′4″E
- Country: Czech Republic
- Region: Vysočina
- District: Třebíč
- First mentioned: 1351

Area
  - Total: 3.90 km^{2} (1.51 sq mi)
- Elevation: 454 m (1,490 ft)

Population (2026-01-01)
  - Total: 67
  - Density: 17/km^{2} (44/sq mi)
- Time zone: UTC+1 (CET)
  - Summer (DST): UTC+2 (CEST)
- Postal code: 675 31
- Website: www.lovcovice.cz

Lovčovice is a municipality and village in Třebíč District in the Vysočina Region of the Czech Republic. It has about 70 inhabitants.

Lovčovice lies approximately 37 kilometres (23 mi) south-west of Třebíč, 47 km (29 mi) south of Jihlava, and 148 km (92 mi) south-east of Prague.

== Demographics ==
Historical population
Year	Pop.	±%
1869	119	—
1880	110	−7.6%
1890	113	+2.7%
1900	125	+10.6%
1910	117	−6.4%
1921	136	+16.2%
1930	134	−1.5%
1950	72	−46.3%
1961	70	−2.8%
1970	78	+11.4%
1980	77	−1.3%
1991	71	−7.8%
2001	64	−9.9%
2011	56	−12.5%
2021	63	+12.5%
Source: Censuses
