= Pyšel =

- Municipality
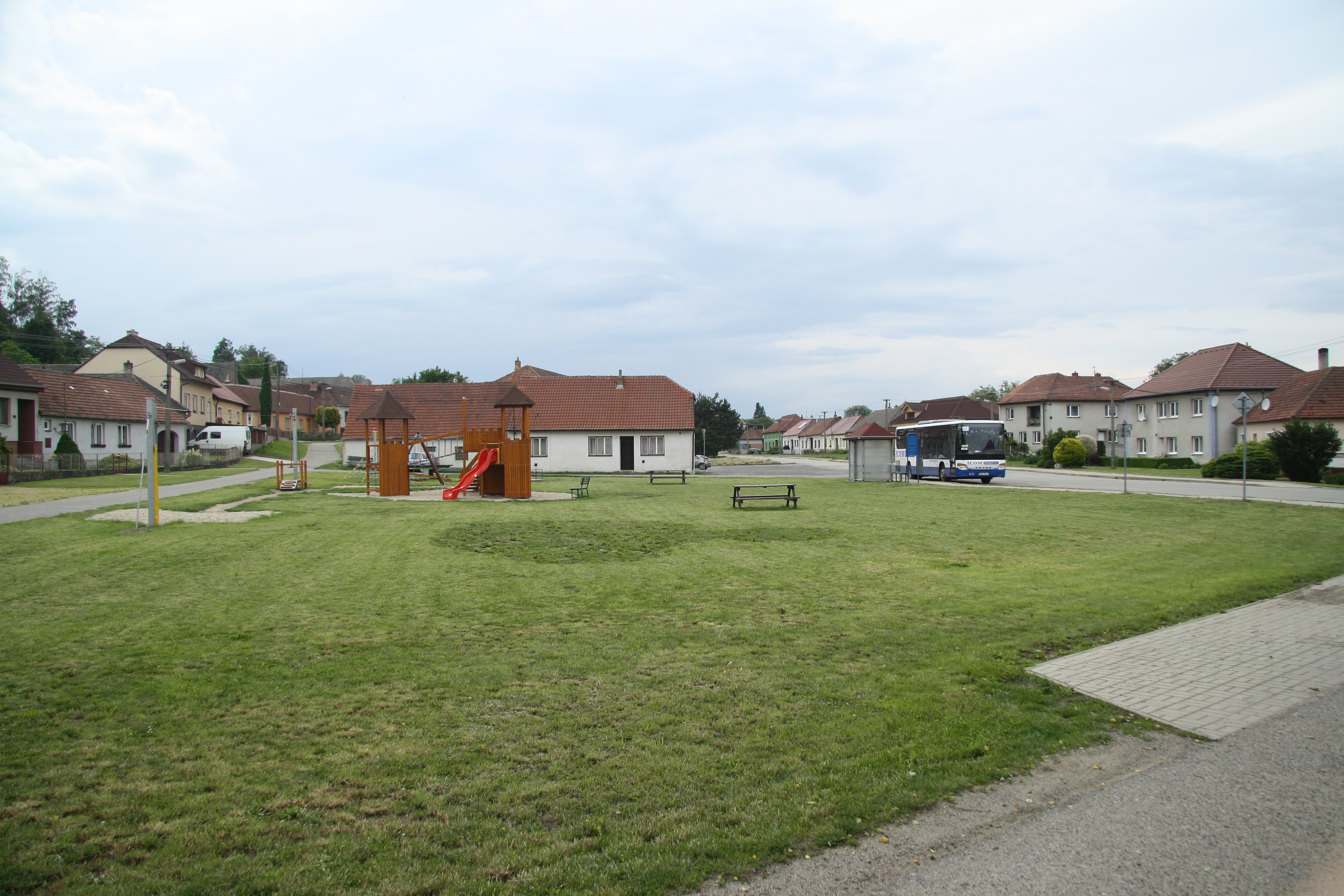
- Centre of Pyšel

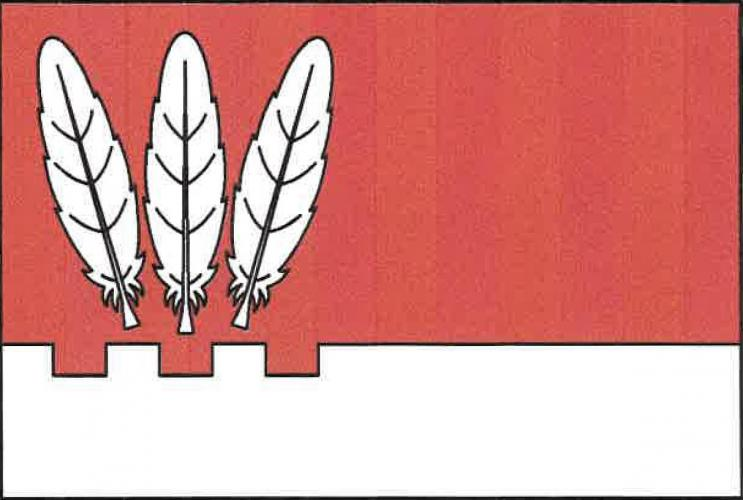
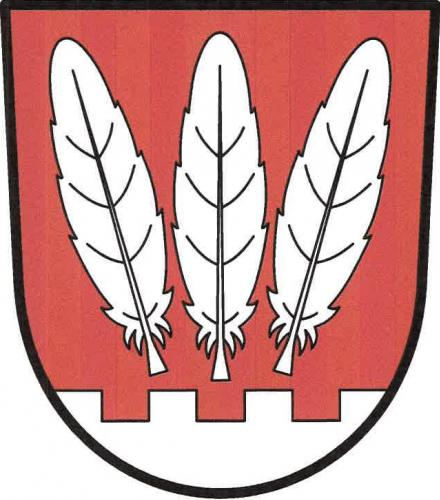
- Flag Coat of arms

- Location in the Czech Republic
- Coordinates: 49°15′2″N 16°3′59″E
- Country: Czech Republic
- Region: Vysočina
- District: Třebíč
- First mentioned: 1349

Area
  - Total: 11.77 km^{2} (4.54 sq mi)
- Elevation: 468 m (1,535 ft)

Population (2026-01-01)
  - Total: 481
  - Density: 40.9/km^{2} (106/sq mi)
- Time zone: UTC+1 (CET)
  - Summer (DST): UTC+2 (CEST)
- Postal code: 675 71
- Website: www.pysel.cz

Pyšel is a municipality and village in Třebíč District in the Vysočina Region of the Czech Republic. It has about 500 inhabitants.

Pyšel lies approximately 14 kilometres (9 mi) east of Třebíč, 38 km (24 mi) south-east of Jihlava, and 151 km (94 mi) south-east of Prague.

== Administrative division ==
Pyšel consists of two municipal parts (in brackets population according to the 2021 census):

- Pyšel (386)
- Vaneč (79)

== Demographics ==
Historical population
Year	Pop.	±%
1869	572	—
1880	559	−2.3%
1890	571	+2.1%
1900	552	−3.3%
1910	518	−6.2%
1921	561	+8.3%
1930	593	+5.7%
1950	520	−12.3%
1961	539	+3.7%
1970	490	−9.1%
1980	487	−0.6%
1991	463	−4.9%
2001	458	−1.1%
2011	450	−1.7%
2021	465	+3.3%
Source: Censuses
