= Vícenice =

- Municipality
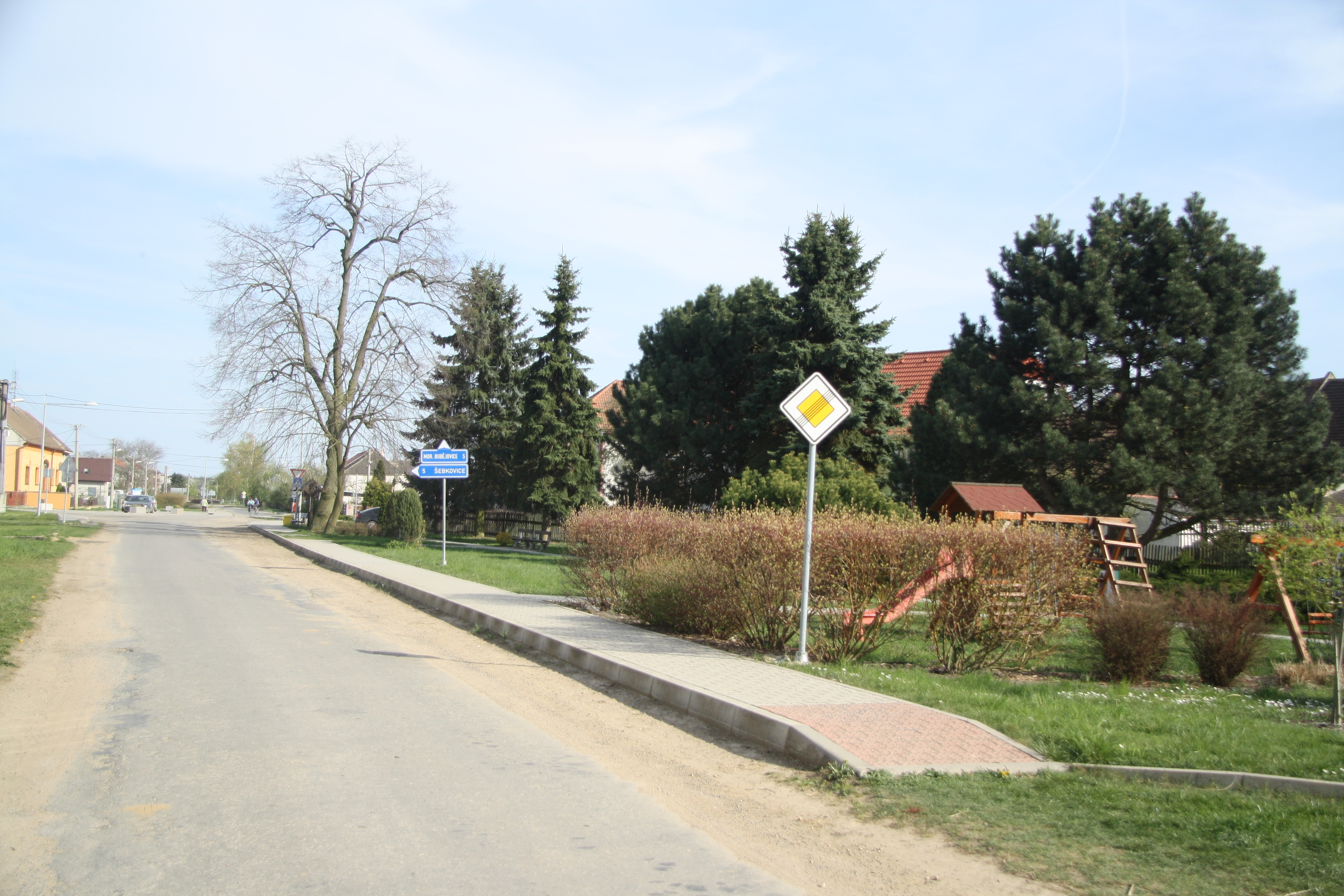
- Centre of Vícenice

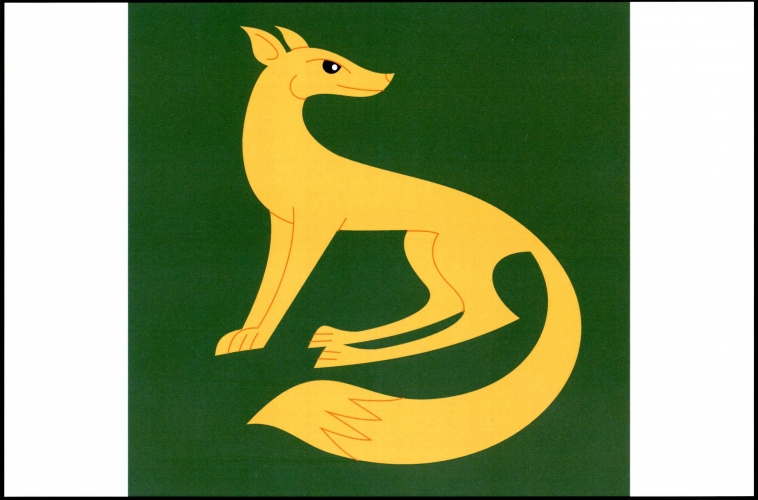
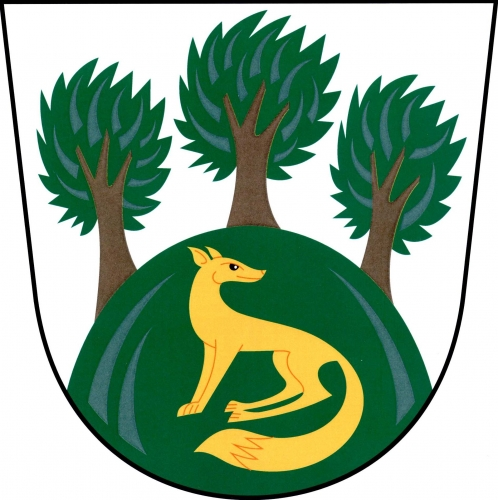
- Flag Coat of arms

- Location in the Czech Republic
- Coordinates: 49°5′21″N 15°48′44″E
- Country: Czech Republic
- Region: Vysočina
- District: Třebíč
- First mentioned: 1278

Area
  - Total: 4.48 km^{2} (1.73 sq mi)
- Elevation: 459 m (1,506 ft)

Population (2026-01-01)
  - Total: 199
  - Density: 44.4/km^{2} (115/sq mi)
- Time zone: UTC+1 (CET)
  - Summer (DST): UTC+2 (CEST)
- Postal code: 676 02
- Website: www.vicenice.cz

Vícenice is a municipality and village in Třebíč District in the Vysočina Region of the Czech Republic. It has about 200 inhabitants.

Vícenice lies approximately 16 kilometres (10 mi) south of Třebíč, 38 km (24 mi) south-east of Jihlava, and 150 km (93 mi) south-east of Prague.

== Demographics ==
Historical population
Year	Pop.	±%
1869	282	—
1880	261	−7.4%
1890	277	+6.1%
1900	231	−16.6%
1910	246	+6.5%
1921	295	+19.9%
1930	252	−14.6%
1950	248	−1.6%
1961	230	−7.3%
1970	223	−3.0%
1980	207	−7.2%
1991	202	−2.4%
2001	187	−7.4%
2011	215	+15.0%
2021	190	−11.6%
Source: Censuses
