= Ostašov =

- Municipality
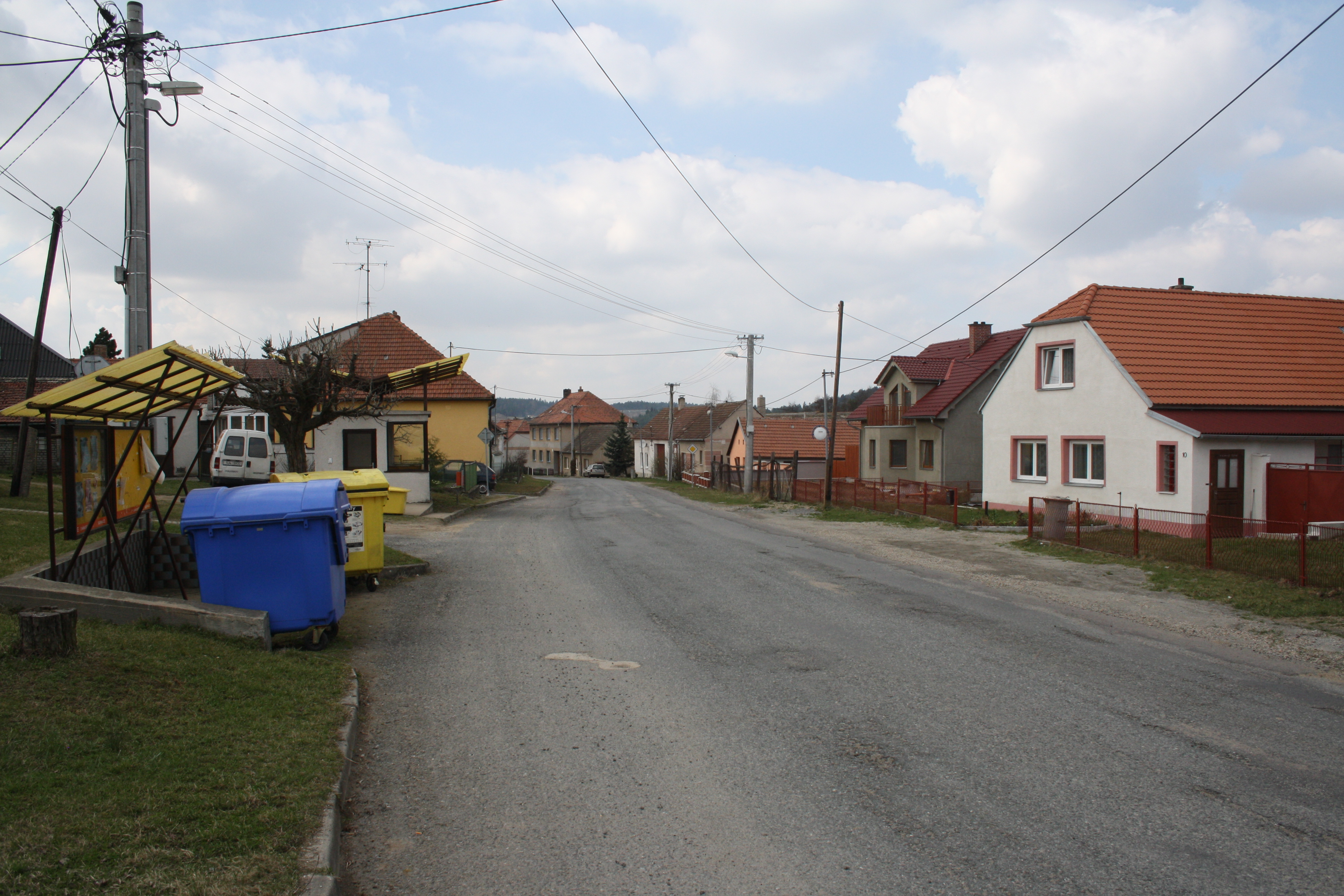
- Centre of Ostašov

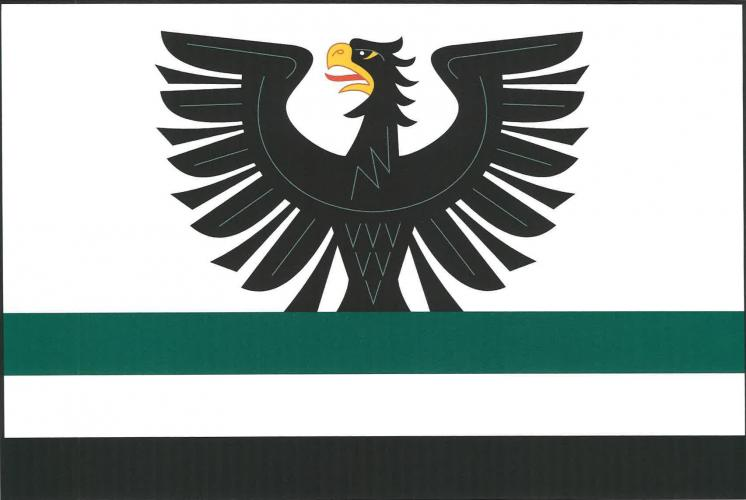
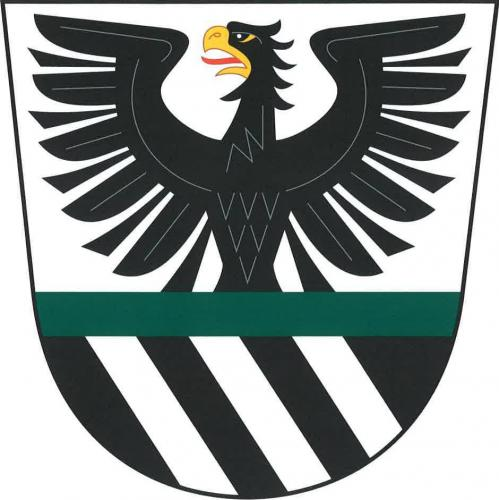
- Flag Coat of arms

- Location in the Czech Republic
- Coordinates: 49°9′20″N 15°55′5″E
- Country: Czech Republic
- Region: Vysočina
- District: Třebíč
- Founded: 1716

Area
  - Total: 2.13 km^{2} (0.82 sq mi)
- Elevation: 516 m (1,693 ft)

Population (2026-01-01)
  - Total: 175
  - Density: 82.2/km^{2} (213/sq mi)
- Time zone: UTC+1 (CET)
  - Summer (DST): UTC+2 (CEST)
- Postal code: 675 52
- Website: www.ostasov.cz

Ostašov is a municipality and village in Třebíč District in the Vysočina Region of the Czech Republic. It has about 200 inhabitants.

Ostašov lies approximately 9 kilometres (6 mi) south-east of Třebíč, 37 km (23 mi) south-east of Jihlava, and 150 km (93 mi) south-east of Prague.

== Demographics ==
Historical population
Year	Pop.	±%
1869	189	—
1880	168	−11.1%
1890	164	−2.4%
1900	176	+7.3%
1910	164	−6.8%
1921	175	+6.7%
1930	184	+5.1%
1950	175	−4.9%
1961	185	+5.7%
1970	164	−11.4%
1980	146	−11.0%
1991	140	−4.1%
2001	131	−6.4%
2011	139	+6.1%
2021	157	+12.9%
Source: Censuses
