= Slavíkovice =

- Municipality
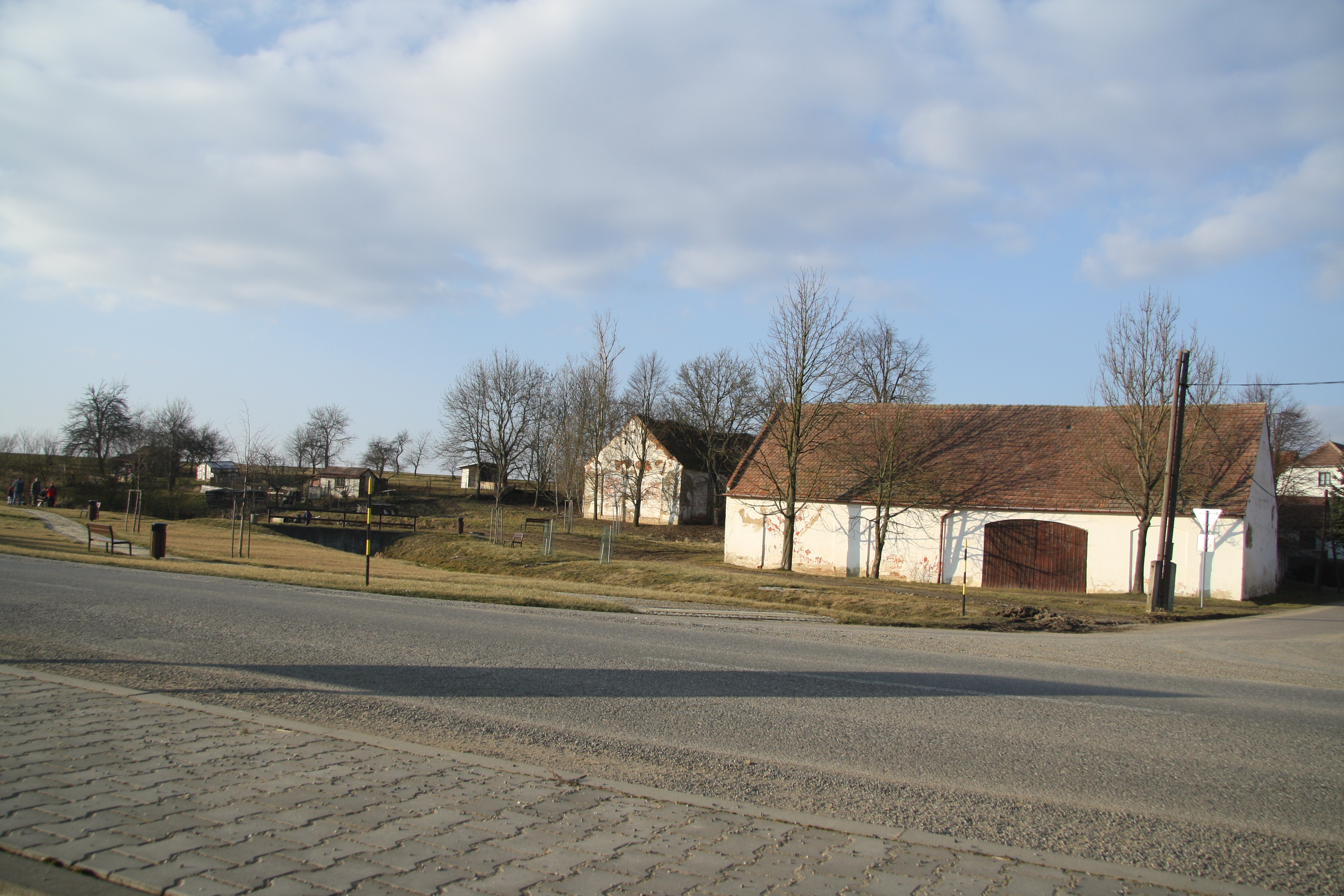
- Centre of Slavíkovice

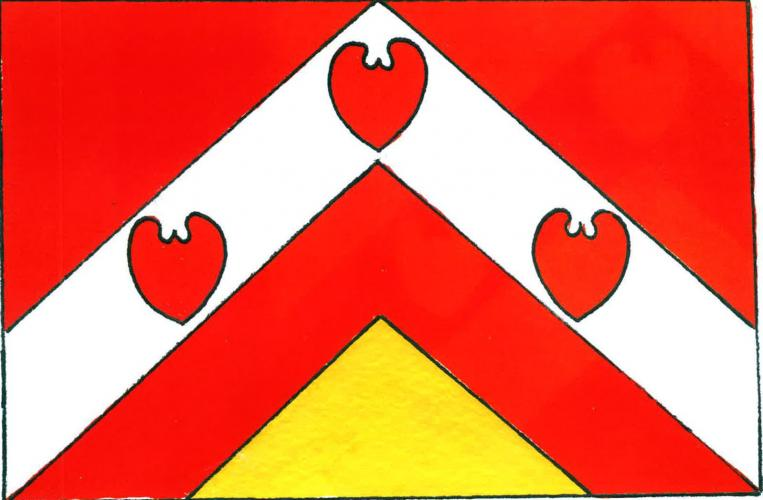
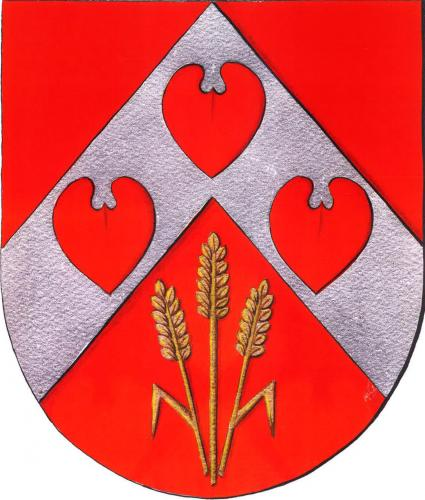
- Flag Coat of arms

- Location in the Czech Republic
- Coordinates: 49°0′16″N 15°37′28″E
- Country: Czech Republic
- Region: Vysočina
- District: Třebíč
- First mentioned: 1350

Area
  - Total: 5.48 km^{2} (2.12 sq mi)
- Elevation: 452 m (1,483 ft)

Population (2026-01-01)
  - Total: 193
  - Density: 35.2/km^{2} (91.2/sq mi)
- Time zone: UTC+1 (CET)
  - Summer (DST): UTC+2 (CEST)
- Postal code: 675 31
- Website: www.slavikovice.cz

Slavíkovice is a municipality and village in Třebíč District in the Vysočina Region of the Czech Republic. It has about 200 inhabitants.

Slavíkovice lies approximately 31 kilometres (19 mi) south-west of Třebíč, 44 km (27 mi) south of Jihlava, and 149 km (93 mi) south-east of Prague.

== Demographics ==
Historical population
Year	Pop.	±%
1869	271	—
1880	320	+18.1%
1890	354	+10.6%
1900	354	+0.0%
1910	353	−0.3%
1921	340	−3.7%
1930	389	+14.4%
1950	302	−22.4%
1961	323	+7.0%
1970	293	−9.3%
1980	273	−6.8%
1991	230	−15.8%
2001	228	−0.9%
2011	213	−6.6%
2021	183	−14.1%
Source: Censuses
