= Stropešín =

- Municipality
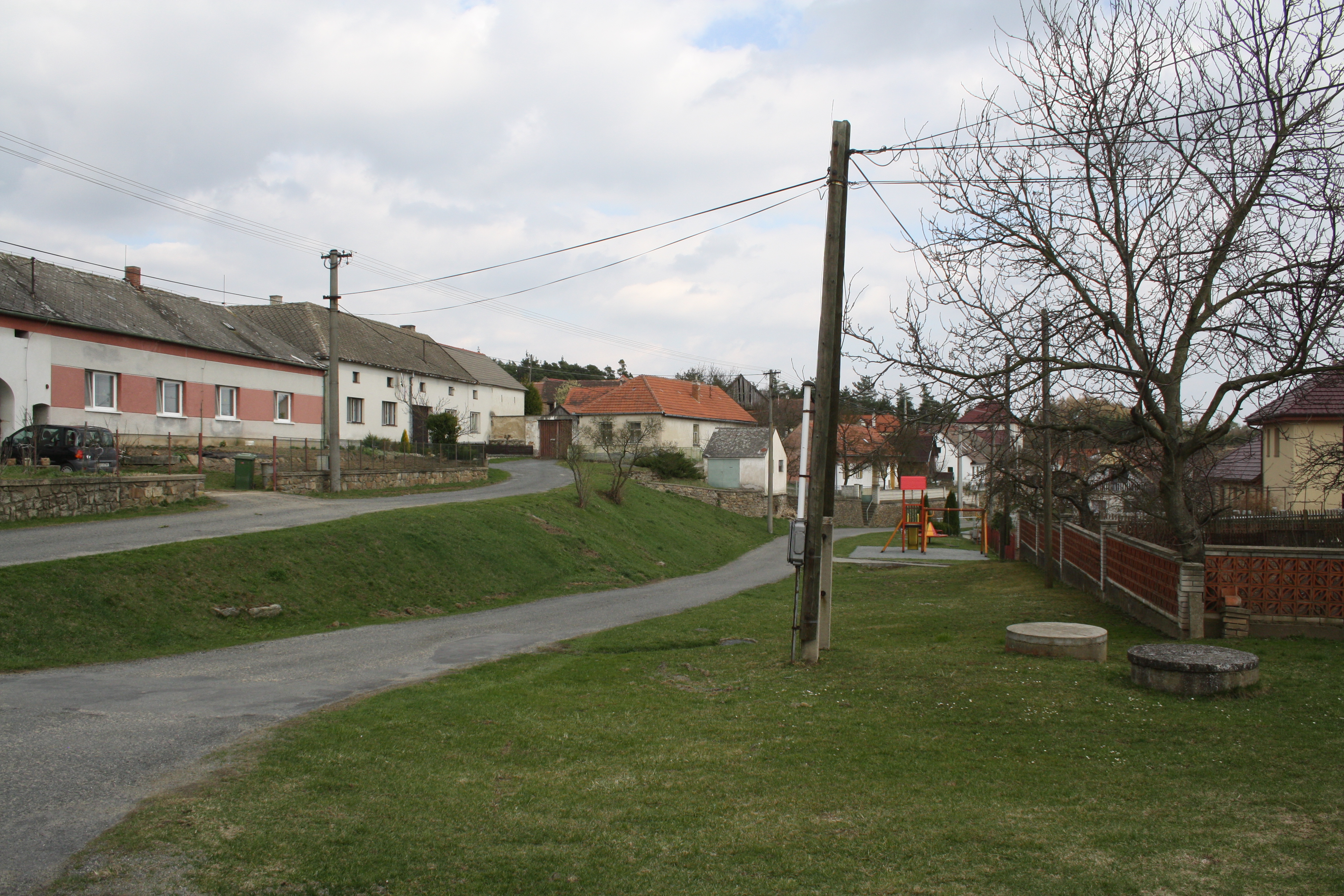
- Centre of Stropešín

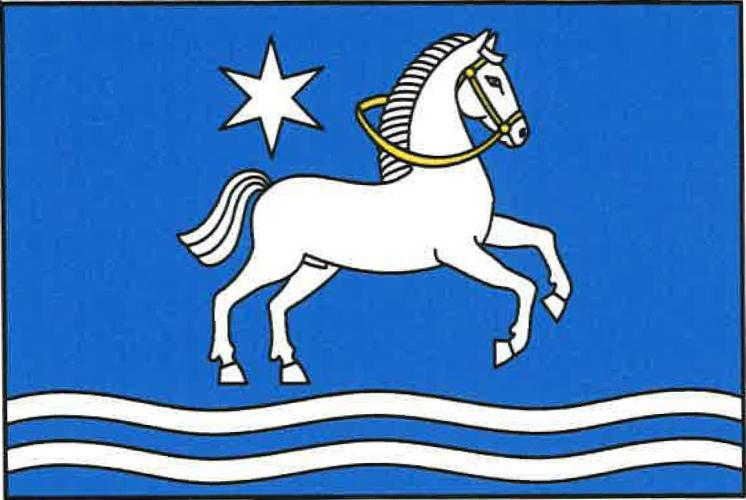
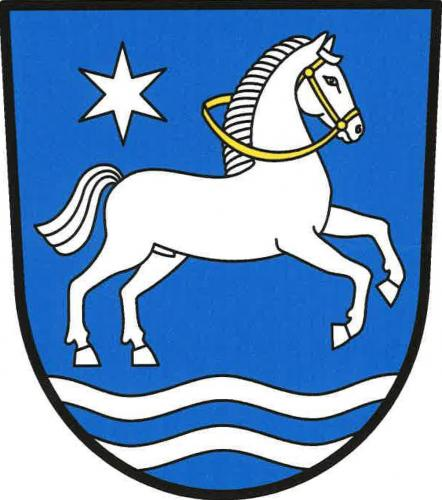
- Flag Coat of arms

- Location in the Czech Republic
- Coordinates: 49°9′15″N 16°4′38″E
- Country: Czech Republic
- Region: Vysočina
- District: Třebíč
- First mentioned: 1125

Area
  - Total: 6.90 km^{2} (2.66 sq mi)
- Elevation: 438 m (1,437 ft)

Population (2026-01-01)
  - Total: 128
  - Density: 18.6/km^{2} (48.0/sq mi)
- Time zone: UTC+1 (CET)
  - Summer (DST): UTC+2 (CEST)
- Postal code: 675 55
- Website: www.stropesin.cz

Stropešín is a municipality and village in Třebíč District in the Vysočina Region of the Czech Republic. It has about 100 inhabitants.

Stropešín lies approximately 17 kilometres (11 mi) south-east of Třebíč, 45 km (28 mi) south-east of Jihlava, and 159 km (99 mi) south-east of Prague.

== Demographics ==
Historical population
Year	Pop.	±%
1869	211	—
1880	200	−5.2%
1890	240	+20.0%
1900	244	+1.7%
1910	244	+0.0%
1921	238	−2.5%
1930	261	+9.7%
1950	199	−23.8%
1961	225	+13.1%
1970	193	−14.2%
1980	162	−16.1%
1991	143	−11.7%
2001	125	−12.6%
2011	116	−7.2%
2021	123	+6.0%
Source: Censuses
