= Lhotice =

- Municipality
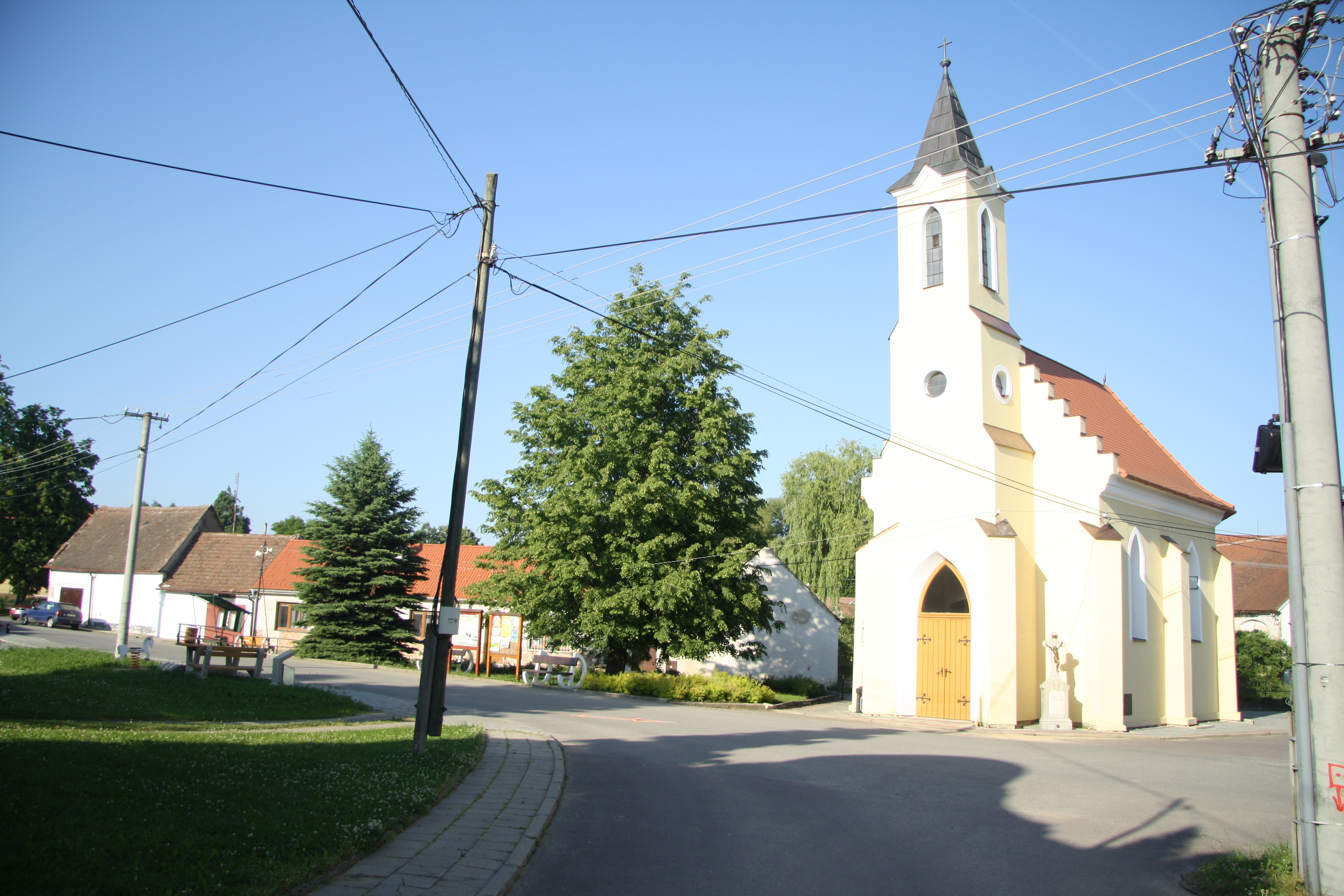
- Centre of Lhotice

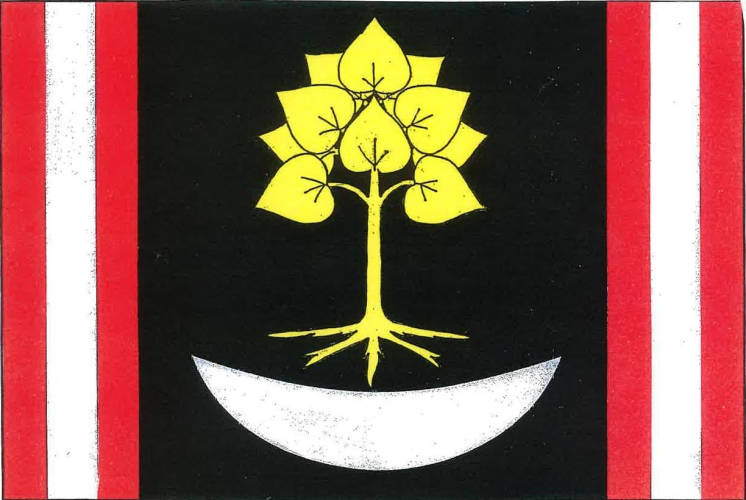
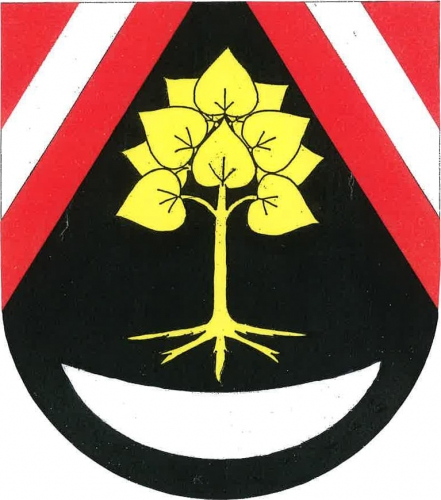
- Flag Coat of arms

- Location in the Czech Republic
- Coordinates: 49°1′10″N 15°36′25″E
- Country: Czech Republic
- Region: Vysočina
- District: Třebíč
- First mentioned: 1361

Area
  - Total: 2.80 km^{2} (1.08 sq mi)
- Elevation: 464 m (1,522 ft)

Population (2026-01-01)
  - Total: 153
  - Density: 54.6/km^{2} (142/sq mi)
- Time zone: UTC+1 (CET)
  - Summer (DST): UTC+2 (CEST)
- Postal code: 675 31
- Website: www.obeclhotice.cz

Lhotice is a municipality and village in Třebíč District in the Vysočina Region of the Czech Republic. It has about 200 inhabitants.

Lhotice lies approximately 30 kilometres (19 mi) south-west of Třebíč, 42 km (26 mi) south of Jihlava, and 146 km (91 mi) south-east of Prague.

== Demographics ==
Historical population
Year	Pop.	±%
1869	229	—
1880	220	−3.9%
1890	233	+5.9%
1900	249	+6.9%
1910	261	+4.8%
1921	271	+3.8%
1930	251	−7.4%
1950	193	−23.1%
1961	196	+1.6%
1970	172	−12.2%
1980	192	+11.6%
1991	169	−12.0%
2001	156	−7.7%
2011	167	+7.1%
2021	149	−10.8%
Source: Censuses
