= Horní Smrčné =

- Municipality
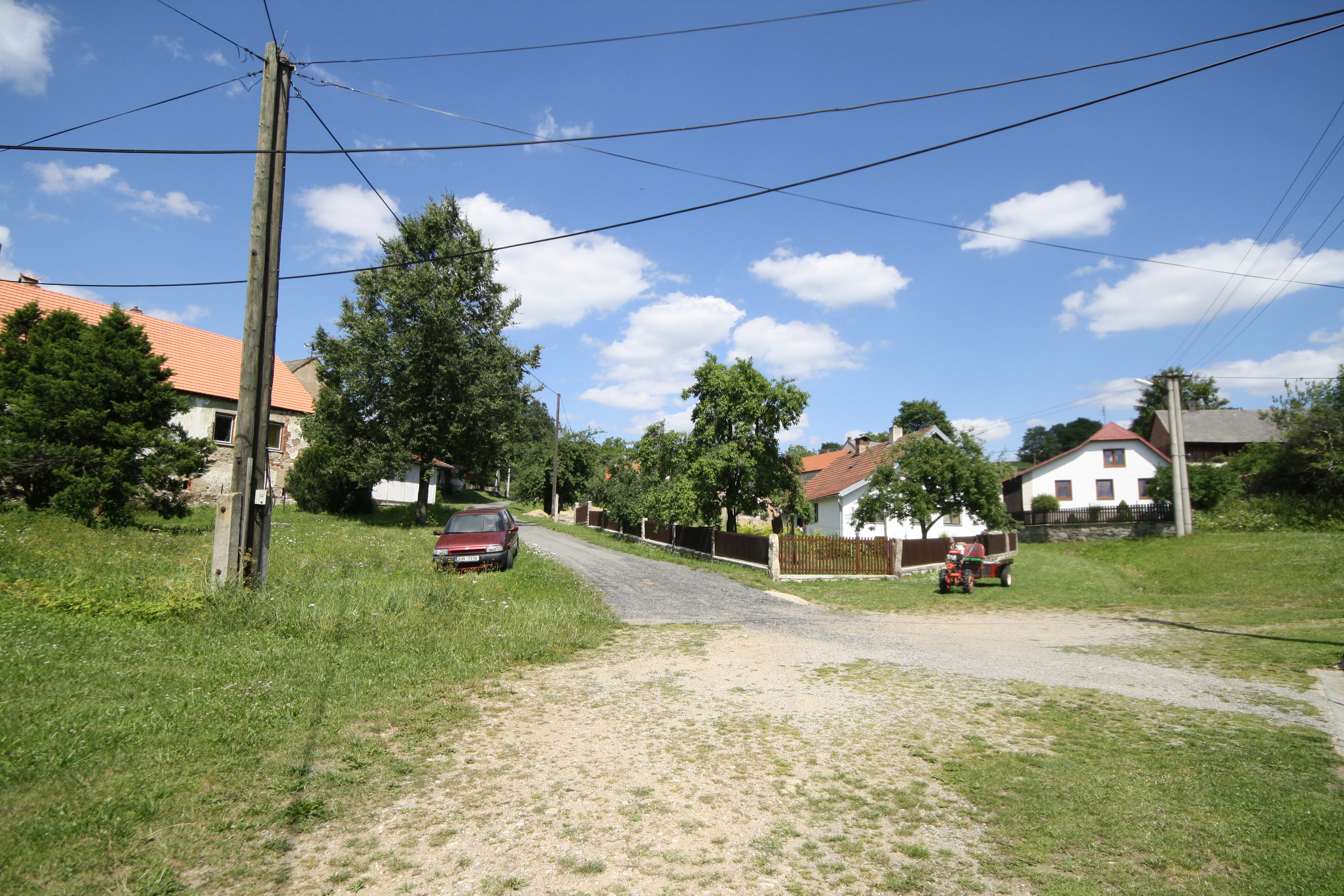
- Centre of Horní Smrčné

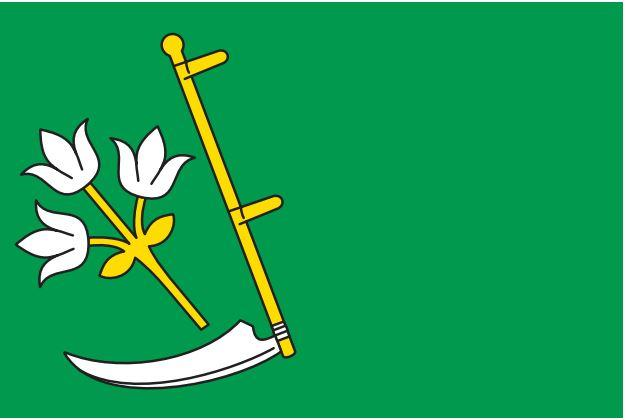
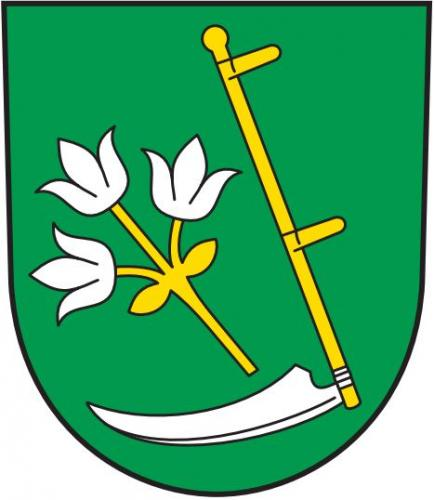
- Flag Coat of arms

- Location in the Czech Republic
- Coordinates: 49°19′43″N 15°45′22″E
- Country: Czech Republic
- Region: Vysočina
- District: Třebíč
- First mentioned: 1556

Area
  - Total: 3.33 km^{2} (1.29 sq mi)
- Elevation: 520 m (1,710 ft)

Population (2026-01-01)
  - Total: 55
  - Density: 17/km^{2} (43/sq mi)
- Time zone: UTC+1 (CET)
  - Summer (DST): UTC+2 (CEST)
- Postal code: 675 07
- Website: www.hornismrcne.cz

Horní Smrčné is a municipality and village in Třebíč District in the Vysočina Region of the Czech Republic. It has about 60 inhabitants.

Horní Smrčné lies approximately 16 kilometres (10 mi) north-west of Třebíč, 15 km (9 mi) south-east of Jihlava, and 128 km (80 mi) south-east of Prague.

== Demographics ==
Historical population
Year	Pop.	±%
1869	68	—
1880	72	+5.9%
1890	68	−5.6%
1900	75	+10.3%
1910	86	+14.7%
1921	93	+8.1%
1930	116	+24.7%
1950	84	−27.6%
1961	63	−25.0%
1970	63	+0.0%
1980	68	+7.9%
1991	53	−22.1%
2001	51	−3.8%
2011	49	−3.9%
2021	50	+2.0%
Source: Censuses
