= Bačice =

- Municipality
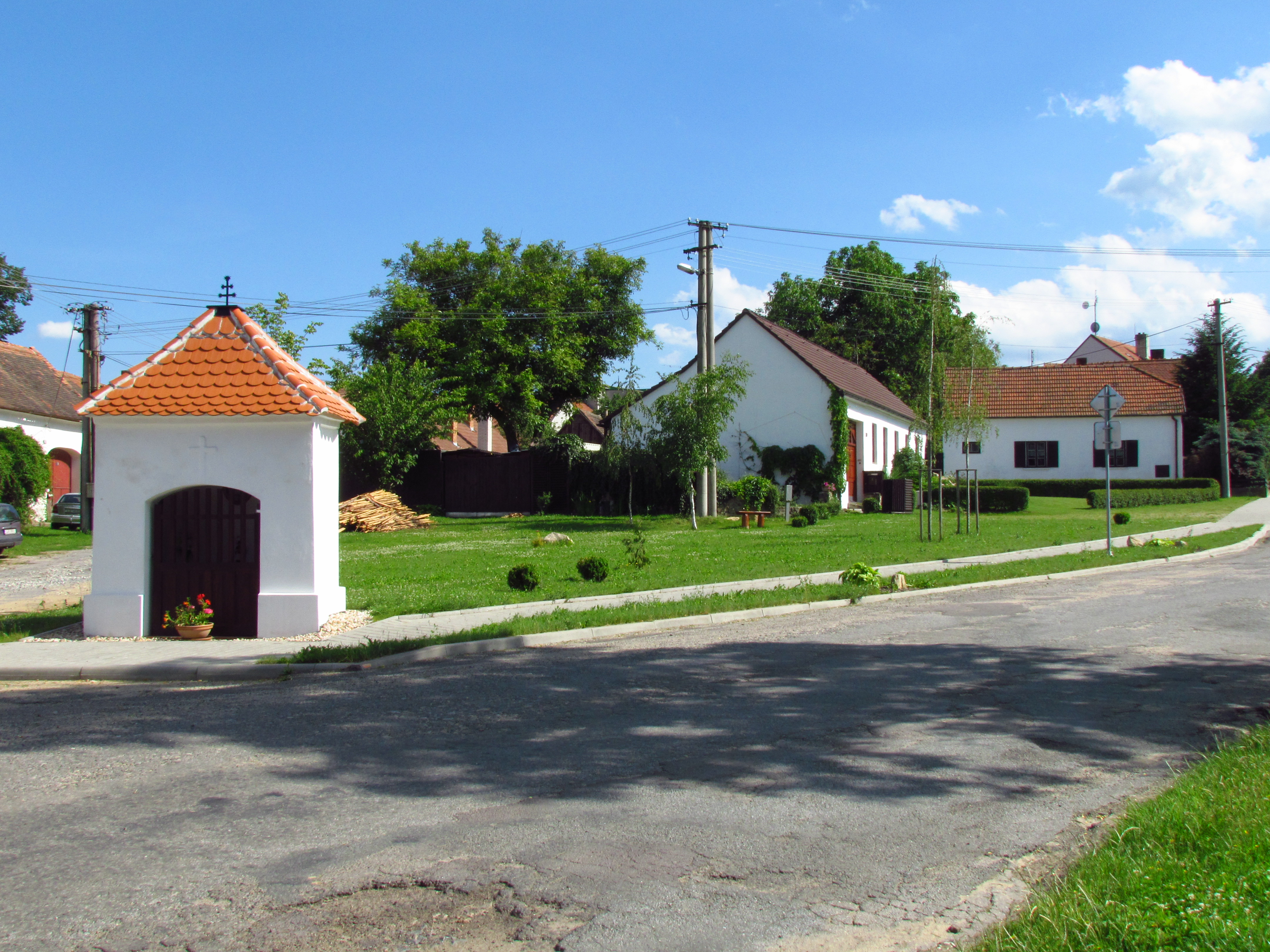
- Centre of Bačice

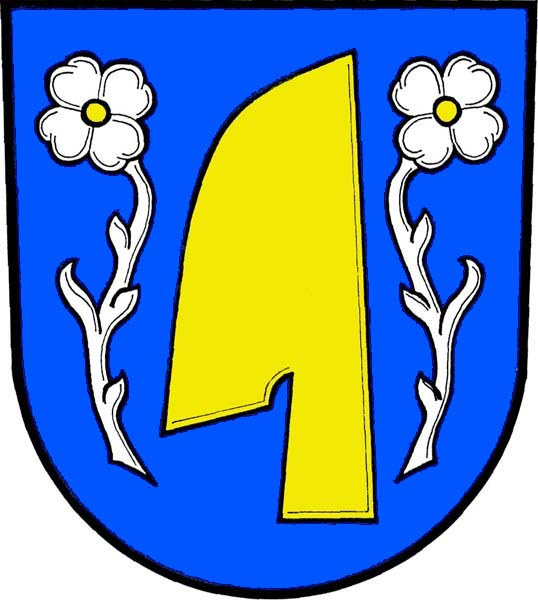
- Flag Coat of arms

- Location in the Czech Republic
- Coordinates: 49°5′2″N 16°1′39″E
- Country: Czech Republic
- Region: Vysočina
- District: Třebíč
- First mentioned: 1307

Area
  - Total: 5.33 km^{2} (2.06 sq mi)
- Elevation: 425 m (1,394 ft)

Population (2026-01-01)
  - Total: 203
  - Density: 38.1/km^{2} (98.6/sq mi)
- Time zone: UTC+1 (CET)
  - Summer (DST): UTC+2 (CEST)
- Postal code: 675 55
- Website: www.bacice.cz

Bačice is a municipality and village in Třebíč District in the Vysočina Region of the Czech Republic. It has about 200 inhabitants.

Bačice lies approximately 18 kilometres (11 mi) south-east of Třebíč, 47 km (29 mi) south-east of Jihlava, and 161 km (100 mi) south-east of Prague.

== Administrative division ==
Bačice consists of two municipal parts (in brackets population according to the 2021 census):

- Bačice (124)
- Udeřice (73)

== Demographics ==
Historical population
Year	Pop.	±%
1869	370	—
1880	364	−1.6%
1890	353	−3.0%
1900	350	−0.8%
1910	353	+0.9%
1921	366	+3.7%
1930	384	+4.9%
1950	343	−10.7%
1961	346	+0.9%
1970	301	−13.0%
1980	276	−8.3%
1991	231	−16.3%
2001	202	−12.6%
2011	194	−4.0%
2021	197	+1.5%
Source: Censuses
