= Krahulov =

- Municipality
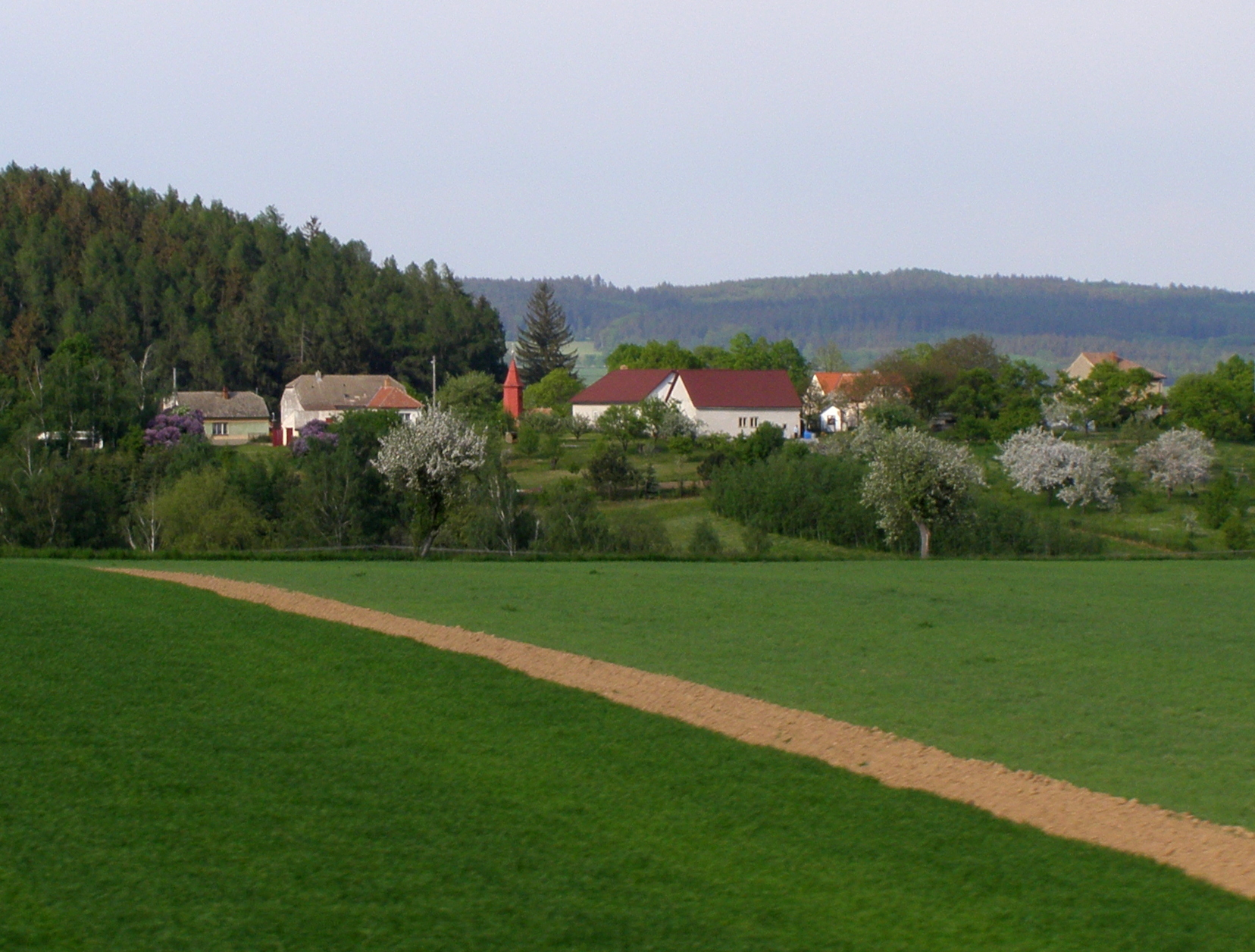
- View from the west

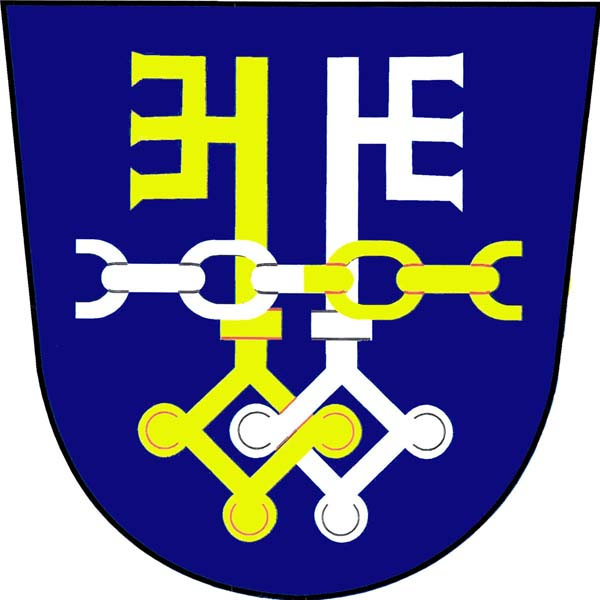
- Flag Coat of arms

- Location in the Czech Republic
- Coordinates: 49°13′23″N 15°48′29″E
- Country: Czech Republic
- Region: Vysočina
- District: Třebíč
- First mentioned: 1307

Area
  - Total: 4.88 km^{2} (1.88 sq mi)
- Elevation: 467 m (1,532 ft)

Population (2026-01-01)
  - Total: 297
  - Density: 60.9/km^{2} (158/sq mi)
- Time zone: UTC+1 (CET)
  - Summer (DST): UTC+2 (CEST)
- Postal code: 675 21
- Website: www.krahulov.cz

Krahulov is a municipality and village in Třebíč District in the Vysočina Region of the Czech Republic. It has about 300 inhabitants.

Krahulov lies approximately 6 kilometres (4 mi) west of Třebíč, 25 km (16 mi) south-east of Jihlava, and 139 km (86 mi) south-east of Prague.

== Demographics ==
Historical population
Year	Pop.	±%
1869	281	—
1880	265	−5.7%
1890	290	+9.4%
1900	312	+7.6%
1910	305	−2.2%
1921	293	−3.9%
1930	353	+20.5%
1950	332	−5.9%
1961	317	−4.5%
1970	289	−8.8%
1980	257	−11.1%
1991	232	−9.7%
2001	233	+0.4%
2011	232	−0.4%
2021	274	+18.1%
Source: Censuses
