= Domamil =

- Municipality
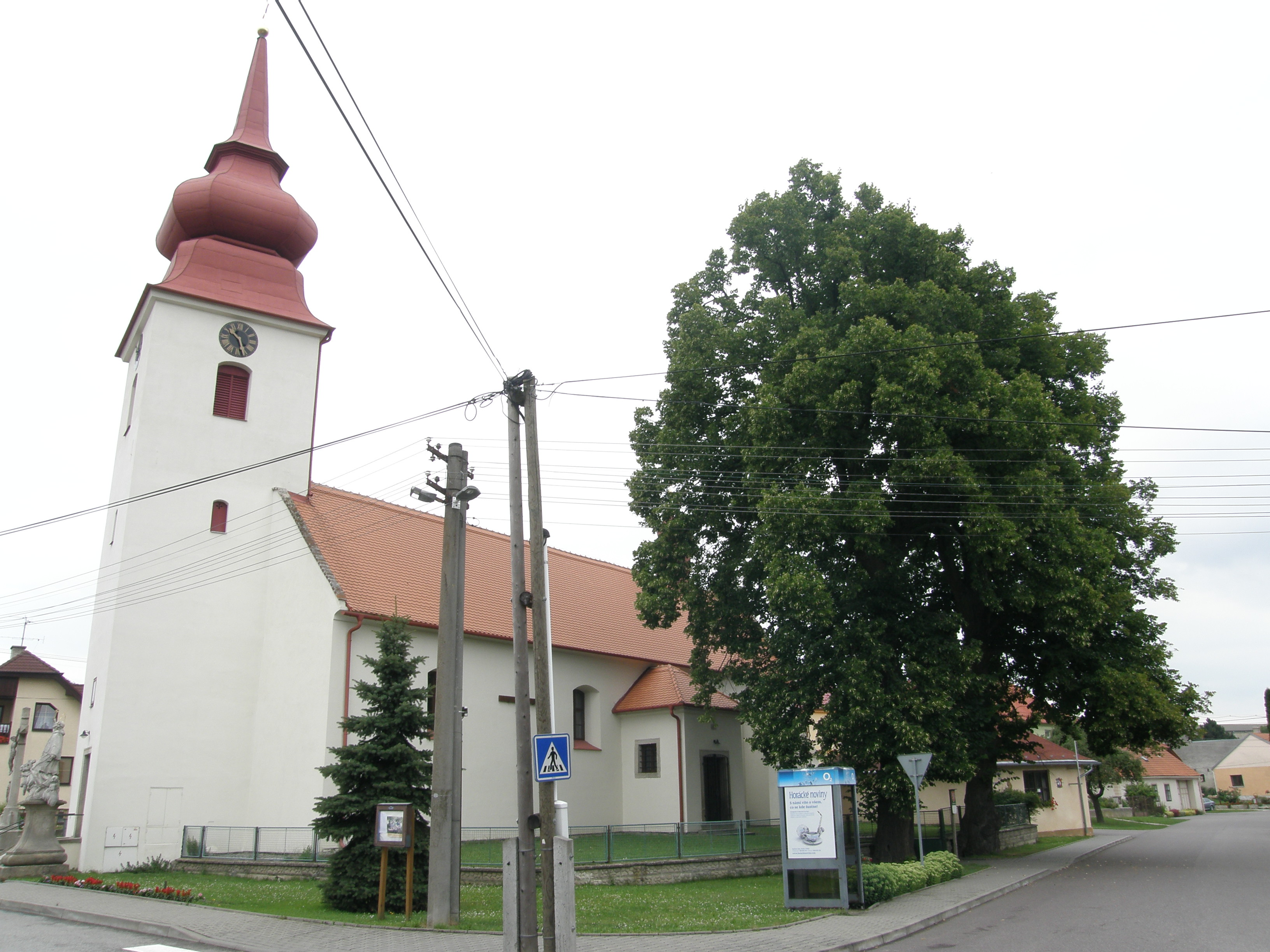
- Church of Saint Procopius

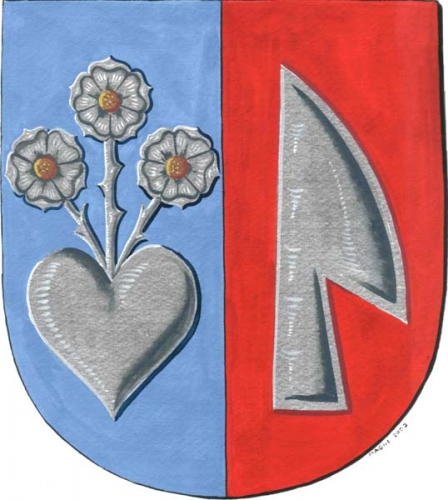
- Flag Coat of arms

- Location in the Czech Republic
- Coordinates: 49°5′0″N 15°41′44″E
- Country: Czech Republic
- Region: Vysočina
- District: Třebíč
- First mentioned: 1190

Area
  - Total: 10.95 km^{2} (4.23 sq mi)
- Elevation: 495 m (1,624 ft)

Population (2026-01-01)
  - Total: 313
  - Density: 28.6/km^{2} (74.0/sq mi)
- Time zone: UTC+1 (CET)
  - Summer (DST): UTC+2 (CEST)
- Postal code: 675 43
- Website: www.domamil.eu

Domamil is a municipality and village in Třebíč District in the Vysočina Region of the Czech Republic. It has about 300 inhabitants.

Domamil lies approximately 21 kilometres (13 mi) south-west of Třebíč, 36 km (22 mi) south of Jihlava, and 145 km (90 mi) south-east of Prague.

== Demographics ==
Historical population
| Year | Pop. | ±% |
|---|---|---|
| 1869 | 591 | — |
| 1880 | 575 | −2.7% |
| 1890 | 557 | −3.1% |
| 1900 | 526 | −5.6% |
| 1910 | 518 | −1.5% |
| 1921 | 530 | +2.3% |
| 1930 | 484 | −8.7% |
| 1950 | 413 | −14.7% |
| 1961 | 422 | +2.2% |
| 1970 | 353 | −16.4% |
| 1980 | 347 | −1.7% |
| 1991 | 297 | −14.4% |
| 2001 | 272 | −8.4% |
| 2011 | 295 | +8.5% |
| 2021 | 318 | +7.8% |
Source: Censuses
