= Jinošov =

- Municipality
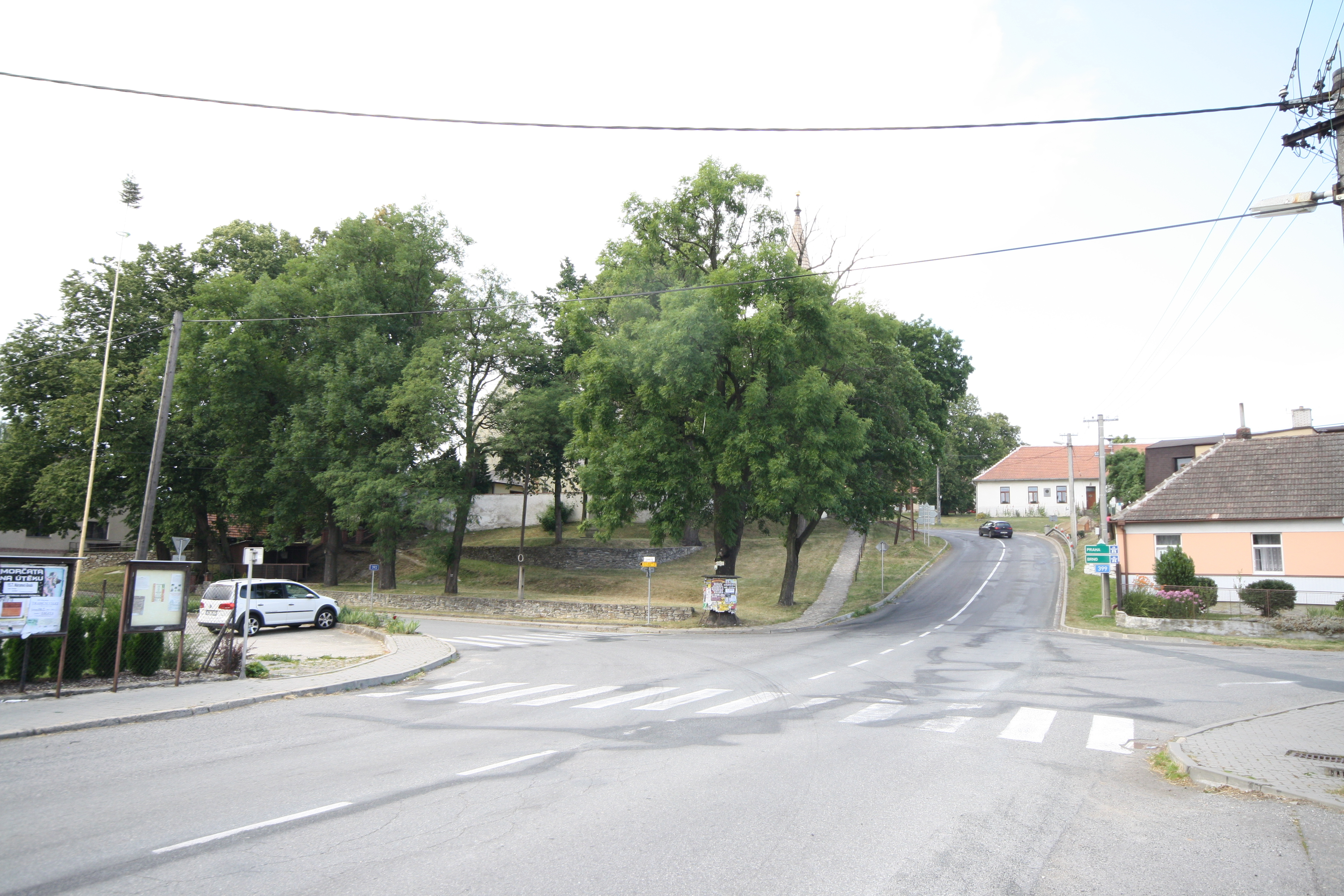
- Centre of Jinošov

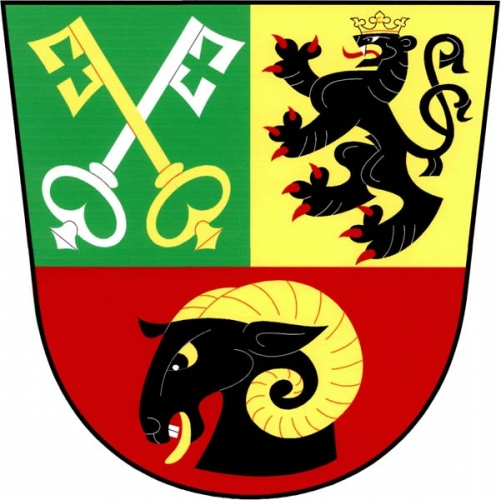
- Flag Coat of arms

- Location in the Czech Republic
- Coordinates: 49°13′53″N 16°11′36″E
- Country: Czech Republic
- Region: Vysočina
- District: Třebíč
- First mentioned: 1349

Area
  - Total: 5.10 km^{2} (1.97 sq mi)
- Elevation: 473 m (1,552 ft)

Population (2026-01-01)
  - Total: 278
  - Density: 54.5/km^{2} (141/sq mi)
- Time zone: UTC+1 (CET)
  - Summer (DST): UTC+2 (CEST)
- Postal code: 675 71
- Website: jinosov.cz

Jinošov (German: Jeneschau) is a municipality and village in Třebíč District in the Vysočina Region of the Czech Republic. It has about 300 inhabitants.

Jinošov lies approximately 23 kilometres (14 mi) east of Třebíč, 48 km (30 mi) south-east of Jihlava, and 159 km (99 mi) south-east of Prague.

== History ==
The first written mention of Jinošov is from 1349.

== Demographics ==
Historical population
Year	Pop.	±%
1869	311	—
1880	324	+4.2%
1890	368	+13.6%
1900	297	−19.3%
1910	312	+5.1%
1921	305	−2.2%
1930	293	−3.9%
1950	345	+17.7%
1961	371	+7.5%
1970	339	−8.6%
1980	357	+5.3%
1991	324	−9.2%
2001	322	−0.6%
2011	241	−25.2%
2021	228	−5.4%
Source: Censuses
