= Štěpkov =

- Municipality
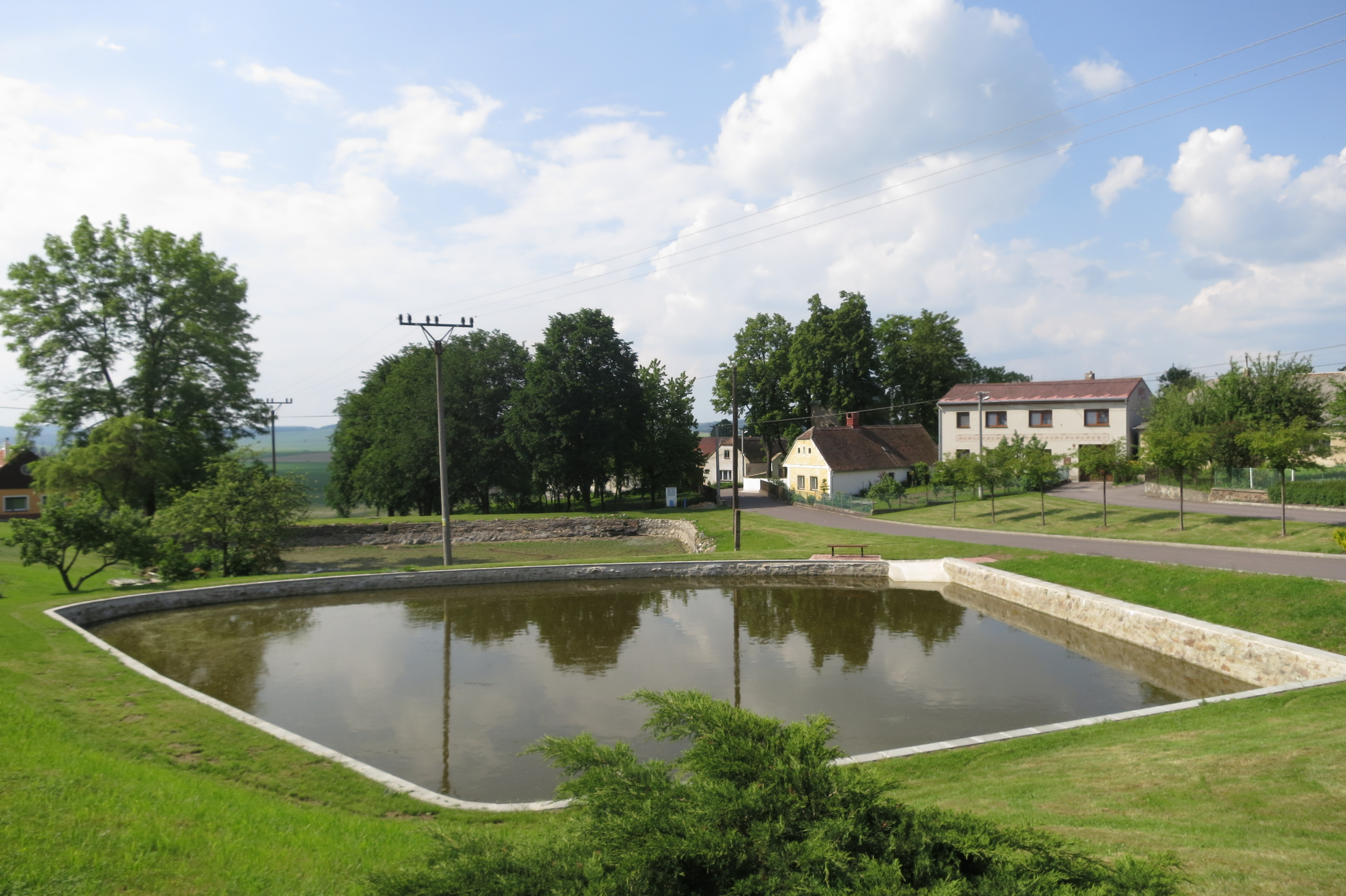
- Centre of Štěpkov

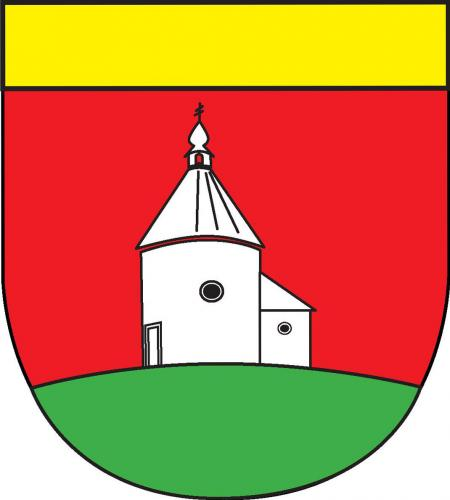
- Flag Coat of arms

- Location in the Czech Republic
- Coordinates: 49°5′3″N 15°39′0″E
- Country: Czech Republic
- Region: Vysočina
- District: Třebíč
- First mentioned: 1351

Area
  - Total: 3.93 km^{2} (1.52 sq mi)
- Elevation: 565 m (1,854 ft)

Population (2026-01-01)
  - Total: 116
  - Density: 29.5/km^{2} (76.4/sq mi)
- Time zone: UTC+1 (CET)
  - Summer (DST): UTC+2 (CEST)
- Postal code: 675 26
- Website: www.stepkov.cz

Štěpkov is a municipality and village in Třebíč District in the Vysočina Region of the Czech Republic. It has about 100 inhabitants.

Štěpkov lies approximately 23 kilometres (14 mi) south-west of Třebíč, 36 km (22 mi) south of Jihlava, and 143 km (89 mi) south-east of Prague.

== Demographics ==
Historical population
Year	Pop.	±%
1869	222	—
1880	245	+10.4%
1890	229	−6.5%
1900	234	+2.2%
1910	243	+3.8%
1921	234	−3.7%
1930	254	+8.5%
1950	181	−28.7%
1961	173	−4.4%
1970	149	−13.9%
1980	142	−4.7%
1991	128	−9.9%
2001	114	−10.9%
2011	114	+0.0%
2021	113	−0.9%
Source: Censuses
