= Předín =

- Municipality
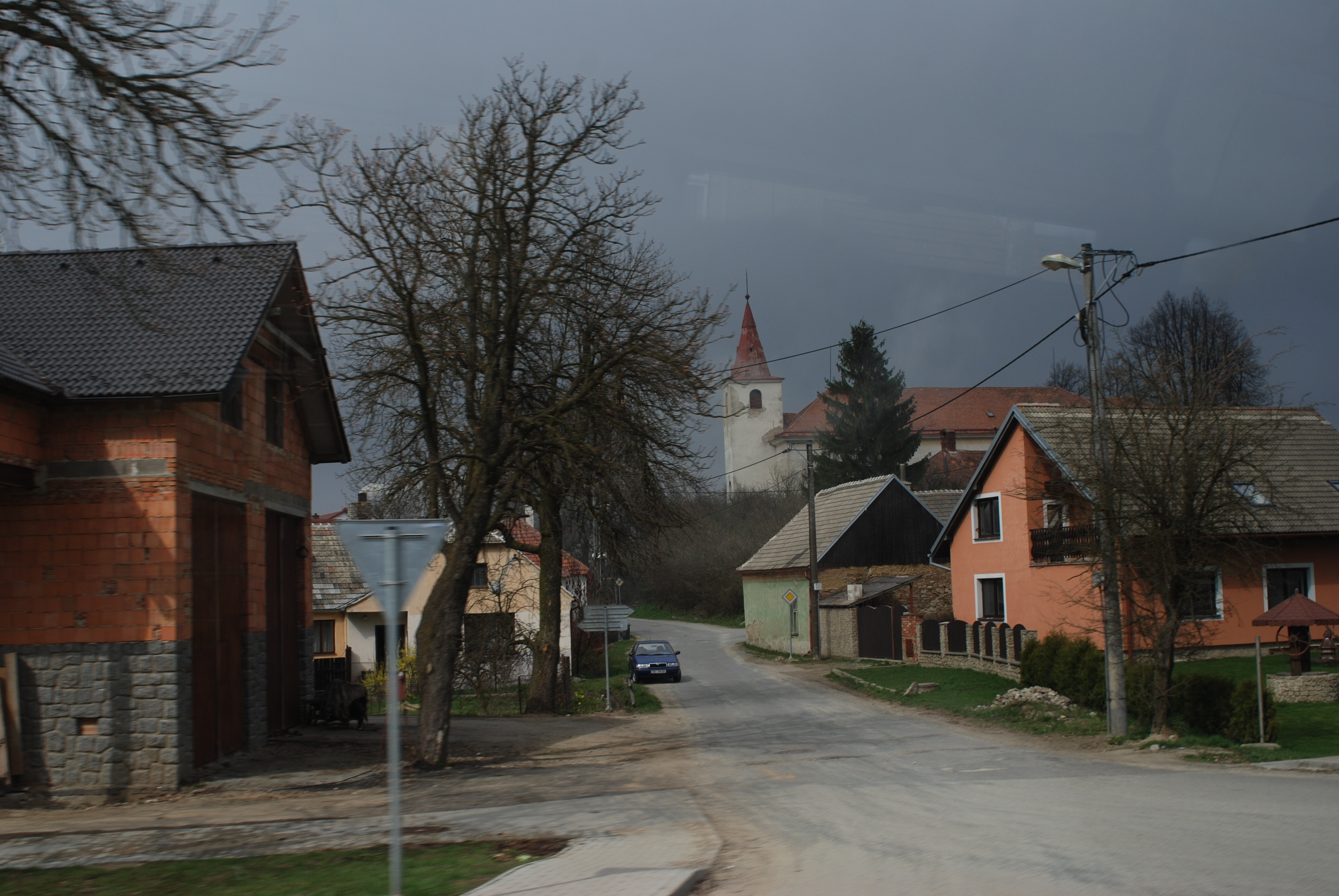
- View towards the Church of Saint Wenceslaus

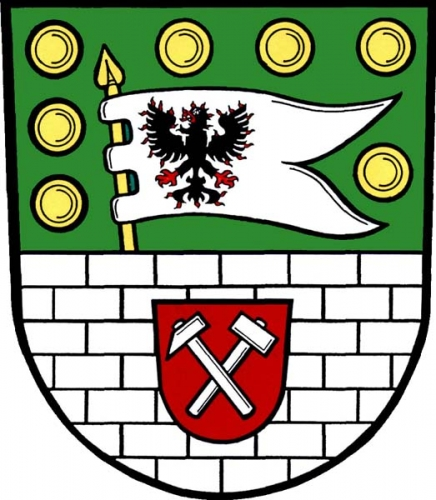
- Flag Coat of arms

- Location in the Czech Republic
- Coordinates: 49°11′54″N 15°40′25″E
- Country: Czech Republic
- Region: Vysočina
- District: Třebíč
- First mentioned: 1353

Area
  - Total: 15.11 km^{2} (5.83 sq mi)
- Elevation: 618 m (2,028 ft)

Population (2026-01-01)
  - Total: 674
  - Density: 44.6/km^{2} (116/sq mi)
- Time zone: UTC+1 (CET)
  - Summer (DST): UTC+2 (CEST)
- Postal code: 675 27
- Website: www.predin.cz

Předín is a municipality and village in Třebíč District in the Vysočina Region of the Czech Republic. It has about 700 inhabitants.

Předín lies approximately 15 kilometres (9 mi) west of Třebíč, 23 km (14 mi) south of Jihlava, and 135 km (84 mi) south-east of Prague.

== Administrative division ==
Předín consists of two municipal parts (in brackets population according to the 2021 census):

- Předín (614)
- Hory (38)

== Demographics ==
Historical population
Year	Pop.	±%
1869	841	—
1880	921	+9.5%
1890	893	−3.0%
1900	884	−1.0%
1910	957	+8.3%
1921	1,035	+8.2%
1930	994	−4.0%
1950	929	−6.5%
1961	939	+1.1%
1970	858	−8.6%
1980	798	−7.0%
1991	684	−14.3%
2001	679	−0.7%
2011	668	−1.6%
2021	652	−2.4%
Source: Censuses
