= Odunec =

- Municipality
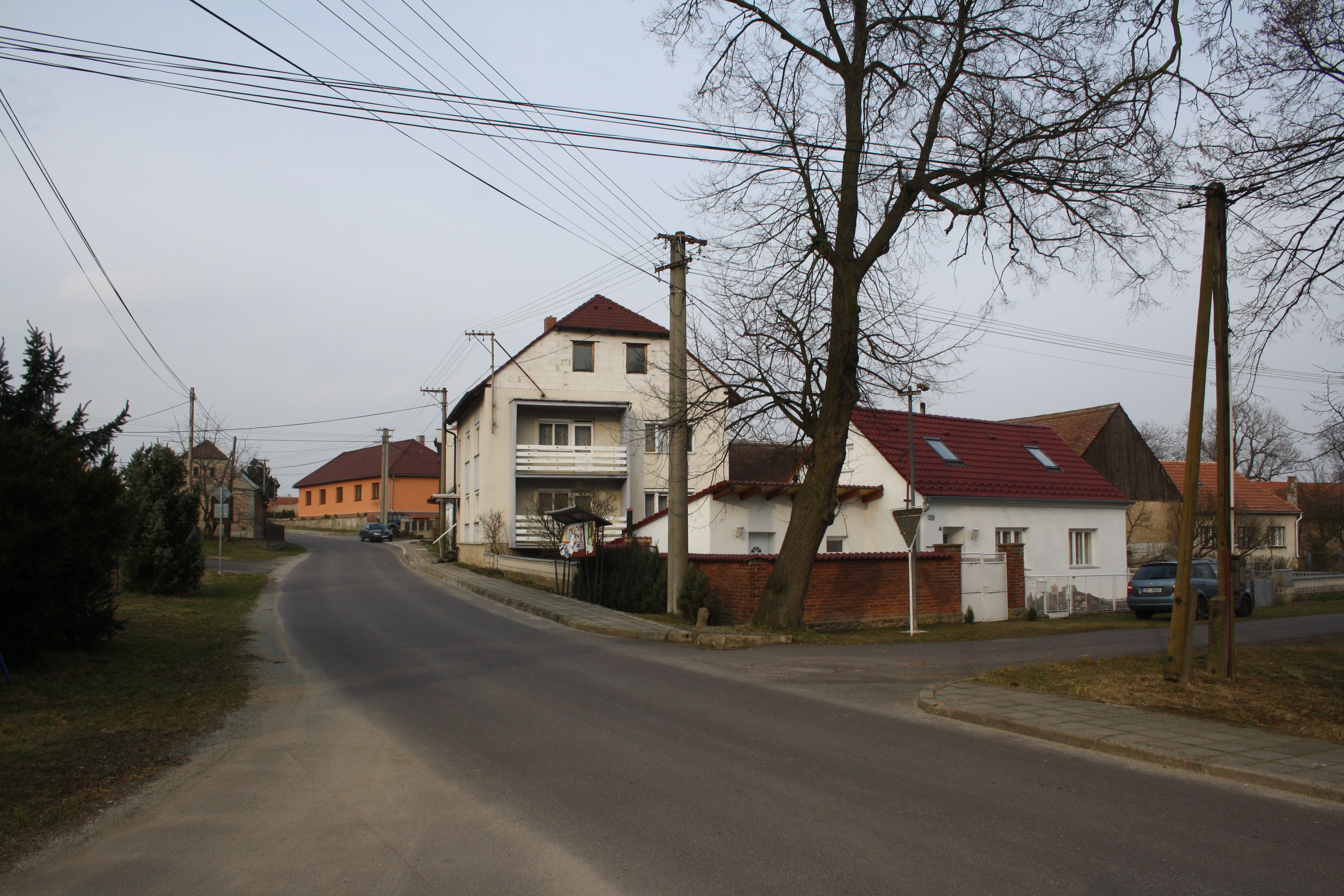
- Centre of Odunec

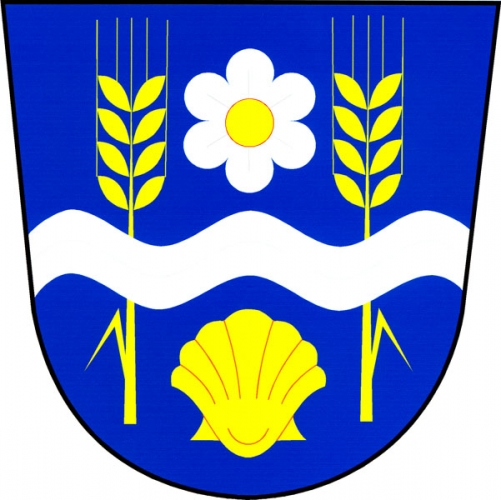
- Flag Coat of arms

- Location in the Czech Republic
- Coordinates: 49°7′13″N 16°0′51″E
- Country: Czech Republic
- Region: Vysočina
- District: Třebíč
- First mentioned: 1278

Area
  - Total: 5.98 km^{2} (2.31 sq mi)
- Elevation: 458 m (1,503 ft)

Population (2026-01-01)
  - Total: 94
  - Density: 16/km^{2} (41/sq mi)
- Time zone: UTC+1 (CET)
  - Summer (DST): UTC+2 (CEST)
- Postal code: 675 55
- Website: www.hrotovicko.cz/odunec/

Odunec is a municipality and village in Třebíč District in the Vysočina Region of the Czech Republic. It has about 90 inhabitants.

Odunec lies south-east of Třebíč (14 kilometres (9 mi) away), Jihlava (43 km (27 mi) away) and the capital Prague (157 km (98 mi) away).

== Demographics ==
Historical population
Year	Pop.	±%
1869	175	—
1880	161	−8.0%
1890	163	+1.2%
1900	181	+11.0%
1910	224	+23.8%
1921	274	+22.3%
1930	253	−7.7%
1950	184	−27.3%
1961	210	+14.1%
1970	162	−22.9%
1980	151	−6.8%
1991	121	−19.9%
2001	97	−19.8%
2011	97	+0.0%
2021	101	+4.1%
Source: Censuses
