= Jiratice =

- Municipality
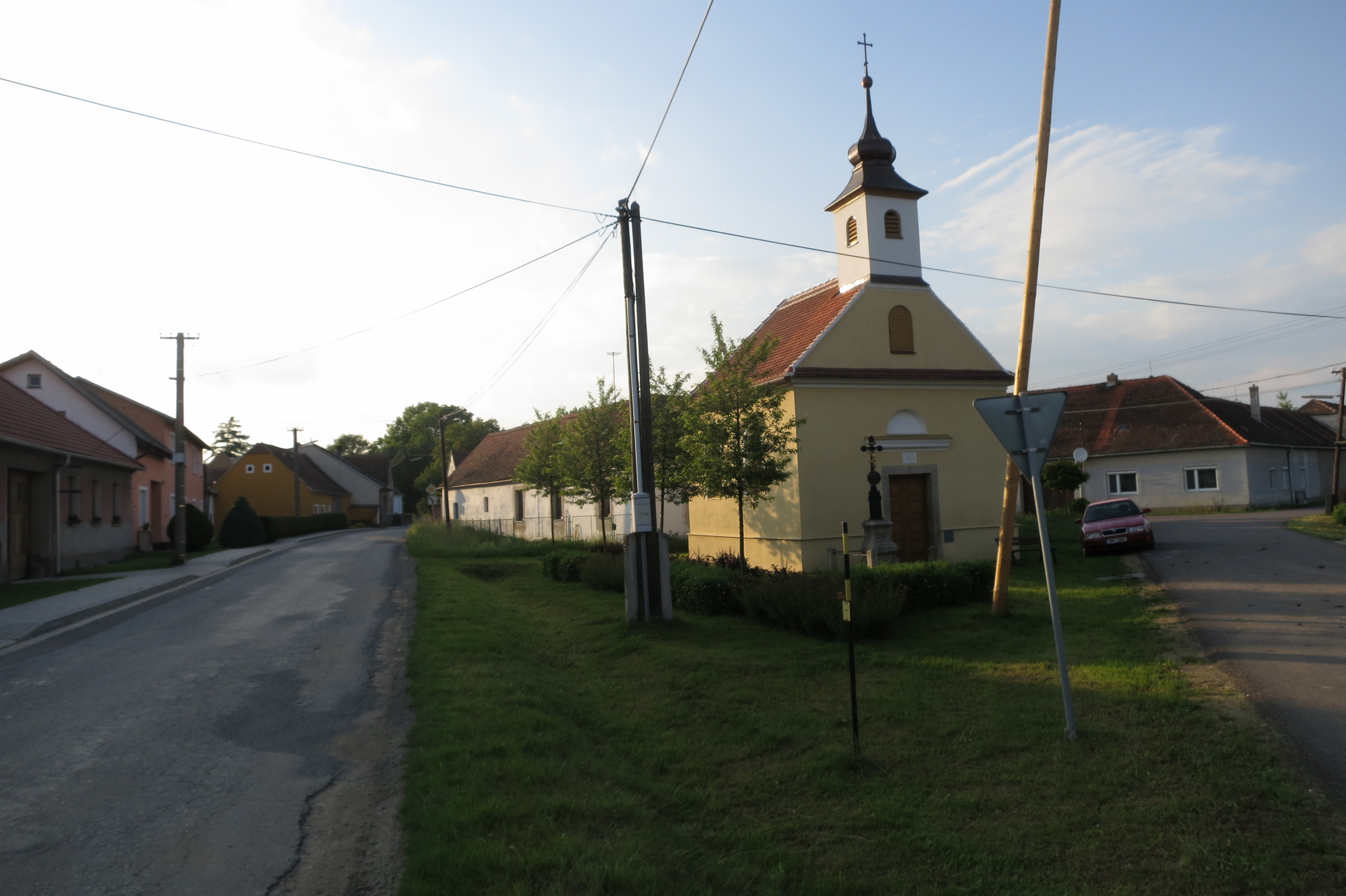
- Chapel of Saint Florian

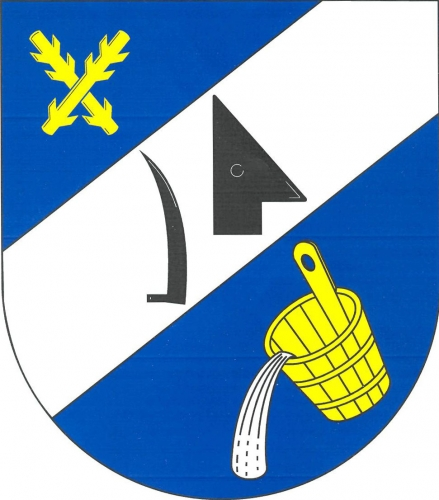
- Flag Coat of arms

- Location in the Czech Republic
- Coordinates: 48°58′59″N 15°36′46″E
- Country: Czech Republic
- Region: Vysočina
- District: Třebíč
- First mentioned: 1361

Area
  - Total: 3.07 km^{2} (1.19 sq mi)
- Elevation: 467 m (1,532 ft)

Population (2026-01-01)
  - Total: 79
  - Density: 26/km^{2} (67/sq mi)
- Time zone: UTC+1 (CET)
  - Summer (DST): UTC+2 (CEST)
- Postal code: 675 32
- Website: www.jiratice.cz

Jiratice is a municipality and village in Třebíč District in the Vysočina Region of the Czech Republic. It has about 80 inhabitants.

Jiratice lies approximately 33 kilometres (21 mi) south-west of Třebíč, 46 km (29 mi) south of Jihlava, and 149 km (93 mi) south-east of Prague.

== Demographics ==
Historical population
Year	Pop.	±%
1869	111	—
1880	108	−2.7%
1890	120	+11.1%
1900	123	+2.5%
1910	121	−1.6%
1921	115	−5.0%
1930	135	+17.4%
1950	101	−25.2%
1961	101	+0.0%
1970	101	+0.0%
1980	100	−1.0%
1991	99	−1.0%
2001	86	−13.1%
2011	69	−19.8%
2021	71	+2.9%
Source: Censuses
