= Zvěrkovice =

- Municipality
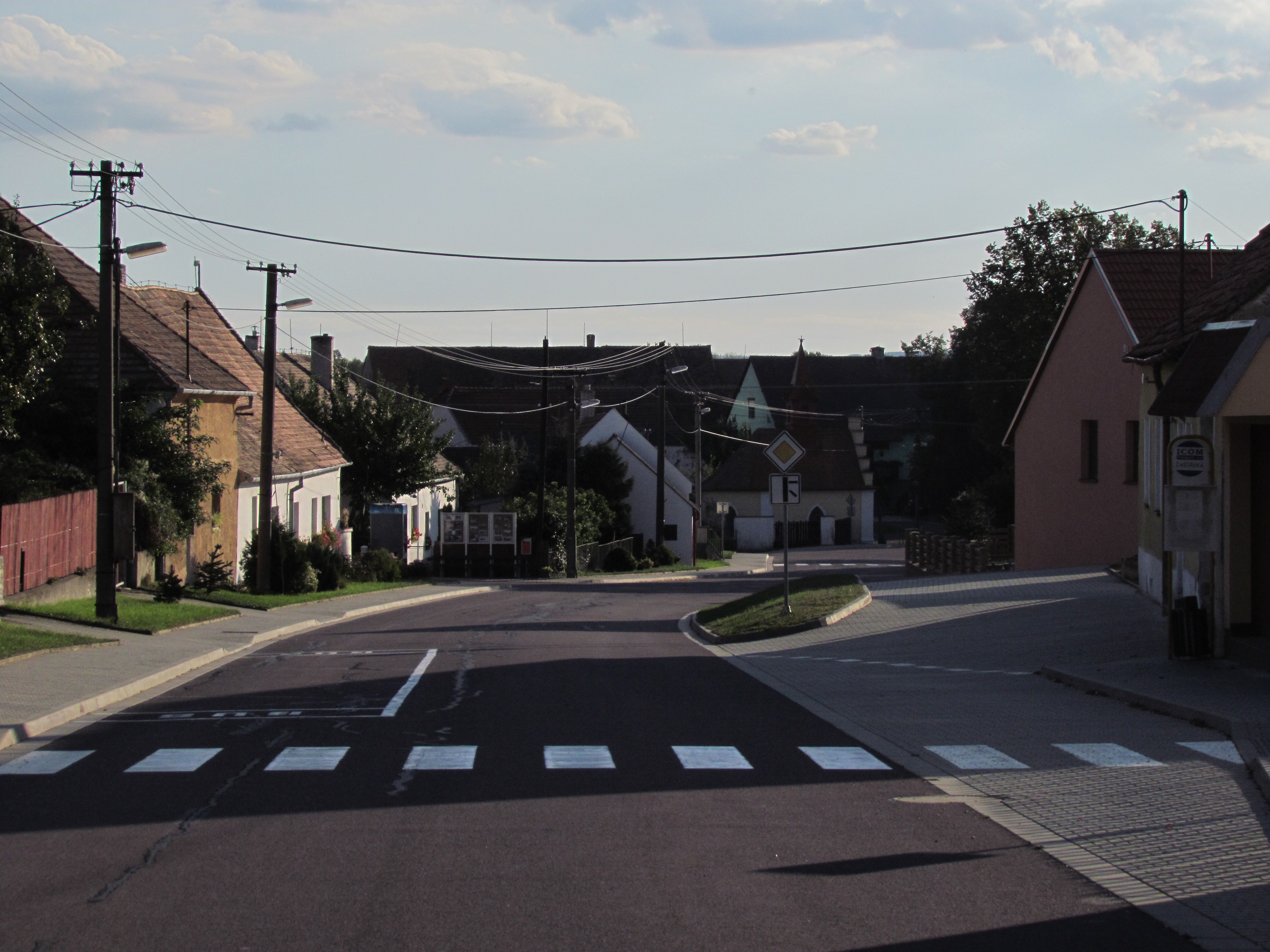
- Centre of Zvěrkovice

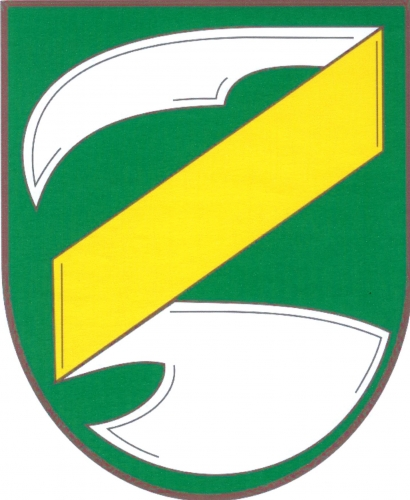
- Flag Coat of arms

- Location in the Czech Republic
- Coordinates: 49°1′32″N 15°51′37″E
- Country: Czech Republic
- Region: Vysočina
- District: Třebíč
- First mentioned: 1349

Area
  - Total: 8.23 km^{2} (3.18 sq mi)
- Elevation: 421 m (1,381 ft)

Population (2026-01-01)
  - Total: 217
  - Density: 26.4/km^{2} (68.3/sq mi)
- Time zone: UTC+1 (CET)
  - Summer (DST): UTC+2 (CEST)
- Postal code: 676 02
- Website: www.zverkovice.cz

Zvěrkovice is a municipality and village in Třebíč District in the Vysočina Region of the Czech Republic. It has about 200 inhabitants.

Zvěrkovice lies approximately 22 kilometres (14 mi) south of Třebíč, 46 km (29 mi) south-east of Jihlava, and 158 km (98 mi) south-east of Prague.

== Demographics ==
Historical population
Year	Pop.	±%
1869	281	—
1880	297	+5.7%
1890	278	−6.4%
1900	281	+1.1%
1910	266	−5.3%
1921	313	+17.7%
1930	291	−7.0%
1950	258	−11.3%
1961	304	+17.8%
1970	275	−9.5%
1980	266	−3.3%
1991	216	−18.8%
2001	222	+2.8%
2011	223	+0.5%
2021	209	−6.3%
Source: Censuses
