= Čikov =

- Municipality
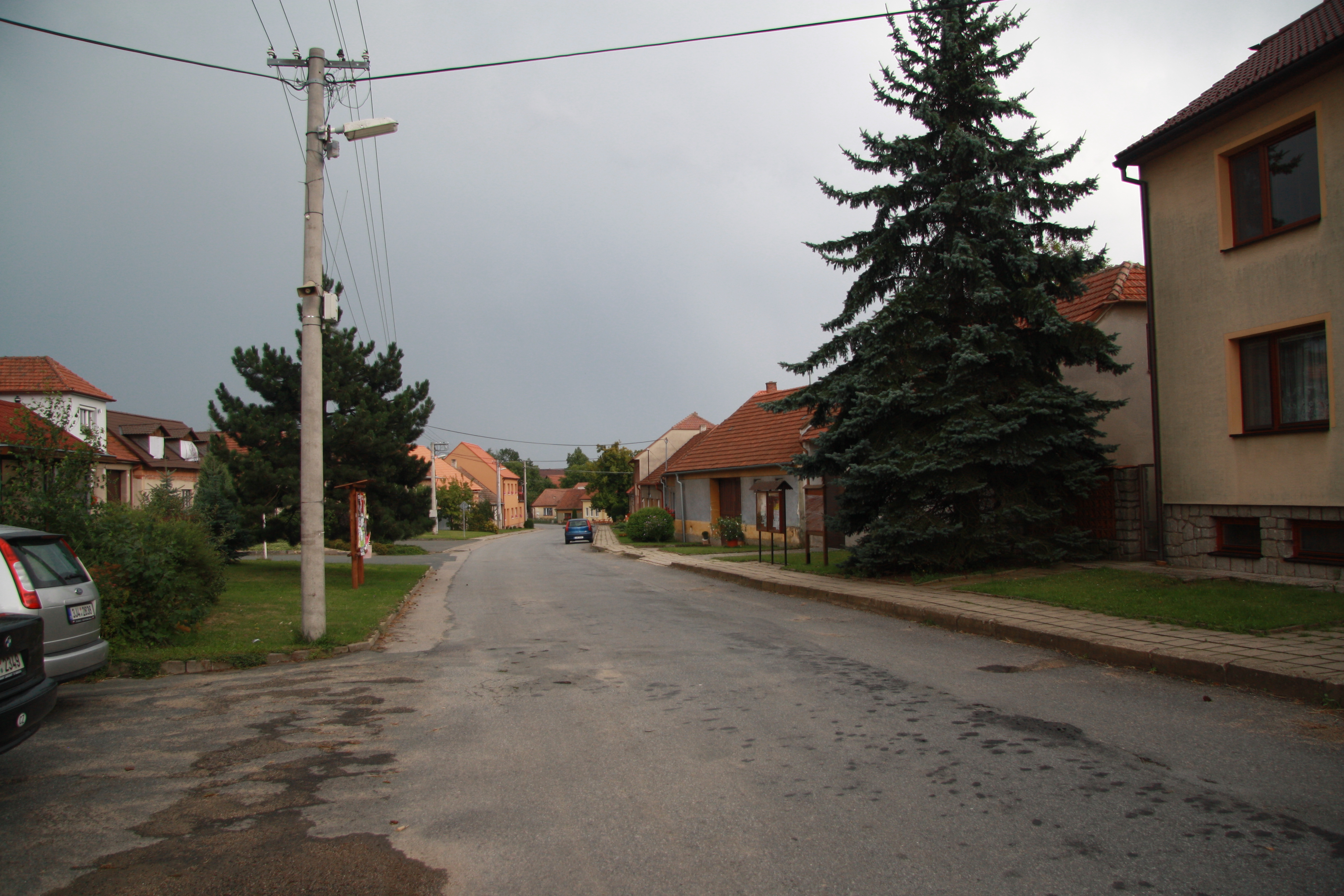
- Centre of Čikov

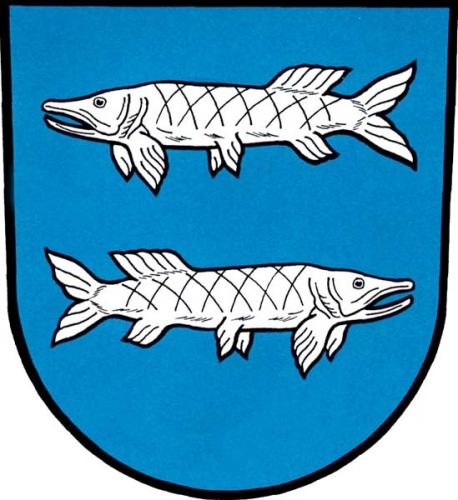
- Flag Coat of arms

- Location in the Czech Republic
- Coordinates: 49°16′10″N 16°8′27″E
- Country: Czech Republic
- Region: Vysočina
- District: Třebíč
- First mentioned: 1368

Area
  - Total: 9.68 km^{2} (3.74 sq mi)
- Elevation: 471 m (1,545 ft)

Population (2026-01-01)
  - Total: 190
  - Density: 20/km^{2} (51/sq mi)
- Time zone: UTC+1 (CET)
  - Summer (DST): UTC+2 (CEST)
- Postal code: 675 78
- Website: www.cikov.eu

Čikov is a municipality and village in Třebíč District in the Vysočina Region of the Czech Republic. It has about 200 inhabitants.

Čikov lies approximately 20 kilometres (12 mi) east of Třebíč, 43 km (27 mi) east of Jihlava, and 154 km (96 mi) south-east of Prague.

== Demographics ==
Historical population
Year	Pop.	±%
1869	293	—
1880	333	+13.7%
1890	316	−5.1%
1900	330	+4.4%
1910	327	−0.9%
1921	319	−2.4%
1930	326	+2.2%
1950	252	−22.7%
1961	255	+1.2%
1970	272	+6.7%
1980	269	−1.1%
1991	241	−10.4%
2001	223	−7.5%
2011	196	−12.1%
2021	176	−10.2%
Source: Censuses
