= Pozďatín =

- Municipality
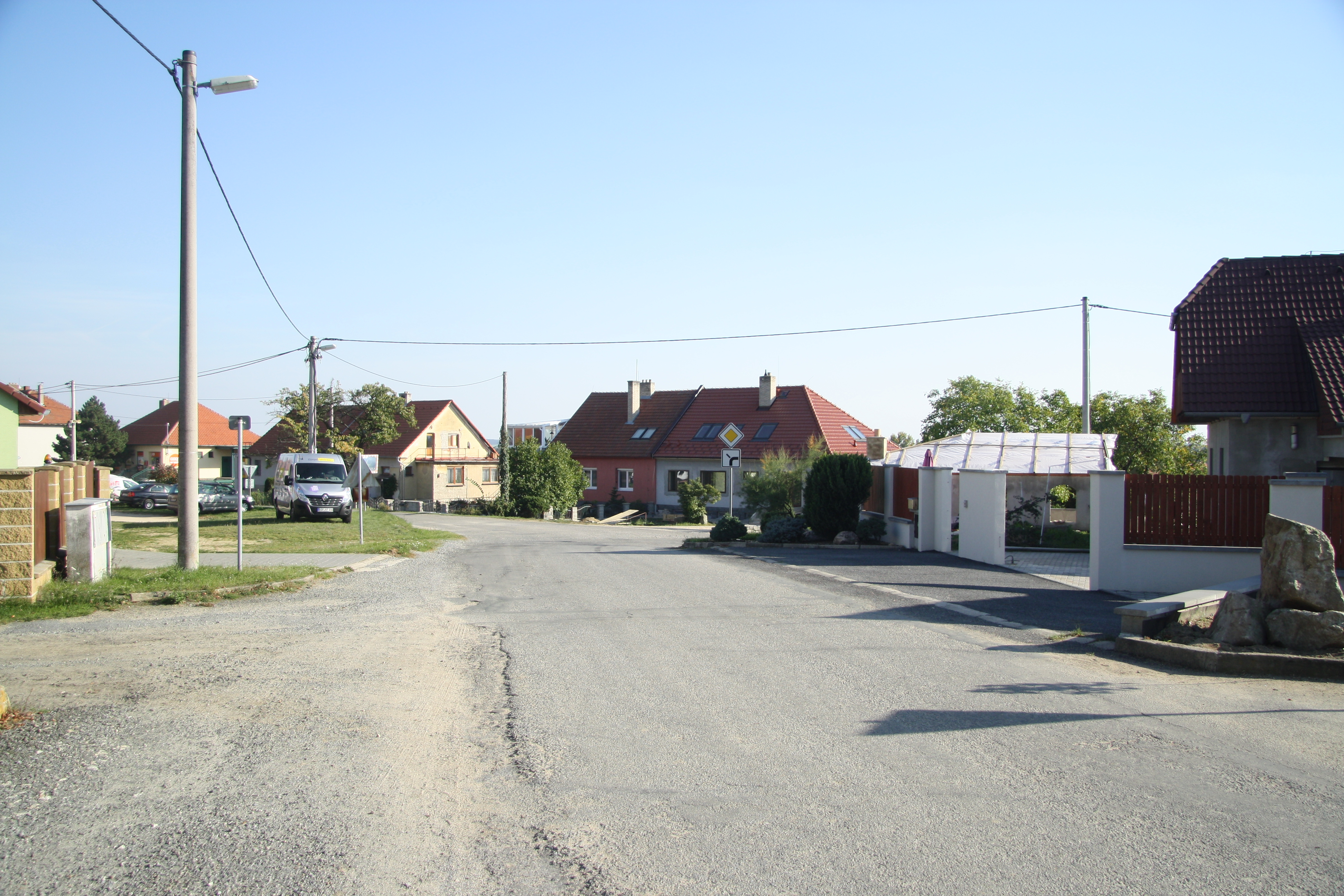
- Centre of Pozďatín

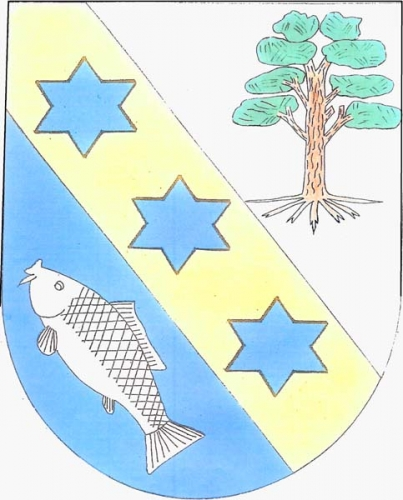
- Flag Coat of arms

- Location in the Czech Republic
- Coordinates: 49°14′9″N 16°2′16″E
- Country: Czech Republic
- Region: Vysočina
- District: Třebíč
- First mentioned: 1358

Area
  - Total: 5.72 km^{2} (2.21 sq mi)
- Elevation: 464 m (1,522 ft)

Population (2026-01-01)
  - Total: 173
  - Density: 30.2/km^{2} (78.3/sq mi)
- Time zone: UTC+1 (CET)
  - Summer (DST): UTC+2 (CEST)
- Postal code: 675 03
- Website: www.pozdatin.cz

Pozďatín is a municipality and village in Třebíč District in the Vysočina Region of the Czech Republic. It has about 200 inhabitants.

Pozďatín lies approximately 13 kilometres (8 mi) east of Třebíč, 38 km (24 mi) south-east of Jihlava, and 151 km (94 mi) south-east of Prague.

== Demographics ==
Historical population
Year	Pop.	±%
1869	193	—
1880	219	+13.5%
1890	252	+15.1%
1900	225	−10.7%
1910	236	+4.9%
1921	240	+1.7%
1930	228	−5.0%
1950	226	−0.9%
1961	219	−3.1%
1970	222	+1.4%
1980	226	+1.8%
1991	193	−14.6%
2001	191	−1.0%
2011	160	−16.2%
2021	157	−1.9%
Source: Censuses
