= Slavičky =

- Municipality
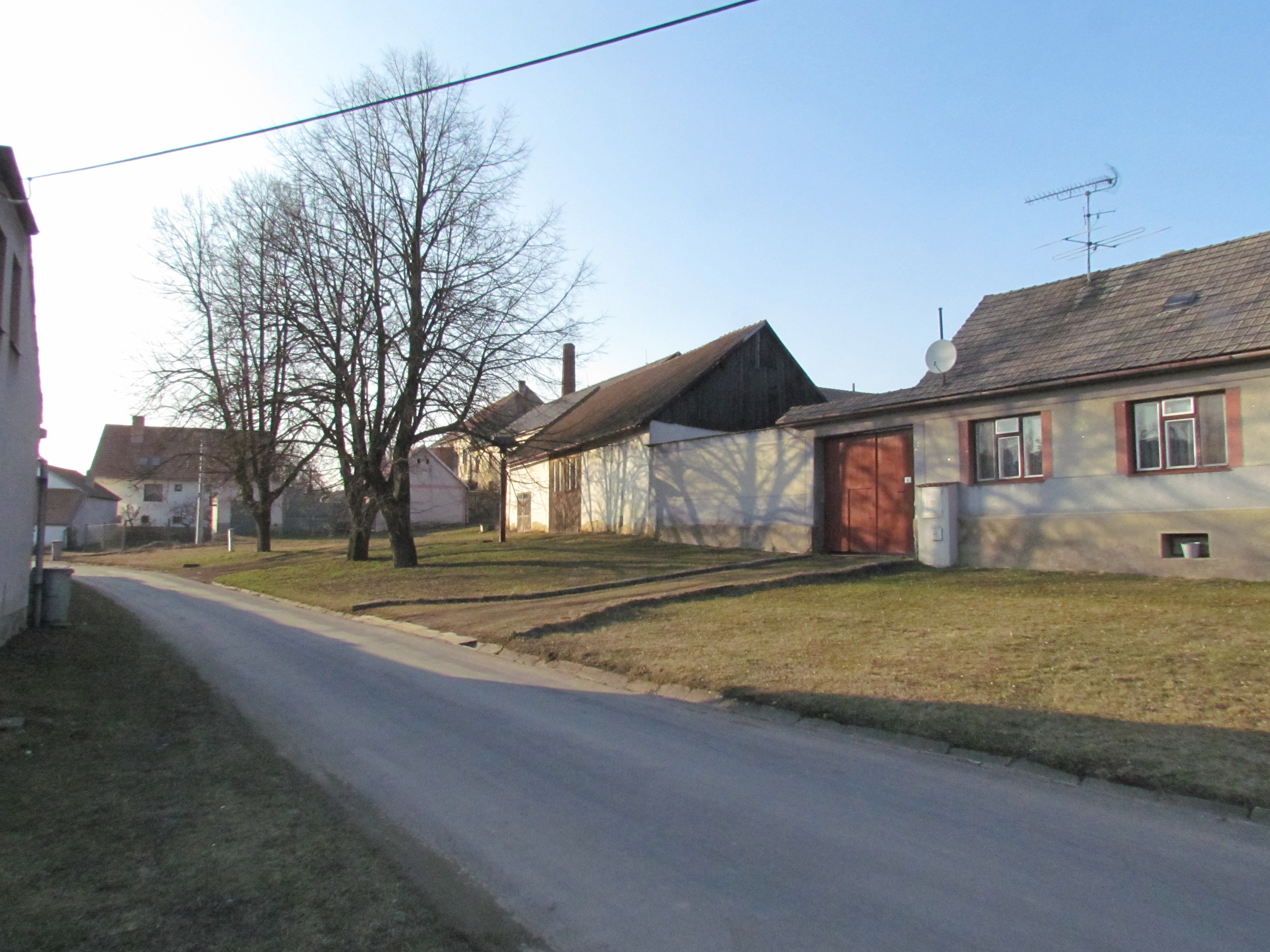
- Centre of Slavičky

- Location in the Czech Republic
- Coordinates: 49°10′29″N 15°58′4″E
- Country: Czech Republic
- Region: Vysočina
- District: Třebíč
- First mentioned: 1556

Area
  - Total: 9.06 km^{2} (3.50 sq mi)
- Elevation: 490 m (1,610 ft)

Population (2026-01-01)
  - Total: 303
  - Density: 33.4/km^{2} (86.6/sq mi)
- Time zone: UTC+1 (CET)
  - Summer (DST): UTC+2 (CEST)
- Postal code: 675 01
- Website: www.slavicky.cz

Slavičky is a municipality and village in Třebíč District in the Vysočina Region of the Czech Republic. It has about 300 inhabitants.

Slavičky lies approximately 9 kilometres (6 mi) south-east of Třebíč, 37 km (23 mi) south-east of Jihlava, and 151 km (94 mi) south-east of Prague.

== Administrative division ==
Slavičky consists of three municipal parts (in brackets population according to the 2021 census):

- Slavičky (144)
- Okrašovice (61)
- Pozďátky (70)

== History ==
The first written mention of Slavičky is from 1556. Okrašovice and Pozďátky were first documented in 1101.

== Demographics ==
Historical population
Year	Pop.	±%
1869	427	—
1880	424	−0.7%
1890	428	+0.9%
1900	452	+5.6%
1910	504	+11.5%
1921	546	+8.3%
1930	490	−10.3%
1950	358	−26.9%
1961	361	+0.8%
1970	301	−16.6%
1980	249	−17.3%
1991	226	−9.2%
2001	225	−0.4%
2011	241	+7.1%
2021	275	+14.1%
Source: Censuses
