= Čechtín =

- Municipality
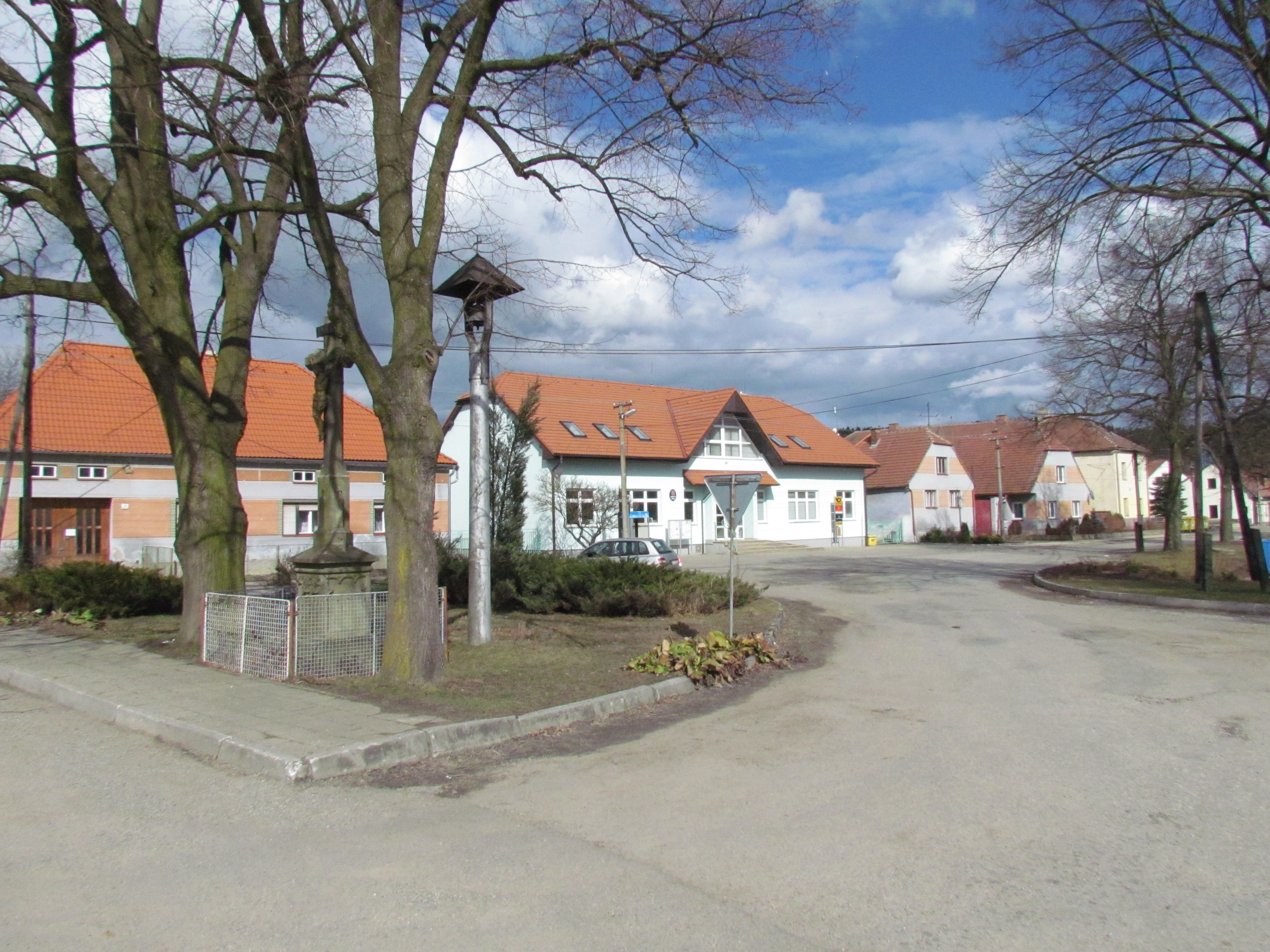
- Centre of Čechtín

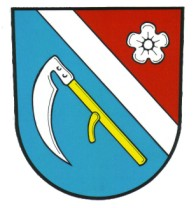
- Flag Coat of arms

- Location in the Czech Republic
- Coordinates: 49°17′35″N 15°49′12″E
- Country: Czech Republic
- Region: Vysočina
- District: Třebíč
- First mentioned: 1406

Area
  - Total: 6.34 km^{2} (2.45 sq mi)
- Elevation: 534 m (1,752 ft)

Population (2026-01-01)
  - Total: 308
  - Density: 48.6/km^{2} (126/sq mi)
- Time zone: UTC+1 (CET)
  - Summer (DST): UTC+2 (CEST)
- Postal code: 675 07
- Website: www.obeccechtin.cz

Čechtín is a municipality and village in Třebíč District in the Vysočina Region of the Czech Republic. It has about 300 inhabitants.

Čechtín lies approximately 10 kilometres (6 mi) north-west of Třebíč, 21 km (13 mi) south-east of Jihlava, and 134 km (83 mi) south-east of Prague.

== Demographics ==
Historical population
Year	Pop.	±%
1869	340	—
1880	344	+1.2%
1890	368	+7.0%
1900	354	−3.8%
1910	375	+5.9%
1921	367	−2.1%
1930	357	−2.7%
1950	290	−18.8%
1961	294	+1.4%
1970	270	−8.2%
1980	302	+11.9%
1991	315	+4.3%
2001	312	−1.0%
2011	297	−4.8%
2021	296	−0.3%
Source: Censuses
