= Nárameč =

- Municipality
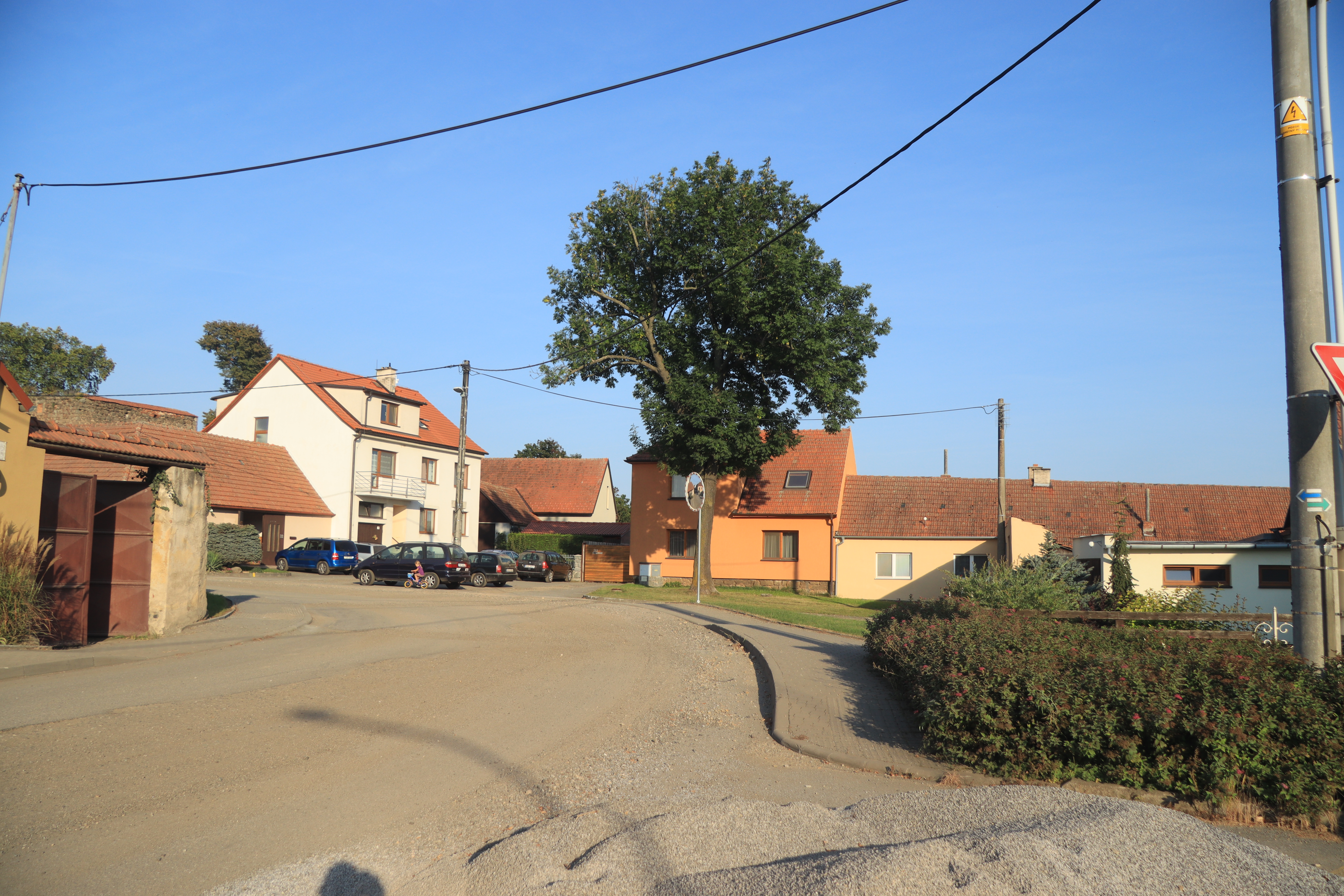
- Centre of Nárameč

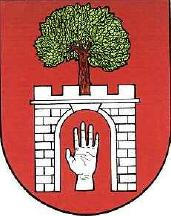
- Flag Coat of arms

- Location in the Czech Republic
- Coordinates: 49°15′52″N 15°58′29″E
- Country: Czech Republic
- Region: Vysočina
- District: Třebíč
- First mentioned: 1104

Area
  - Total: 7.86 km^{2} (3.03 sq mi)
- Elevation: 460 m (1,510 ft)

Population (2026-01-01)
  - Total: 360
  - Density: 46/km^{2} (120/sq mi)
- Time zone: UTC+1 (CET)
  - Summer (DST): UTC+2 (CEST)
- Postal code: 675 03
- Website: www.naramec.cz

Nárameč is a municipality and village in Třebíč District in the Vysočina Region of the Czech Republic. It has about 400 inhabitants.

Nárameč lies approximately 9 kilometres (6 mi) north-east of Třebíč, 32 km (20 mi) south-east of Jihlava, and 144 km (89 mi) south-east of Prague.

== Demographics ==
Historical population
Year	Pop.	±%
1869	407	—
1880	419	+2.9%
1890	451	+7.6%
1900	447	−0.9%
1910	461	+3.1%
1921	453	−1.7%
1930	379	−16.3%
1950	386	+1.8%
1961	410	+6.2%
1970	390	−4.9%
1980	390	+0.0%
1991	367	−5.9%
2001	362	−1.4%
2011	335	−7.5%
2021	340	+1.5%
Source: Censuses
