= Horní Vilémovice =

- Municipality
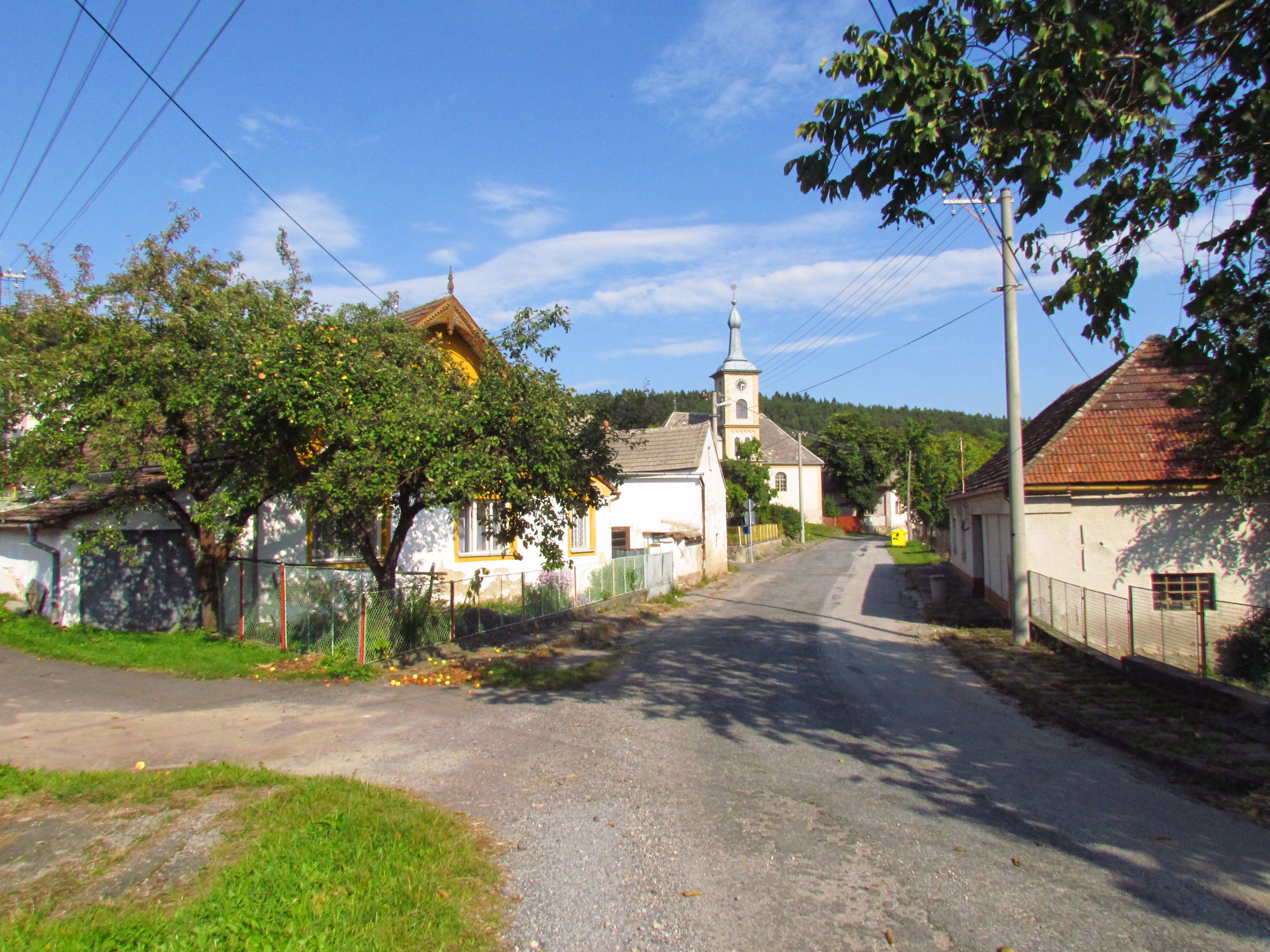
- Centre of Horní Vilémovice

- Location in the Czech Republic
- Coordinates: 49°17′30″N 15°52′51″E
- Country: Czech Republic
- Region: Vysočina
- District: Třebíč
- First mentioned: 1360

Area
  - Total: 9.76 km^{2} (3.77 sq mi)
- Elevation: 590 m (1,940 ft)

Population (2026-01-01)
  - Total: 76
  - Density: 7.8/km^{2} (20/sq mi)
- Time zone: UTC+1 (CET)
  - Summer (DST): UTC+2 (CEST)
- Postal code: 675 07
- Website: www.hornivilemovice.cz

Horní Vilémovice (German: Ober Willimowitz) is a municipality and village in Třebíč District in the Vysočina Region of the Czech Republic. It has about 80 inhabitants.

Horní Vilémovice lies approximately 8 kilometres (5 mi) north of Třebíč, 25 km (16 mi) south-east of Jihlava, and 138 km (86 mi) south-east of Prague.

== Demographics ==
Historical population
Year	Pop.	±%
1869	194	—
1880	212	+9.3%
1890	239	+12.7%
1900	224	−6.3%
1910	225	+0.4%
1921	210	−6.7%
1930	177	−15.7%
1950	124	−29.9%
1961	133	+7.3%
1970	112	−15.8%
1980	85	−24.1%
1991	85	+0.0%
2001	83	−2.4%
2011	71	−14.5%
2021	80	+12.7%
Source: Censuses
