= Třebelovice =

- Municipality
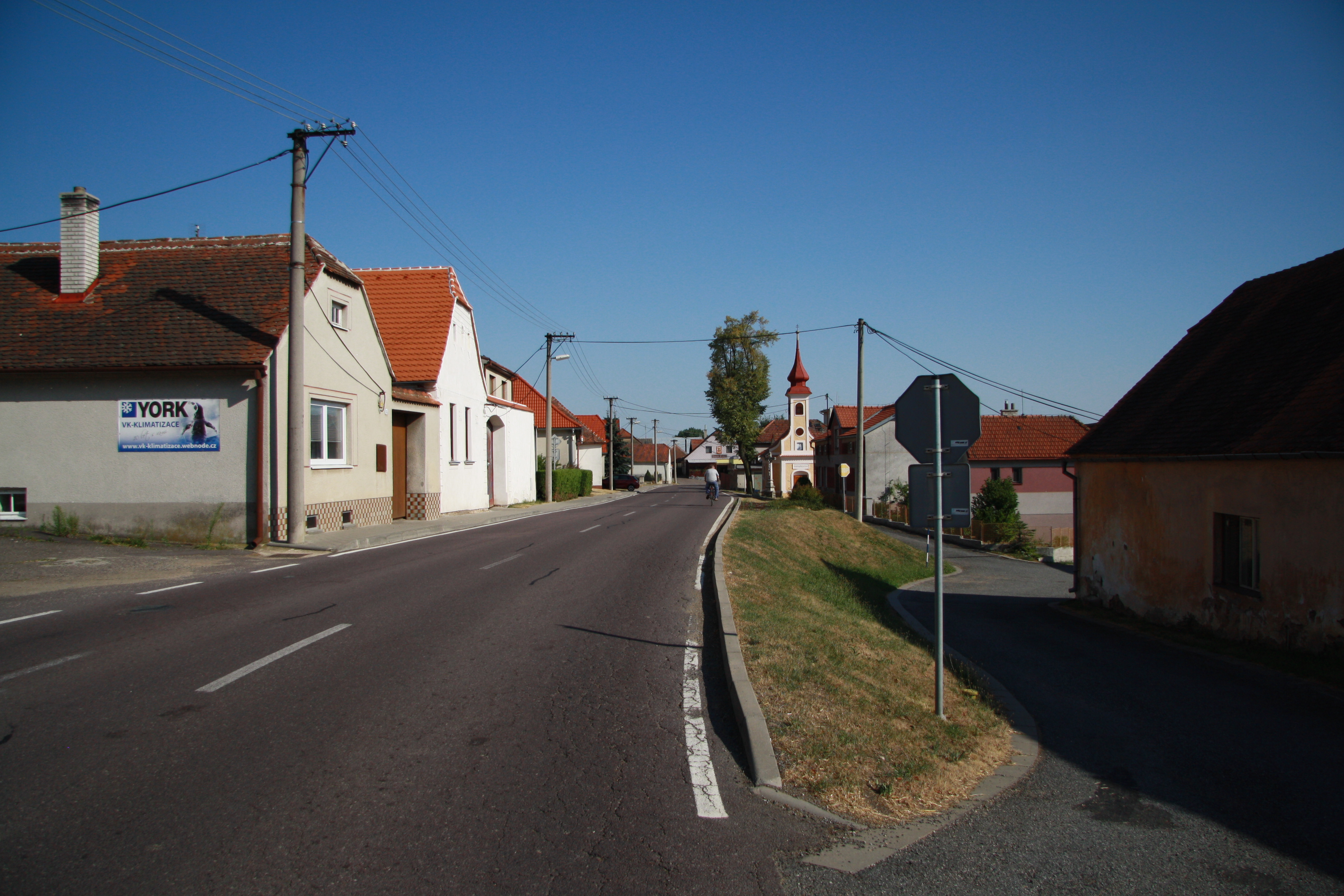
- Centre of Třebelovice

- Flag Coat of arms

- Location in the Czech Republic
- Coordinates: 49°1′20″N 15°39′58″E
- Country: Czech Republic
- Region: Vysočina
- District: Třebíč
- First mentioned: 1365

Area
  - Total: 11.44 km^{2} (4.42 sq mi)
- Elevation: 468 m (1,535 ft)

Population (2026-01-01)
  - Total: 429
  - Density: 37.5/km^{2} (97.1/sq mi)
- Time zone: UTC+1 (CET)
  - Summer (DST): UTC+2 (CEST)
- Postal code: 675 32
- Website: www.obectrebelovice.cz

Třebelovice is a municipality and village in Třebíč District in the Vysočina Region of the Czech Republic. It has about 400 inhabitants.

Třebelovice lies approximately 27 kilometres (17 mi) south-west of Třebíč, 42 km (26 mi) south of Jihlava, and 149 km (93 mi) south-east of Prague.

== History ==
The first written mention of Třebelovice is from 1365.

== Demographics ==
Historical population
Year	Pop.	±%
1869	608	—
1880	622	+2.3%
1890	643	+3.4%
1900	686	+6.7%
1910	718	+4.7%
1921	668	−7.0%
1930	609	−8.8%
1950	538	−11.7%
1961	531	−1.3%
1970	516	−2.8%
1980	518	+0.4%
1991	465	−10.2%
2001	467	+0.4%
2011	417	−10.7%
2021	394	−5.5%
Source: Censuses
