= Rohy =

- Municipality
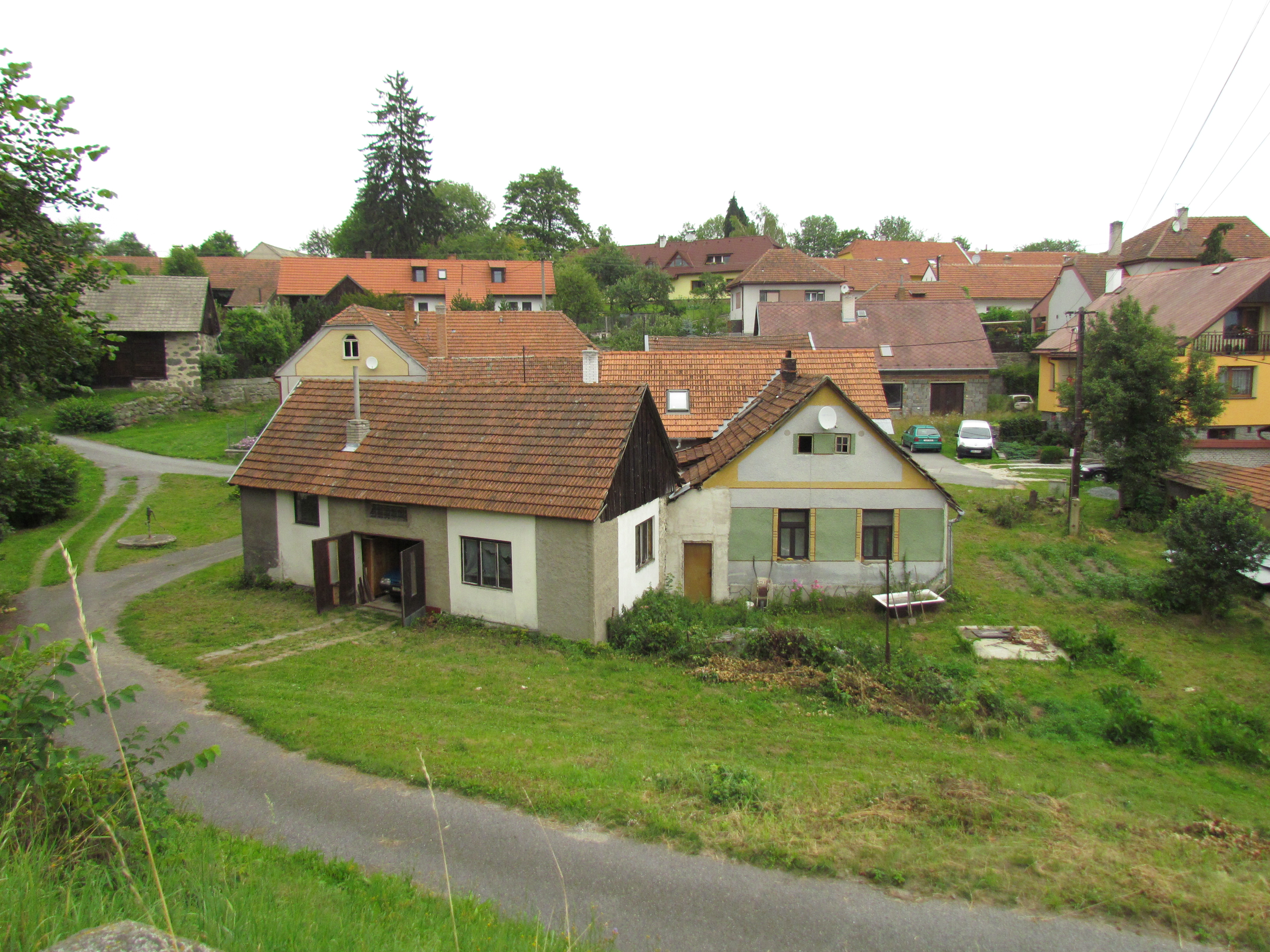
- Centre of Rohy

- Flag Coat of arms

- Location in the Czech Republic
- Coordinates: 49°18′20″N 16°0′20″E
- Country: Czech Republic
- Region: Vysočina
- District: Třebíč
- First mentioned: 1377

Area
  - Total: 6.39 km^{2} (2.47 sq mi)
- Elevation: 473 m (1,552 ft)

Population (2026-01-01)
  - Total: 112
  - Density: 17.5/km^{2} (45.4/sq mi)
- Time zone: UTC+1 (CET)
  - Summer (DST): UTC+2 (CEST)
- Postal code: 675 05
- Website: www.obecrohy.cz

Rohy is a municipality and village in Třebíč District in the Vysočina Region of the Czech Republic. It has about 100 inhabitants.

Rohy lies approximately 14 kilometres (9 mi) north-east of Třebíč, 32 km (20 mi) east of Jihlava, and 143 km (89 mi) south-east of Prague.

== Demographics ==
Historical population
Year	Pop.	±%
1869	180	—
1880	263	+46.1%
1890	251	−4.6%
1900	266	+6.0%
1910	279	+4.9%
1921	283	+1.4%
1930	248	−12.4%
1950	217	−12.5%
1961	209	−3.7%
1970	204	−2.4%
1980	184	−9.8%
1991	165	−10.3%
2001	139	−15.8%
2011	118	−15.1%
2021	111	−5.9%
Source: Censuses
