= Benetice =

- Municipality
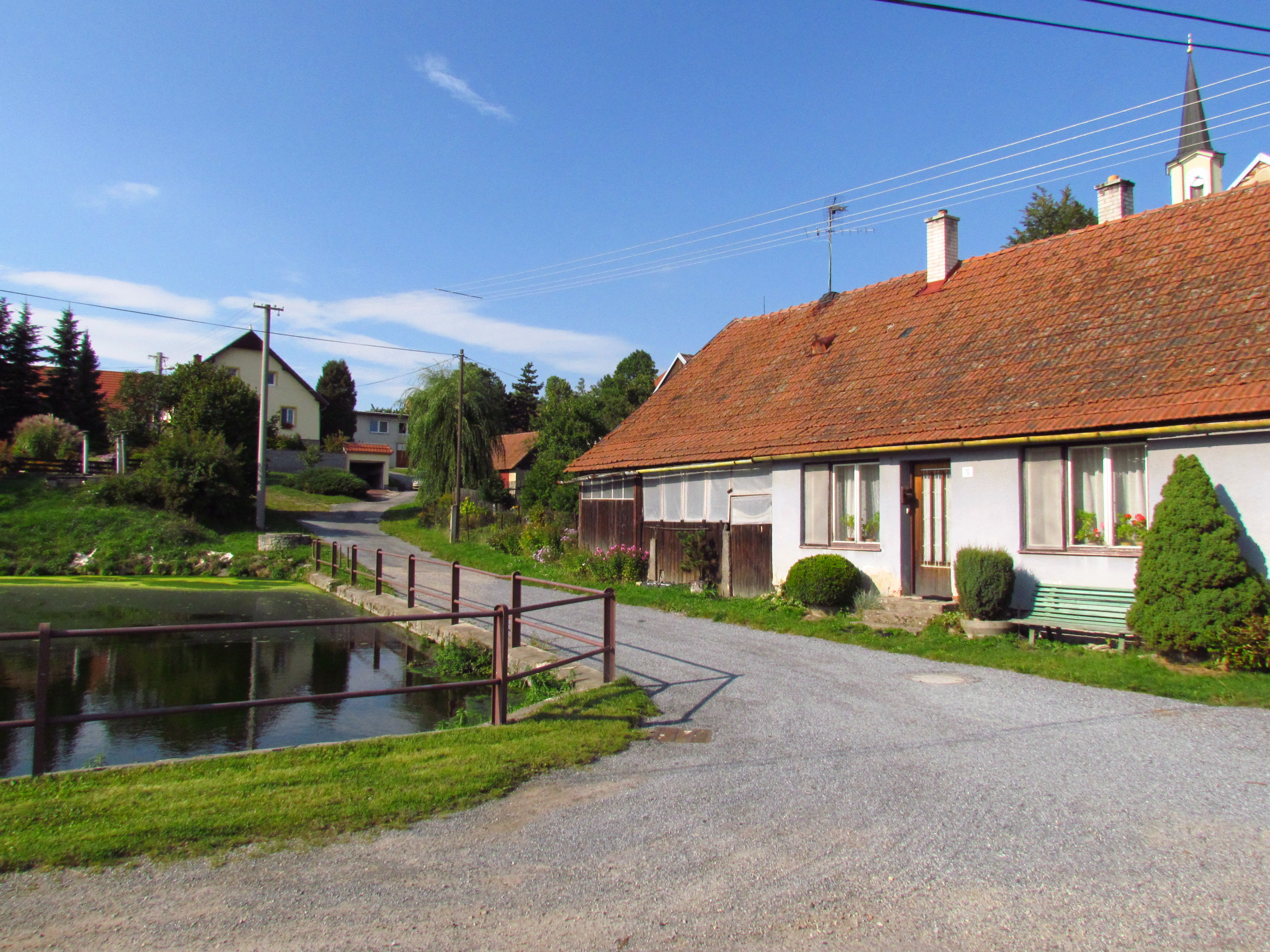
- Centre of Benetice

- Flag Coat of arms

- Location in the Czech Republic
- Coordinates: 49°17′52″N 15°52′2″E
- Country: Czech Republic
- Region: Vysočina
- District: Třebíč
- First mentioned: 1409

Area
  - Total: 4.91 km^{2} (1.90 sq mi)
- Elevation: 566 m (1,857 ft)

Population (2026-01-01)
  - Total: 192
  - Density: 39.1/km^{2} (101/sq mi)
- Time zone: UTC+1 (CET)
  - Summer (DST): UTC+2 (CEST)
- Postal code: 675 06
- Website: benetice.net

Benetice is a municipality and village in Třebíč District in the Vysočina Region of the Czech Republic. It has about 200 inhabitants.

== Administrative division ==
Benetice consists of two municipal parts (in brackets population according to the 2021 census):

- Benetice (140)
- Věstoňovice (51)

== Demographics ==
Historical population
Year	Pop.	±%
1869	214	—
1880	234	+9.3%
1890	267	+14.1%
1900	250	−6.4%
1910	230	−8.0%
1921	244	+6.1%
1930	252	+3.3%
1950	159	−36.9%
1961	185	+16.4%
1970	175	−5.4%
1980	193	+10.3%
1991	198	+2.6%
2001	183	−7.6%
2011	190	+3.8%
2021	191	+0.5%
Source: Censuses
