= Bohušice =

- Municipality
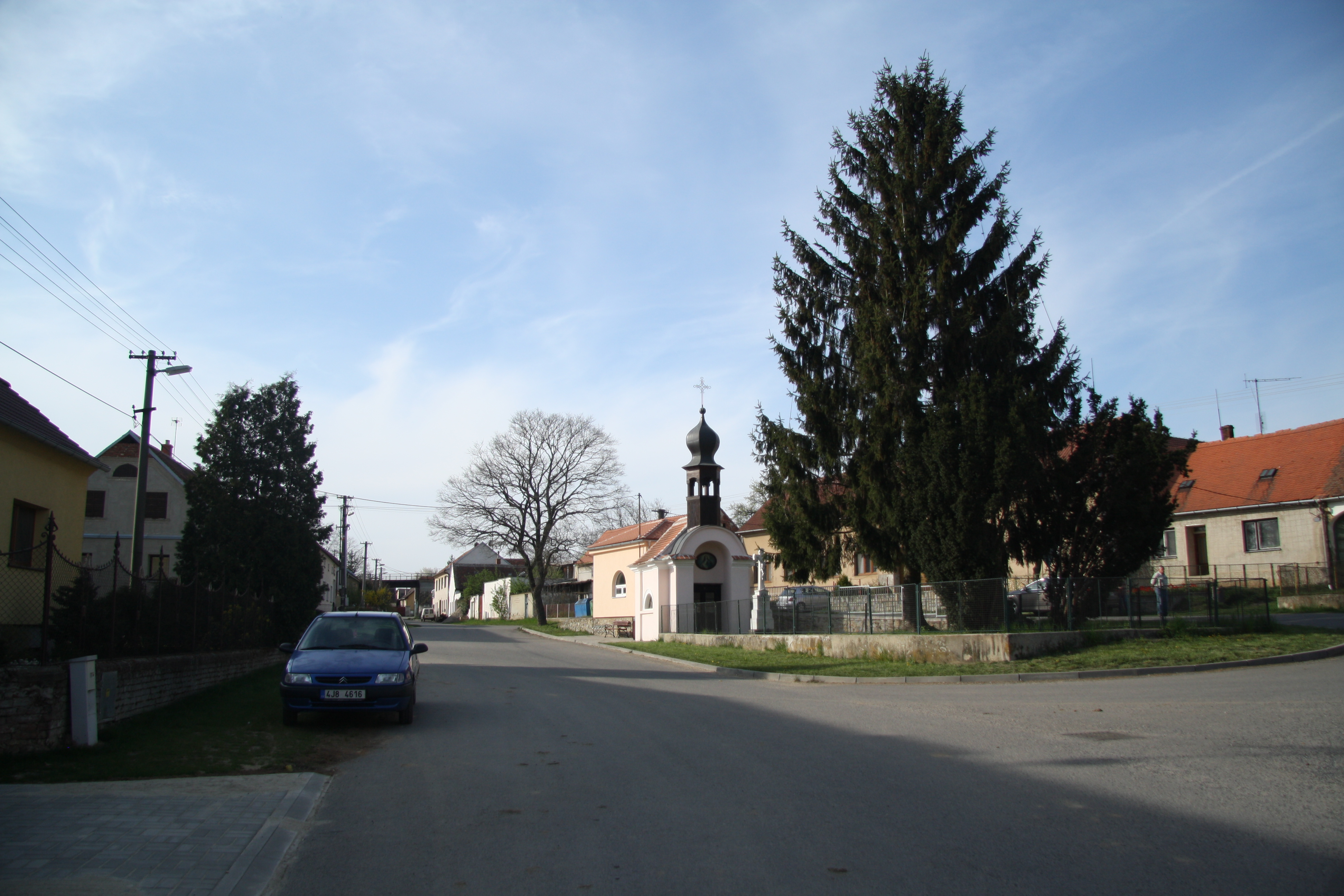
- Centre of Bohušice

- Location in the Czech Republic
- Coordinates: 49°5′7″N 15°51′8″E
- Country: Czech Republic
- Region: Vysočina
- District: Třebíč
- First mentioned: 1355

Area
  - Total: 5.27 km^{2} (2.03 sq mi)
- Elevation: 440 m (1,440 ft)

Population (2026-01-01)
  - Total: 121
  - Density: 23.0/km^{2} (59.5/sq mi)
- Time zone: UTC+1 (CET)
  - Summer (DST): UTC+2 (CEST)
- Postal code: 675 51
- Website: www.obecbohusice.cz

Bohušice is a municipality and village in Třebíč District in the Vysočina Region of the Czech Republic. It has about 100 inhabitants.

Bohušice lies approximately 73 kilometres (45 mi) east of Třebíč, 98 km (61 mi) east of Jihlava, and 208 km (129 mi) south-east of Prague.

== Demographics ==
Historical population
Year	Pop.	±%
1869	246	—
1880	285	+15.9%
1890	288	+1.1%
1900	307	+6.6%
1910	272	−11.4%
1921	292	+7.4%
1930	275	−5.8%
1950	222	−19.3%
1961	208	−6.3%
1970	176	−15.4%
1980	153	−13.1%
1991	114	−25.5%
2001	120	+5.3%
2011	129	+7.5%
2021	123	−4.7%
Source: Censuses
