= Hornice =

- Municipality
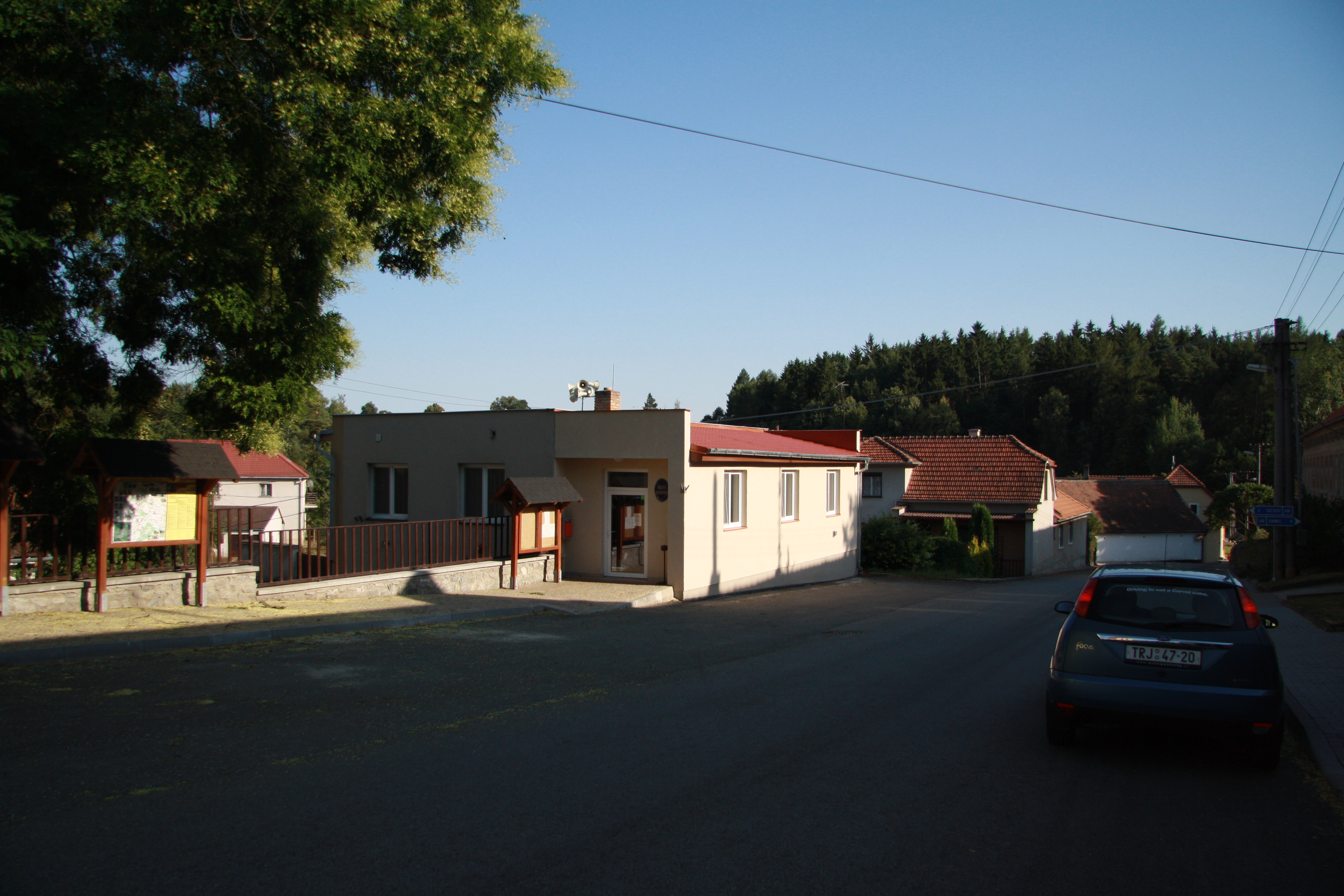
- Centre of Hornice

- Location in the Czech Republic
- Coordinates: 48°59′43″N 15°40′49″E
- Country: Czech Republic
- Region: Vysočina
- District: Třebíč
- First mentioned: 1358

Area
  - Total: 3.28 km^{2} (1.27 sq mi)
- Elevation: 443 m (1,453 ft)

Population (2026-01-01)
  - Total: 68
  - Density: 21/km^{2} (54/sq mi)
- Time zone: UTC+1 (CET)
  - Summer (DST): UTC+2 (CEST)
- Postal code: 675 32
- Website: www.hornice.cz

Hornice is a municipality and village in Třebíč District in the Vysočina Region of the Czech Republic. It has about 70 inhabitants.

Hornice lies approximately 27 kilometres (17 mi) south-west of Třebíč, 44 km (27 mi) south of Jihlava, and 151 km (94 mi) south-east of Prague.

== Demographics ==
Historical population
Year	Pop.	±%
1869	156	—
1880	158	+1.3%
1890	148	−6.3%
1900	145	−2.0%
1910	139	−4.1%
1921	158	+13.7%
1930	168	+6.3%
1950	119	−29.2%
1961	120	+0.8%
1970	120	+0.0%
1980	114	−5.0%
1991	84	−26.3%
2001	80	−4.8%
2011	80	+0.0%
2021	61	−23.8%
Source: Censuses
