= Vestec =

Vestec may refer to places in the Czech Republic:

- Vestec (Náchod District), a municipality and village in the Hradec Králové Region
- Vestec (Nymburk District), a municipality and village in the Central Bohemian Region
- Vestec (Prague-West District), a municipality and village in the Central Bohemian Region
- Vestec, a village and part of Běstvina in the Pardubice Region
- Vestec, a village and part of Chocerady in the Central Bohemian Region
- Vestec, a village and part of Chrudim in the Pardubice Bohemian Region
- Vestec, a village and part of Hřiměždice in the Central Bohemian Region
- Vestec, a hamlet and part of Mezno in the Central Bohemian Region
- Vestec, a village and part of Zaloňov in the Hradec Králové Region
- Vestec, a hamlet and part of Zbizuby in the Central Bohemian Region
- Vestec, a village and part of Zvěstov in the Central Bohemian Region
- Nový Vestec, a municipality and village in the Central Bohemian Region
- Starý Vestec, a municipality and village in the Central Bohemian Region
