= Černčice =

Černčice may refer to places in the Czech Republic:

- Černčice (Louny District), a municipality and village in the Ústí nad Labem Region
- Černčice (Náchod District), a municipality and village in the Hradec Králové Region
- Černčice, a village and part of Petrohrad in the Ústí nad Labem Region
- Černčice, a village and part of Žalany in the Ústí nad Labem Region
