= Rožnov =

Rožnov is name of several places in the Czech Republic:

- Rožnov pod Radhoštěm, a town in the Zlín Region
- Rožnov (Náchod District), a village in the Hradec Králové Region
