= Dolní Radechová =

- Municipality
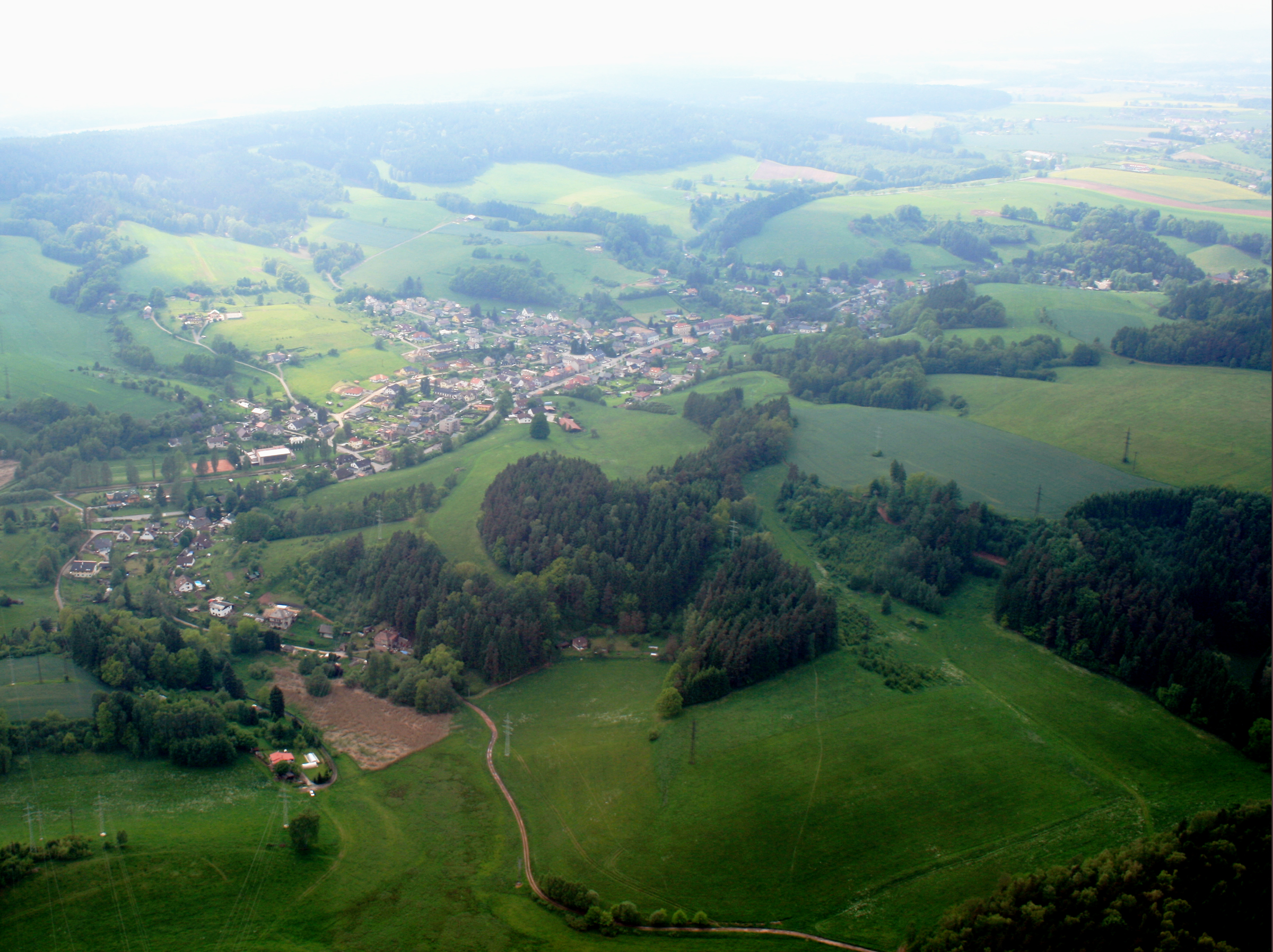
- Aerial view

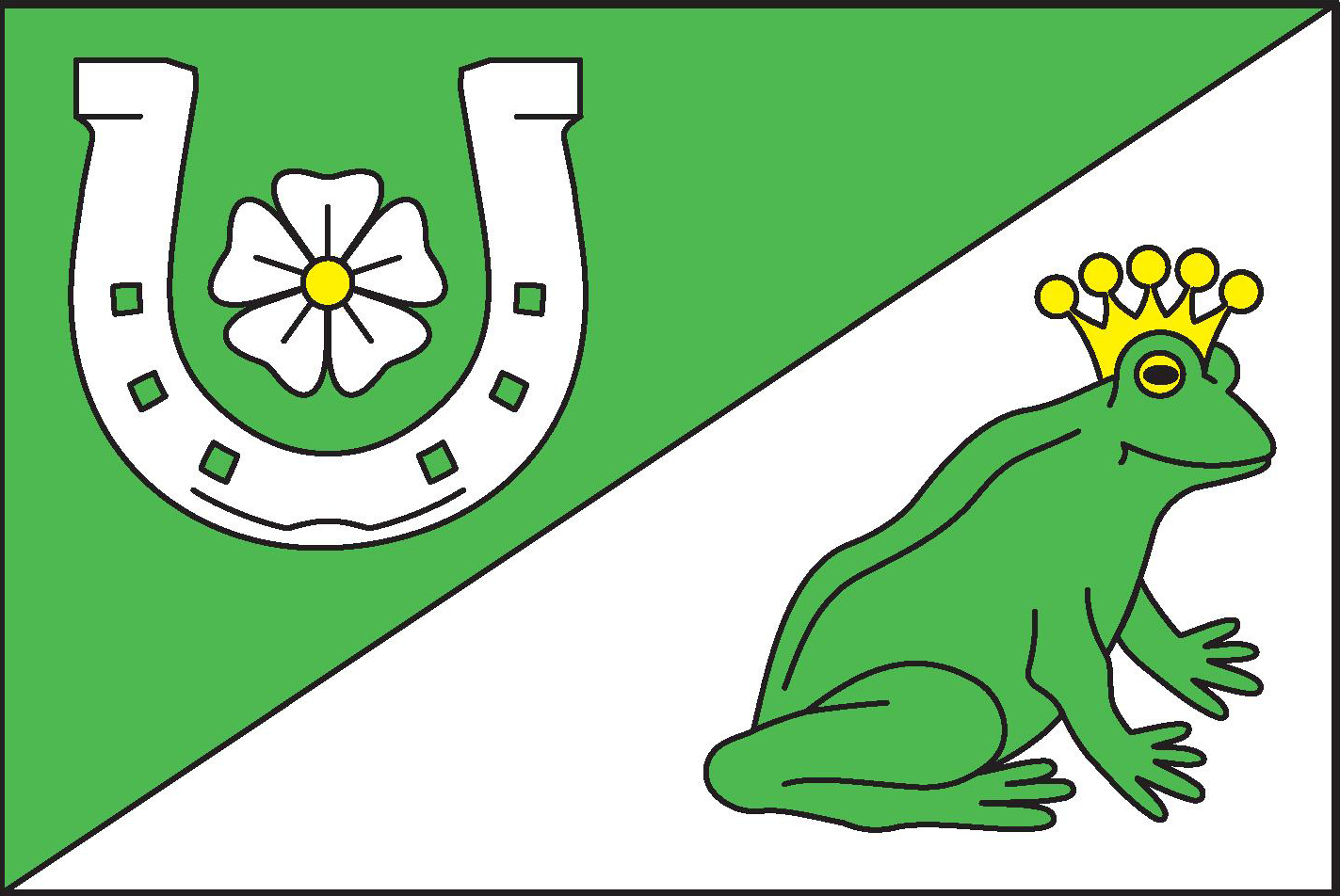
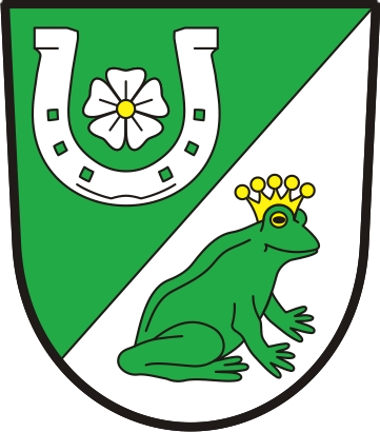
- Flag Coat of arms

- Location in the Czech Republic
- Coordinates: 50°26′18″N 16°9′5″E
- Country: Czech Republic
- Region: Hradec Králové
- District: Náchod
- First mentioned: 1402

Area
  - Total: 4.20 km^{2} (1.62 sq mi)
- Elevation: 359 m (1,178 ft)

Population (2026-01-01)
  - Total: 765
  - Density: 182/km^{2} (472/sq mi)
- Time zone: UTC+1 (CET)
  - Summer (DST): UTC+2 (CEST)
- Postal code: 549 11
- Website: www.dolniradechova.cz

Dolní Radechová (German: Nieder Radechau) is a municipality and village in Náchod District in the Hradec Králové Region of the Czech Republic. It has about 800 inhabitants.

== Demographics ==
Historical population
| Year | Pop. | ±% |
|---|---|---|
| 1869 | 511 | — |
| 1880 | 518 | +1.4% |
| 1890 | 627 | +21.0% |
| 1900 | 849 | +35.4% |
| 1910 | 983 | +15.8% |
| 1921 | 830 | −15.6% |
| 1930 | 937 | +12.9% |
| 1950 | 840 | −10.4% |
| 1961 | 853 | +1.5% |
| 1970 | 819 | −4.0% |
| 1980 | 725 | −11.5% |
| 1991 | 659 | −9.1% |
| 2001 | 675 | +2.4% |
| 2011 | 755 | +11.9% |
| 2021 | 704 | −6.8% |
Source: Censuses
