= Zábrodí =

- Municipality
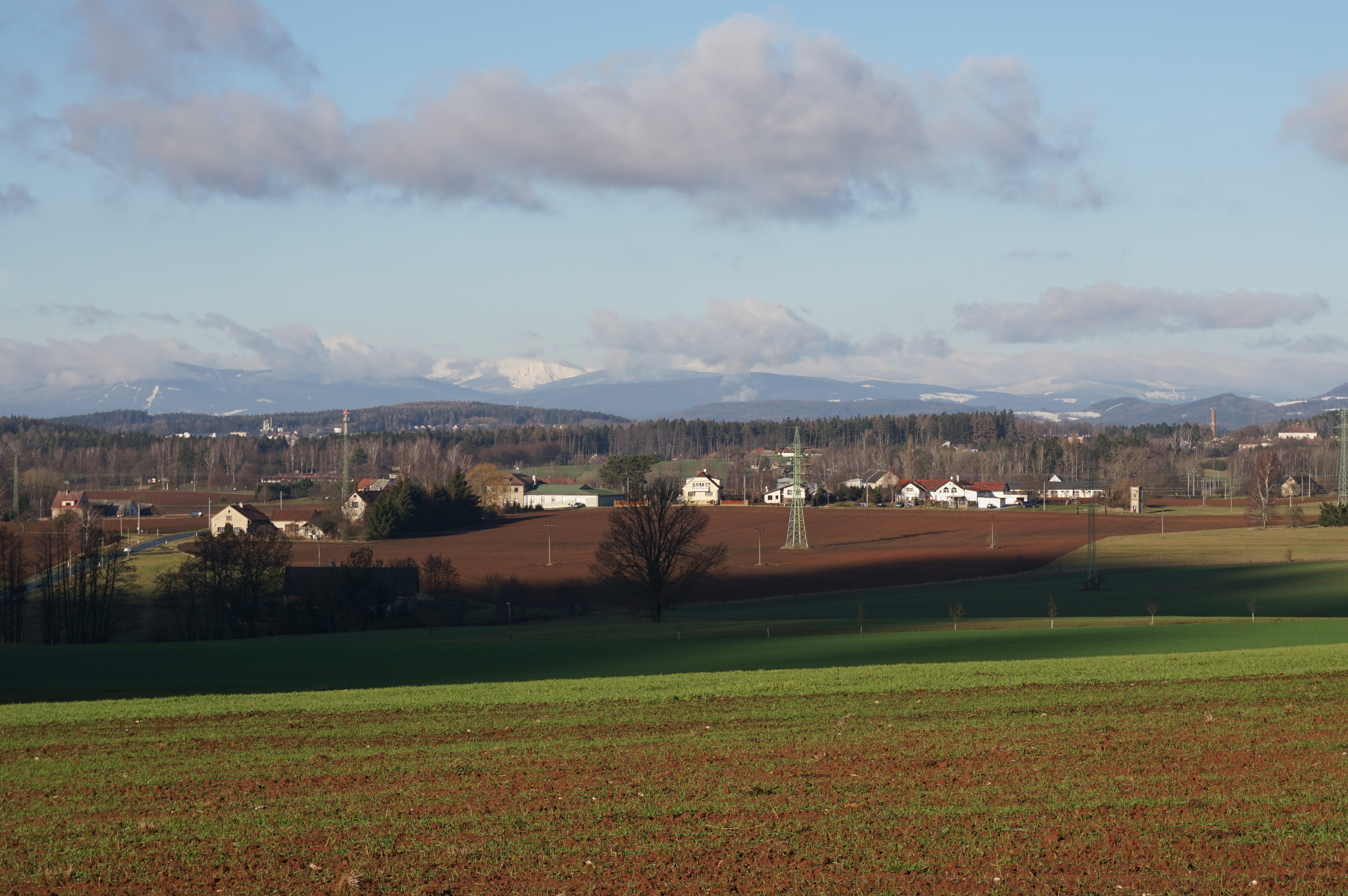
- General view of Zábrodí

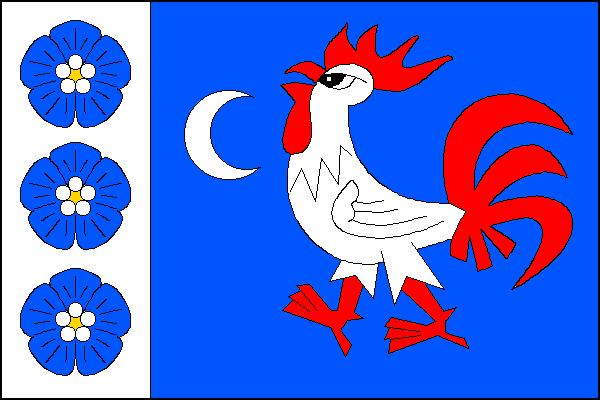
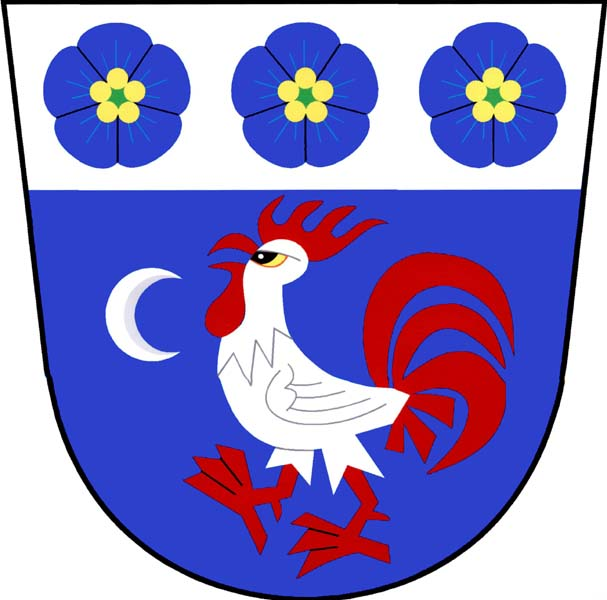
- Flag Coat of arms

- Location in the Czech Republic
- Coordinates: 50°27′35″N 16°6′45″E
- Country: Czech Republic
- Region: Hradec Králové
- District: Náchod
- First mentioned: 1582

Area
  - Total: 8.22 km^{2} (3.17 sq mi)
- Elevation: 419 m (1,375 ft)

Population (2026-01-01)
  - Total: 583
  - Density: 70.9/km^{2} (184/sq mi)
- Time zone: UTC+1 (CET)
  - Summer (DST): UTC+2 (CEST)
- Postal code: 549 41
- Website: www.zabrodi.cz

Zábrodí is a municipality and village in Náchod District in the Hradec Králové Region of the Czech Republic. It has about 600 inhabitants.

== Administrative division ==
Zábrodí consists of three municipal parts (in brackets population according to the 2021 census):

- Zábrodí (177)
- Horní Rybníky (216)
- Končiny (151)

== Demographics ==
Historical population
Year	Pop.	±%
1869	541	—
1880	723	+33.6%
1890	730	+1.0%
1900	805	+10.3%
1910	712	−11.6%
1921	392	−44.9%
1930	568	+44.9%
1950	289	−49.1%
1961	476	+64.7%
1970	443	−6.9%
1980	411	−7.2%
1991	424	+3.2%
2001	429	+1.2%
2011	462	+7.7%
2021	544	+17.7%
Source: Censuses
