= Jetřichov =

- Municipality
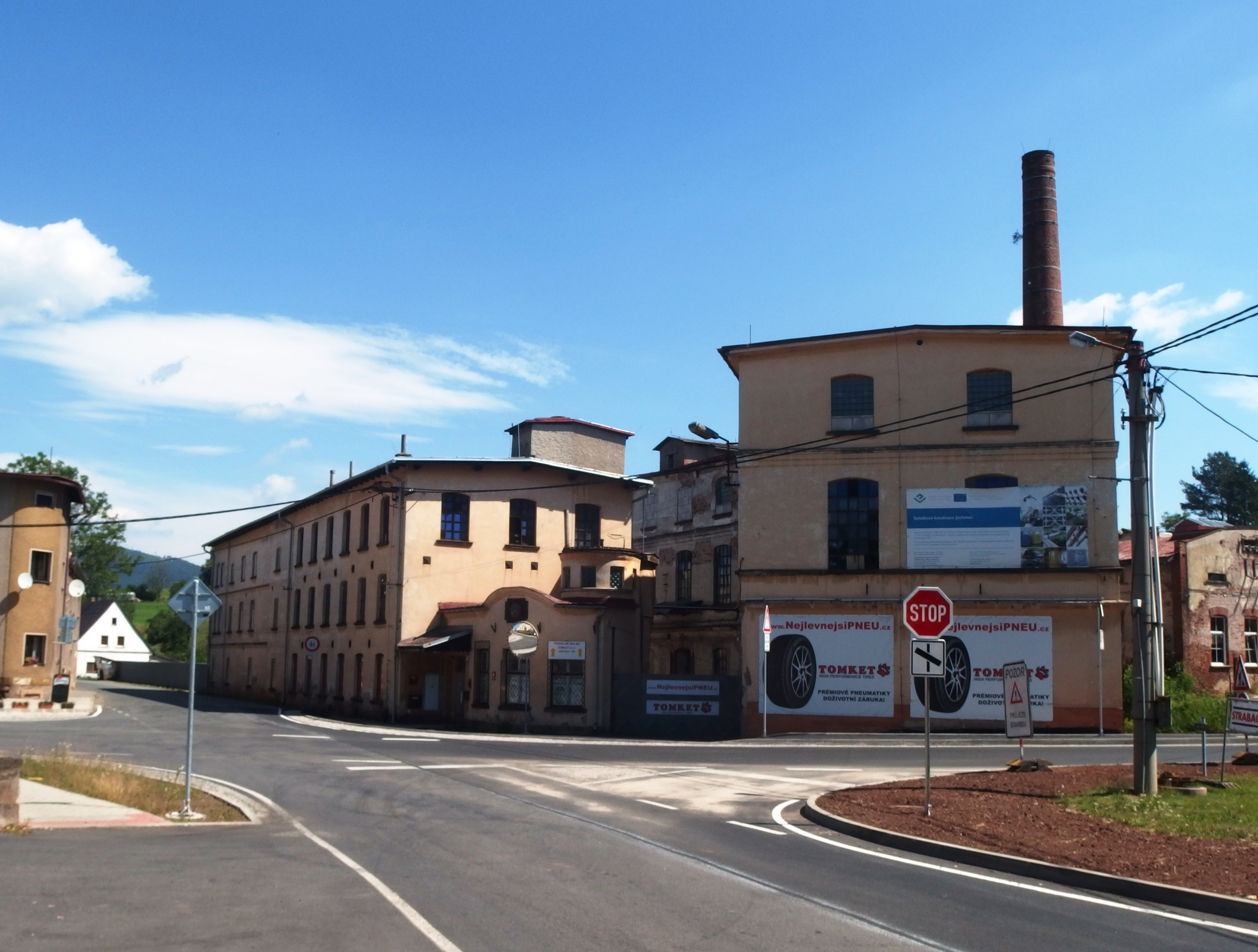
- Factory at the main intersection

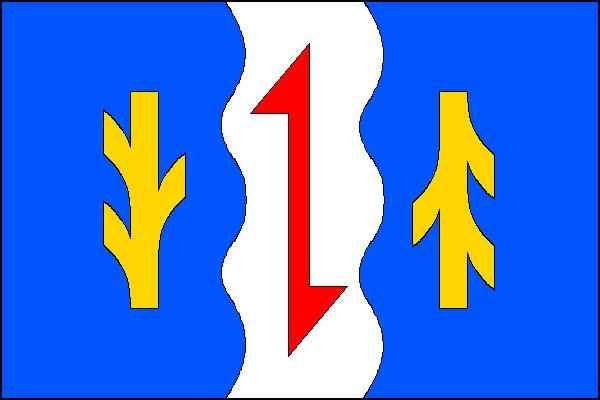
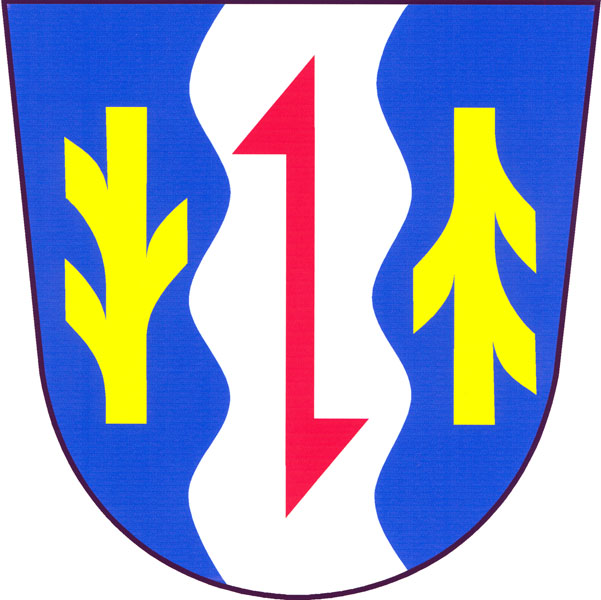
- Flag Coat of arms

- Location in the Czech Republic
- Coordinates: 50°36′54″N 16°16′0″E
- Country: Czech Republic
- Region: Hradec Králové
- District: Náchod
- First mentioned: 1395

Area
  - Total: 9.25 km^{2} (3.57 sq mi)
- Elevation: 449 m (1,473 ft)

Population (2026-01-01)
  - Total: 426
  - Density: 46.1/km^{2} (119/sq mi)
- Time zone: UTC+1 (CET)
  - Summer (DST): UTC+2 (CEST)
- Postal code: 549 83
- Website: www.jetrichov.cz

Jetřichov (German: Dittersbach) is a municipality and village in Náchod District in the Hradec Králové Region of the Czech Republic. It has about 400 inhabitants.

== Demographics ==
Historical population
Year	Pop.	±%
1869	1,165	—
1880	1,181	+1.4%
1890	1,310	+10.9%
1900	1,340	+2.3%
1910	1,503	+12.2%
1921	1,300	−13.5%
1930	1,242	−4.5%
1950	725	−41.6%
1961	585	−19.3%
1970	561	−4.1%
1980	497	−11.4%
1991	439	−11.7%
2001	472	+7.5%
2011	431	−8.7%
2021	421	−2.3%
Source: Censuses
