= Žďárky =

- Municipality
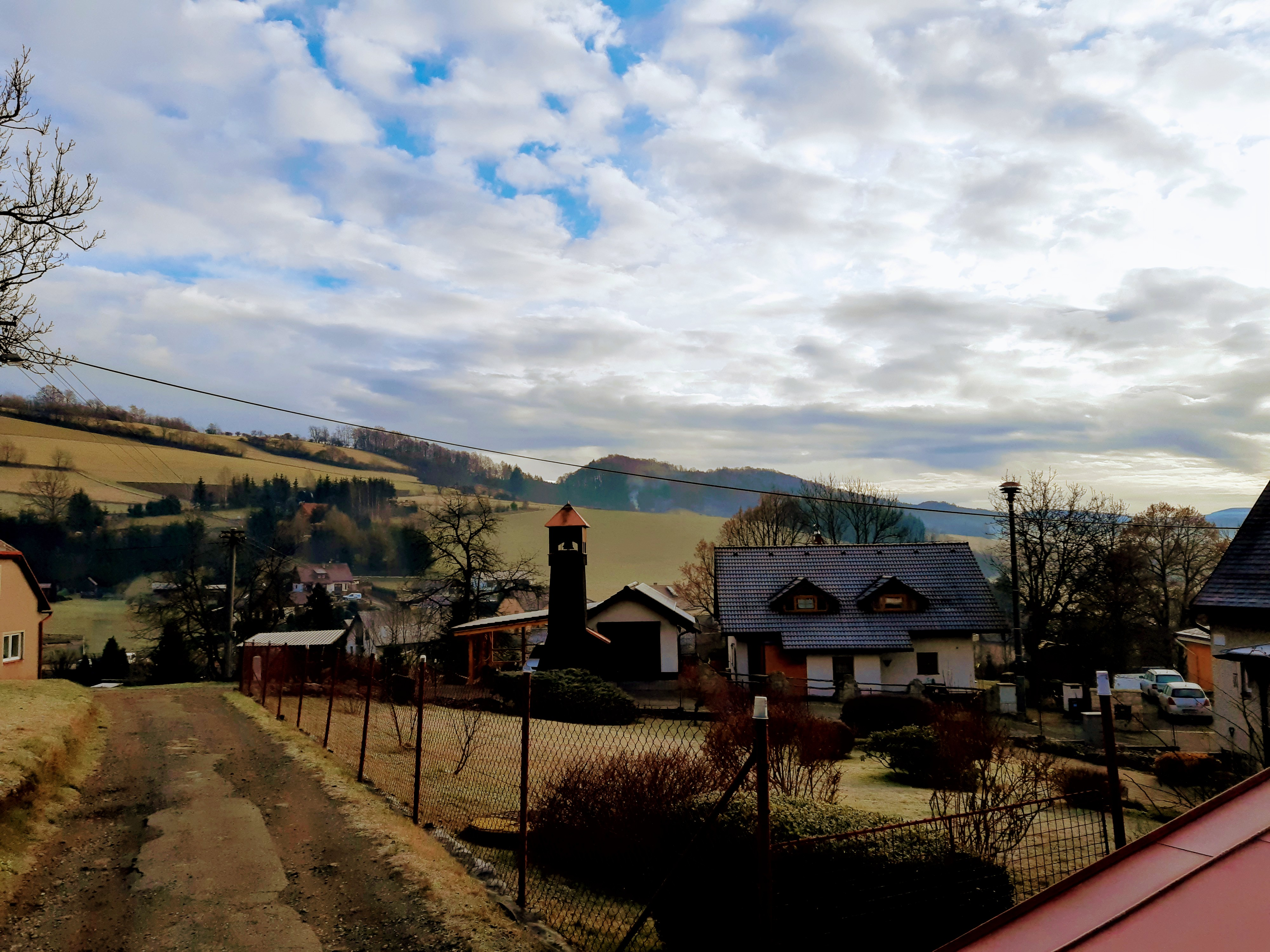
- General view

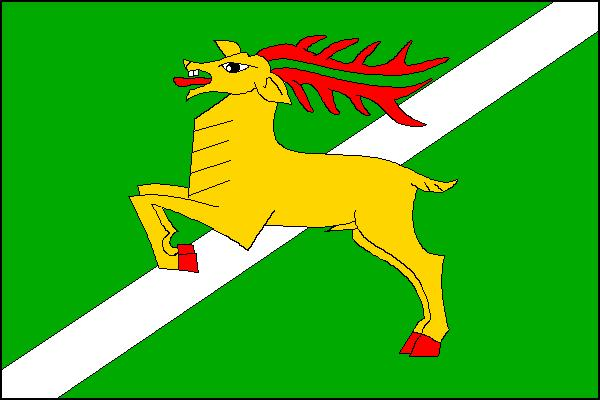
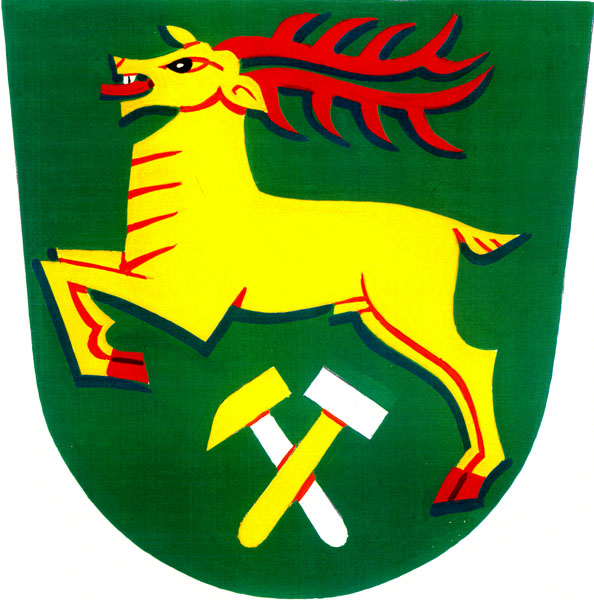
- Flag Coat of arms

- Location in the Czech Republic
- Coordinates: 50°28′6″N 16°13′39″E
- Country: Czech Republic
- Region: Hradec Králové
- District: Náchod
- First mentioned: 1415

Area
  - Total: 4.60 km^{2} (1.78 sq mi)
- Elevation: 397 m (1,302 ft)

Population (2026-01-01)
  - Total: 584
  - Density: 127/km^{2} (329/sq mi)
- Time zone: UTC+1 (CET)
  - Summer (DST): UTC+2 (CEST)
- Postal code: 549 37
- Website: www.obeczdarky.cz

Žďárky (German: Kleinbrand) is a municipality and village in Náchod District in the Hradec Králové Region of the Czech Republic. It has about 600 inhabitants.

== Demographics ==
Historical population
Year	Pop.	±%
1869	859	—
1880	933	+8.6%
1890	999	+7.1%
1900	956	−4.3%
1910	918	−4.0%
1921	853	−7.1%
1930	775	−9.1%
1950	577	−25.5%
1961	513	−11.1%
1970	462	−9.9%
1980	501	+8.4%
1991	541	+8.0%
2001	549	+1.5%
2011	560	+2.0%
2021	563	+0.5%
Source: Censuses
