= Mezilečí =

- Municipality
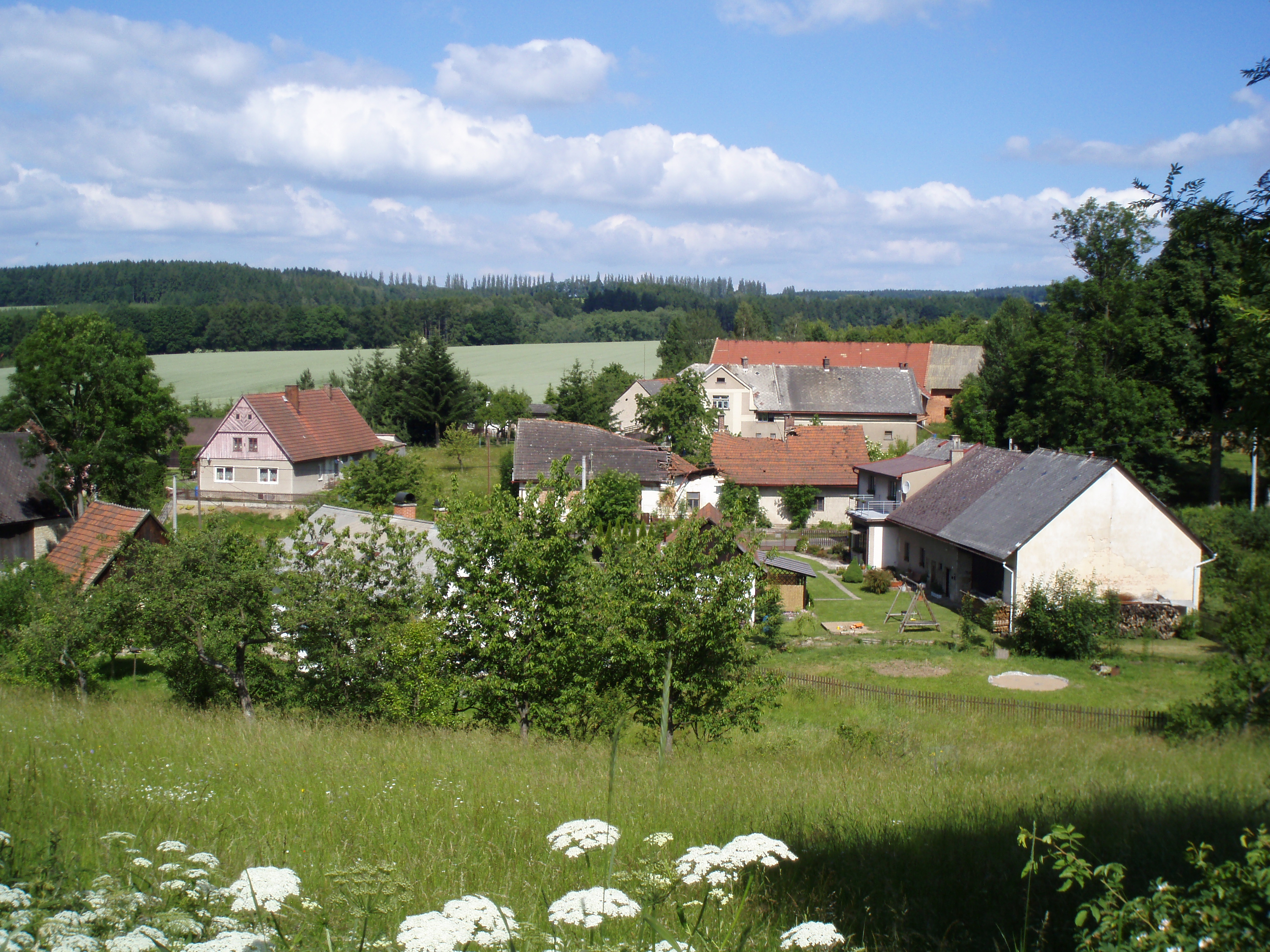
- Houses in Mezilečí

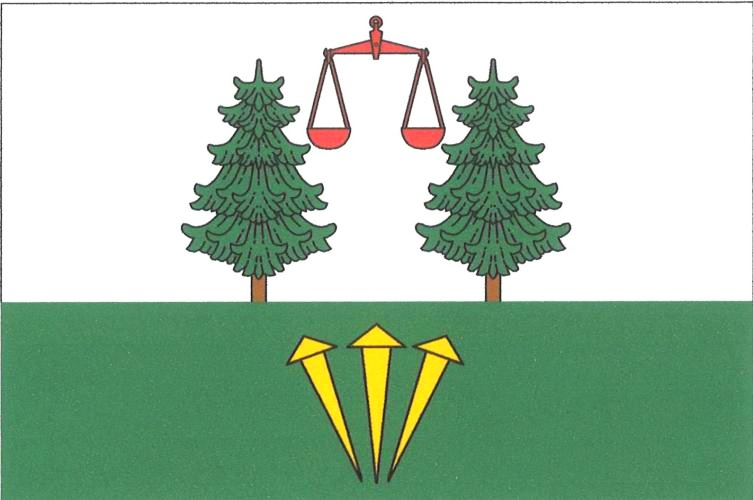
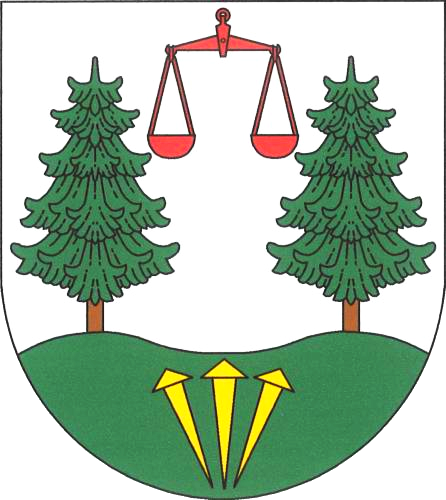
- Flag Coat of arms

- Location in the Czech Republic
- Coordinates: 50°27′12″N 15°59′0″E
- Country: Czech Republic
- Region: Hradec Králové
- District: Náchod
- First mentioned: 1495

Area
  - Total: 5.20 km^{2} (2.01 sq mi)
- Elevation: 417 m (1,368 ft)

Population (2026-01-01)
  - Total: 143
  - Density: 27.5/km^{2} (71.2/sq mi)
- Time zone: UTC+1 (CET)
  - Summer (DST): UTC+2 (CEST)
- Postal code: 552 05
- Website: www.mezileci.cz

Mezilečí (German: Mesletsch) is a municipality and village in Náchod District in the Hradec Králové Region of the Czech Republic. It has about 100 inhabitants.

== Administrative division ==
Mezilečí consists of two municipal parts (in brackets population according to the 2021 census):

- Mezilečí (116)
- Posadov (10)

== Demographics ==
Historical population
Year	Pop.	±%
1869	527	—
1880	468	−11.2%
1890	440	−6.0%
1900	400	−9.1%
1910	362	−9.5%
1921	330	−8.8%
1930	286	−13.3%
1950	232	−18.9%
1961	188	−19.0%
1970	159	−15.4%
1980	175	+10.1%
1991	139	−20.6%
2001	139	+0.0%
2011	145	+4.3%
2021	126	−13.1%
Source: Censuses
