= Náchod District =

Náchod District Okres Náchod
- District
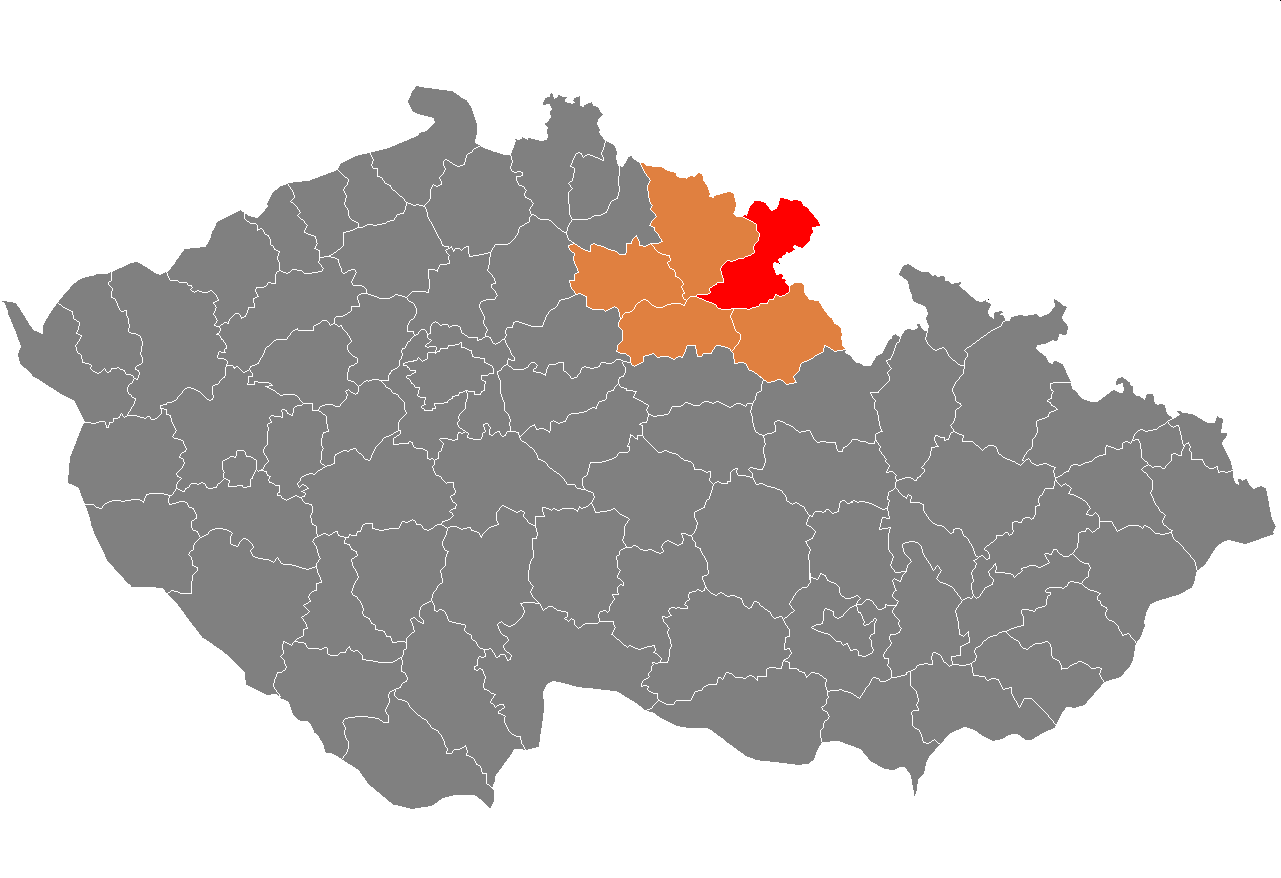
- Location in the Hradec Králové Region within the Czech Republic
- Coordinates: 50°28′N 16°9′E
- Country: Czech Republic
- Region: Hradec Králové
- Capital: Náchod

Area
  - Total: 851.77 km^{2} (328.87 sq mi)

Population (2026)
  - Total: 109,238
  - Density: 128.25/km^{2} (332.16/sq mi)
- Time zone: UTC+1 (CET)
  - Summer (DST): UTC+2 (CEST)
- Municipalities: 78
- * Towns: 11
- * Market towns: 4

Náchod District (Czech: okres Náchod) is a district in the Hradec Králové Region of the Czech Republic. Its capital is the town of Náchod.

== Administrative division ==
Náchod District is divided into four administrative districts of municipalities with extended competence: Náchod, Broumov, Jaroměř and Nové Město nad Metují.

=== List of municipalities ===
Towns are marked in bold and market towns in italics:

Adršpach – Bezděkov nad Metují – Bohuslavice – Borová – Božanov – Broumov – Brzice – Bukovice – Černčice – Červená Hora – Červený Kostelec – Česká Čermná – Česká Metuje – Česká Skalice – Chvalkovice – Dolany – Dolní Radechová – Hejtmánkovice – Heřmanice – Heřmánkovice – Horní Radechová – Hořenice – Hořičky – Hronov – Hynčice – Jaroměř – Jasenná – Jestřebí – Jetřichov – Kramolna – Křinice – Lhota pod Hořičkami – Libchyně – Litoboř – Machov – Martínkovice – Mezilečí – Mezilesí – Meziměstí – Nahořany – Náchod – Nové Město nad Metují – Nový Hrádek – Nový Ples – Otovice – Police nad Metují – Provodov-Šonov – Přibyslav – Rasošky – Rožnov – Rychnovek – Říkov – Sendraž – Šestajovice – Slatina nad Úpou – Slavětín nad Metují – Slavoňov – Šonov – Stárkov – Studnice – Suchý Důl – Teplice nad Metují – Velichovky – Velká Jesenice – Velké Petrovice – Velké Poříčí – Velký Třebešov – Vernéřovice – Vestec – Vlkov – Vršovka – Vysoká Srbská – Vysokov – Zábrodí – Zaloňov – Žďár nad Metují – Žďárky – Žernov

== Geography ==
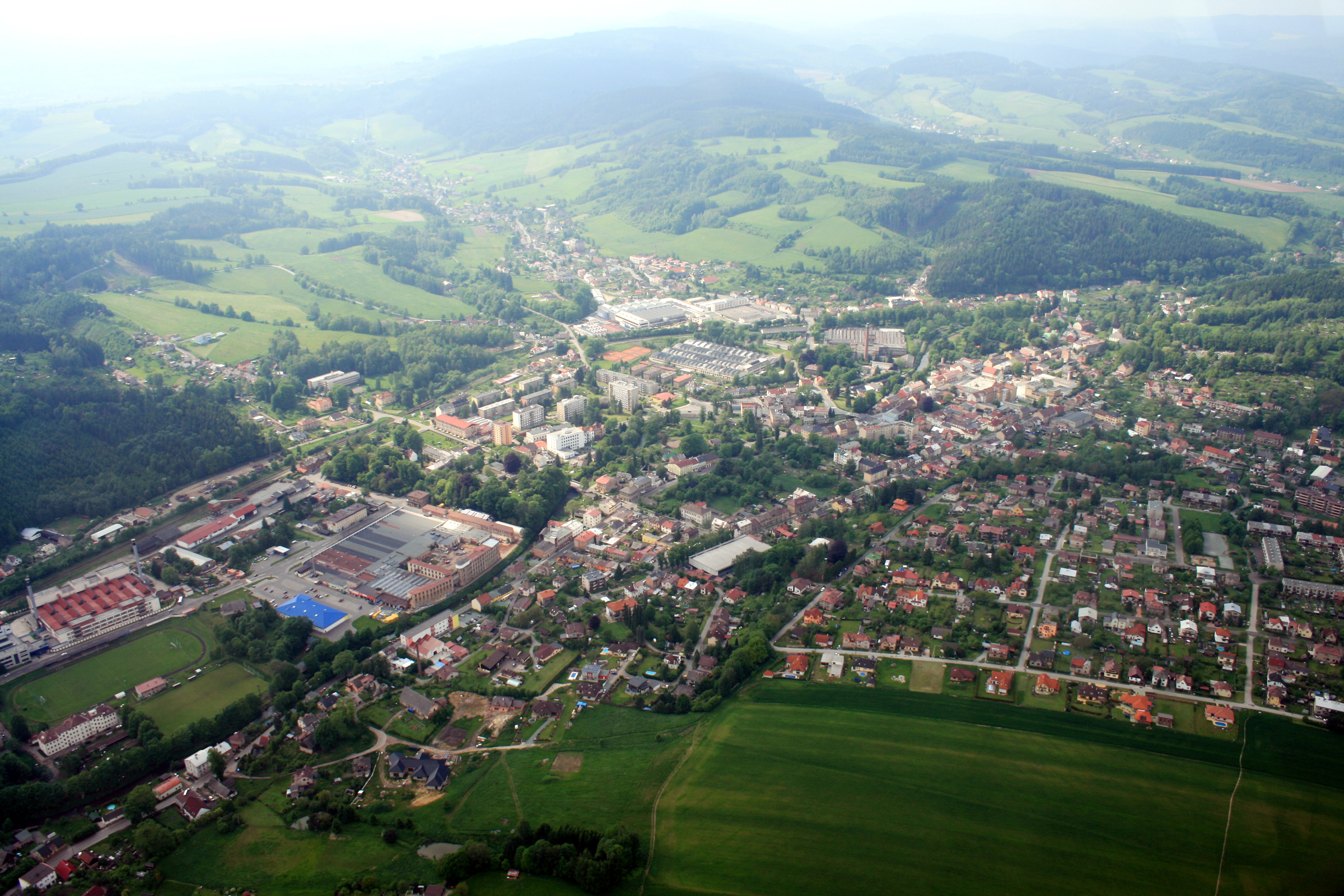
Hronov and surrounding landscape

Náchod District borders Poland in the north and east. Most of the landscape is hilly or slightly undulating and has a foothill character. The territory extends into five geomorphological mesoregions: Broumov Highlands (north), Giant Mountains Foothills (west), Orlické Foothills (southeast), Orlice Table (south) and East Elbe Table (southwest). The highest point of the district is the mountain Ruprechtický Špičák in Meziměstí with an elevation of 880 m (2,890 ft), the lowest point is the river bed of the Elbe in Jaroměř at 245 m (804 ft).

From the total district area of 851.8 km^{2} (328.9 sq mi), agricultural land occupies 521.5 km^{2} (201.4 sq mi), forests occupy 232.4 km^{2} (89.7 sq mi), and water area occupies 20.4 km^{2} (7.9 sq mi). Forests cover 27.3% of the district's area.

The Elbe River crosses the district territory in the southwest. The most important rivers of the district are its two tributaries: the Metuje, which originates here, and the Úpa. Another notable river is the Ścinawka, which flows from Poland to the district and then returns to Poland. The largest body of water is the Rozkoš Reservoir.

The northern half of the district is protected as the Broumovsko Protected Landscape Area.

== Demographics ==
Historical population

| Year | Pop. | ±% |
|---|---|---|
| 1869 | 119,718 | — |
| 1880 | 128,782 | +7.6% |
| 1890 | 135,267 | +5.0% |
| 1900 | 144,704 | +7.0% |
| 1910 | 154,534 | +6.8% |

| Year | Pop. | ±% |
|---|---|---|
| 1921 | 140,392 | −9.2% |
| 1930 | 144,323 | +2.8% |
| 1950 | 112,365 | −22.1% |
| 1961 | 113,754 | +1.2% |
| 1970 | 112,131 | −1.4% |

| Year | Pop. | ±% |
|---|---|---|
| 1980 | 114,031 | +1.7% |
| 1991 | 111,939 | −1.8% |
| 2001 | 112,714 | +0.7% |
| 2011 | 109,550 | −2.8% |
| 2021 | 105,314 | −3.9% |

Source: Censuses

=== Most populous municipalities ===
| Name | Population | Area (km^{2}) |
|---|---|---|
| Náchod | 19,649 | 33 |
| Jaroměř | 12,487 | 24 |
| Nové Město nad Metují | 9,165 | 23 |
| Červený Kostelec | 8,202 | 24 |
| Broumov | 6,998 | 22 |
| Hronov | 6,063 | 22 |
| Česká Skalice | 4,970 | 17 |
| Police nad Metují | 4,164 | 24 |
| Velké Poříčí | 2,310 | 7 |
| Meziměstí | 2,283 | 26 |

== Economy ==
The largest employers with headquarters in Náchod District and at least 500 employees are:

| Economic entity | Location | Number of employees | Main activity |
|---|---|---|---|
| Regional Hospital Náchod | Náchod | 2,000–2,499 | Health care |
| Vebatrade-Plus | Broumov | 500–999 | Textile industry |
| Veba | Broumov | 500–999 | Textile industry |
| Saar Gummi Czech | Červený Kostelec | 500–999 | Manufacture of rubber products |
| ATAS elektromotory Náchod | Náchod | 500–999 | Manufacture of electric motors |
| Rubena | Náchod | 500–999 | Manufacture of rubber products |
| Ammann Czech Republic | Nové Město nad Metují | 500–999 | Manufacture of machinery |
| Hronovský | Nové Město nad Metují | 500–999 | Automotive industry |
| Hauk | Police nad Metují | 500–999 | Automotive industry |

== Transport ==
The D11 motorway (part of the European route E67) from Prague via Hradec Králové ends in the district. The E67 further continues as the I/33 road to the Czech–Polish border.

== Sights ==
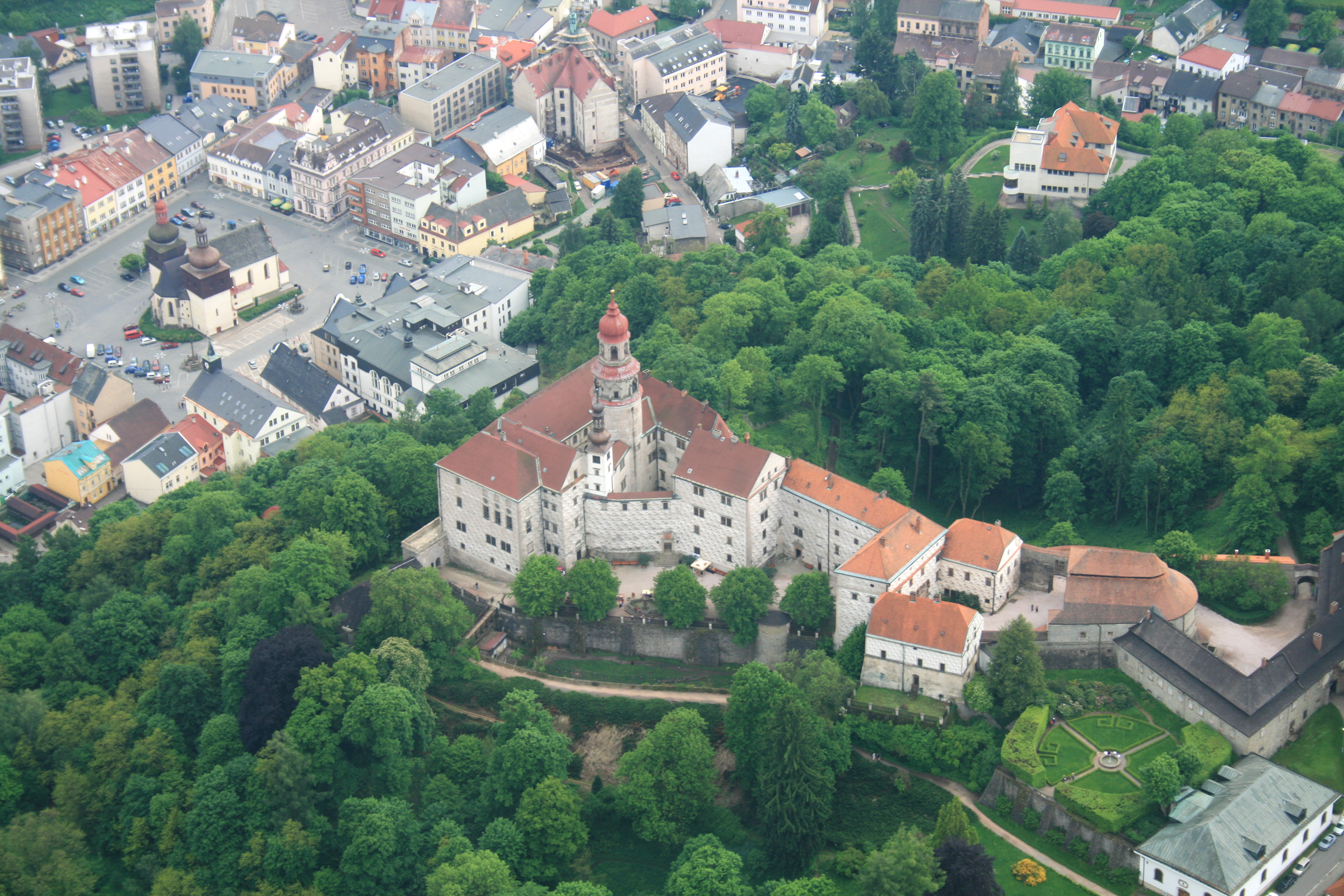
Náchod Castle

The most important monuments in the district, protected as national cultural monuments, are:

- Babiččino údolí with Ratibořice Castle in Česká Skalice
- Broumov Monastery and Church of Saint Adalbert
- Dobrošov fortress system
- Náchod Castle
- Nové Město nad Metují Castle
- Church of the Virgin Mary in Broumov
- Church of Saint John the Baptist in Slavoňov
- Schlick Jewelry Box
- Wenke's department store, today Town Museum in Jaroměř
- Church of Saint Procopius in Bezděkov nad Metují
- Church of Saint Mary Magdalene in Božanov
- Church of Saint Wenceslaus in Broumov
- Church of All Saints in Heřmánkovice
- Chapel of Our Lady of the Snows in Hlavňov
- Church of Saint Barbara in Otovice
- Church of Saint James the Great in Ruprechtice
- Church of Saint Margaret in Šonov
- Church of Saint Michael the Archangel in Vernéřovice
- Church of Saint Anne in Vižňov
- Church of Saints George and Martin in Martínkovice

The best-preserved settlements and landscapes, protected as monument reservations and monument zones, are:

- Josefov (monument reservation)
- Nové Město nad Metují (monument reservation)
- Křinice (monument reservation)
- Broumov
- Jaroměř
- Náchod
- Police nad Metují
- Stárkov
- Skalka

The most visited tourist destination are the Adršpach-Teplice Rocks.
