= Vlkov (Náchod District) =

- Municipality
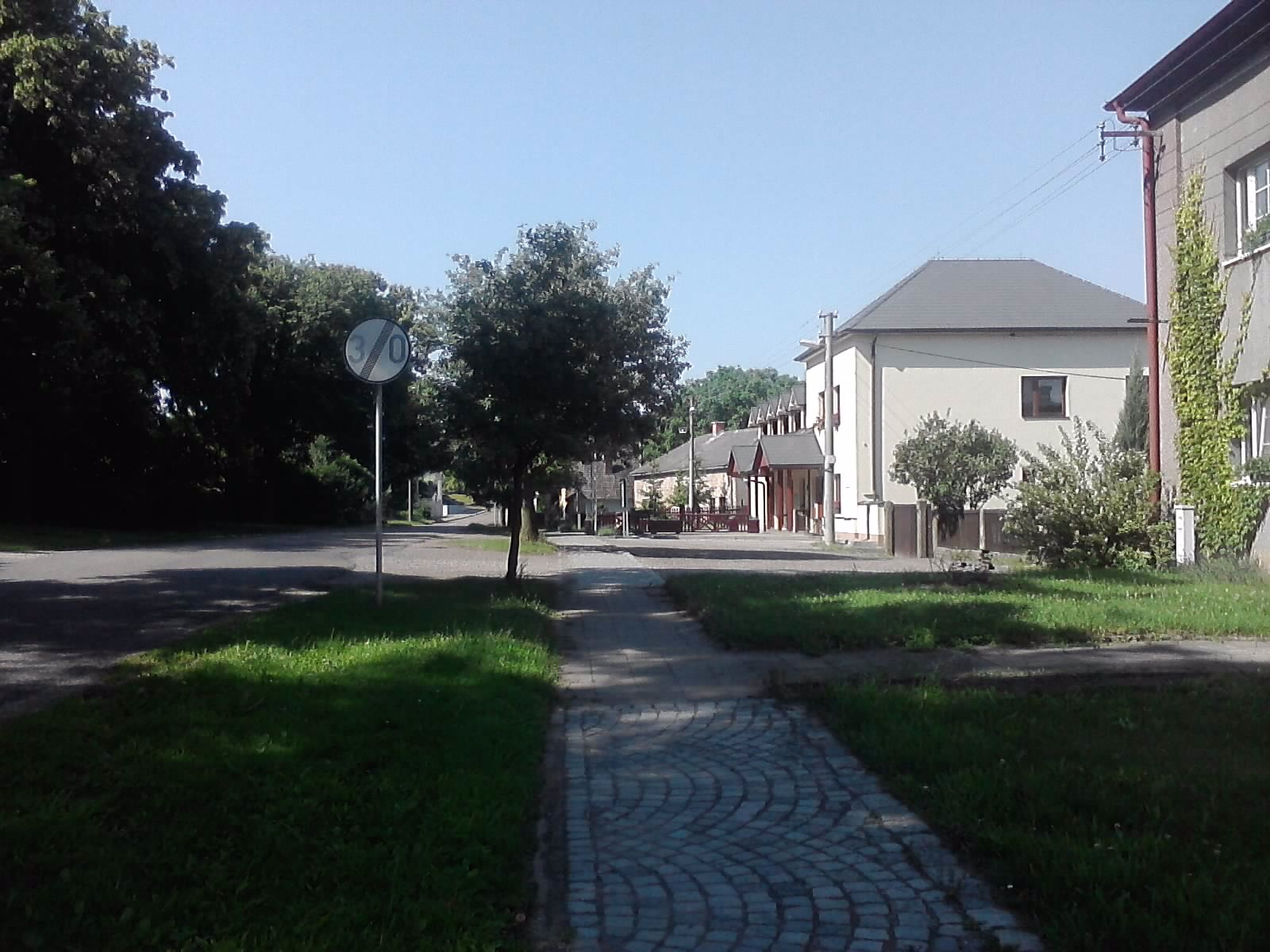
- Municipal office

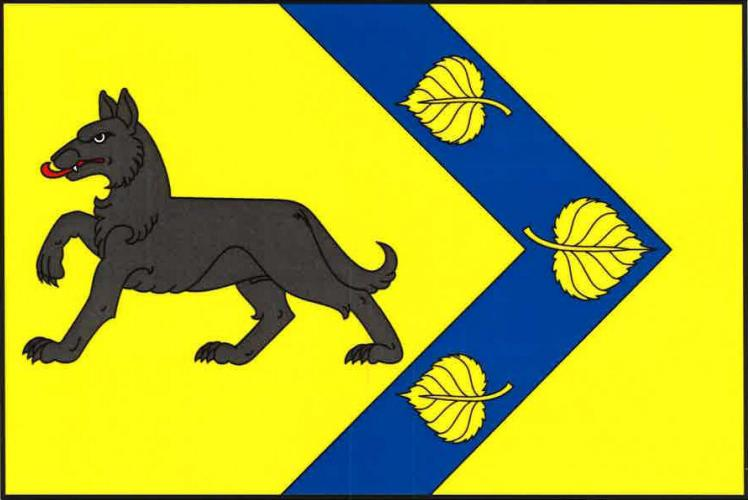
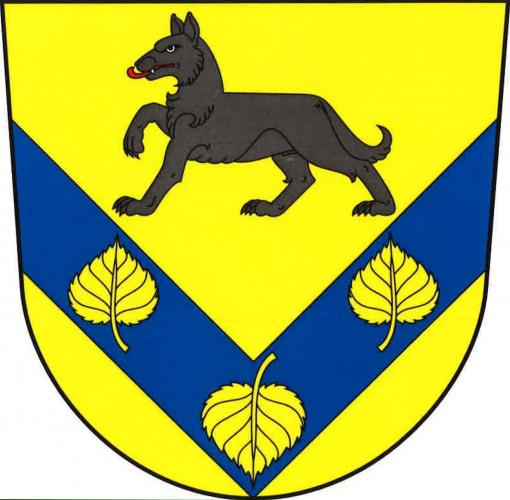
- Flag Coat of arms

- Location in the Czech Republic
- Coordinates: 50°18′46″N 15°53′54″E
- Country: Czech Republic
- Region: Hradec Králové
- District: Náchod
- First mentioned: 1546

Area
  - Total: 5.26 km^{2} (2.03 sq mi)
- Elevation: 255 m (837 ft)

Population (2026-01-01)
  - Total: 379
  - Density: 72.1/km^{2} (187/sq mi)
- Time zone: UTC+1 (CET)
  - Summer (DST): UTC+2 (CEST)
- Postal code: 551 01
- Website: www.obecvlkov.cz

Vlkov is a municipality and village in Náchod District in the Hradec Králové Region of the Czech Republic. It has about 400 inhabitants.

== Demographics ==
Historical population
Year	Pop.	±%
1869	523	—
1880	591	+13.0%
1890	574	−2.9%
1900	577	+0.5%
1910	535	−7.3%
1921	518	−3.2%
1930	529	+2.1%
1950	409	−22.7%
1961	414	+1.2%
1970	426	+2.9%
1980	411	−3.5%
1991	348	−15.3%
2001	333	−4.3%
2011	388	+16.5%
2021	374	−3.6%
Source: Censuses
