= Vysoká Srbská =

- Municipality
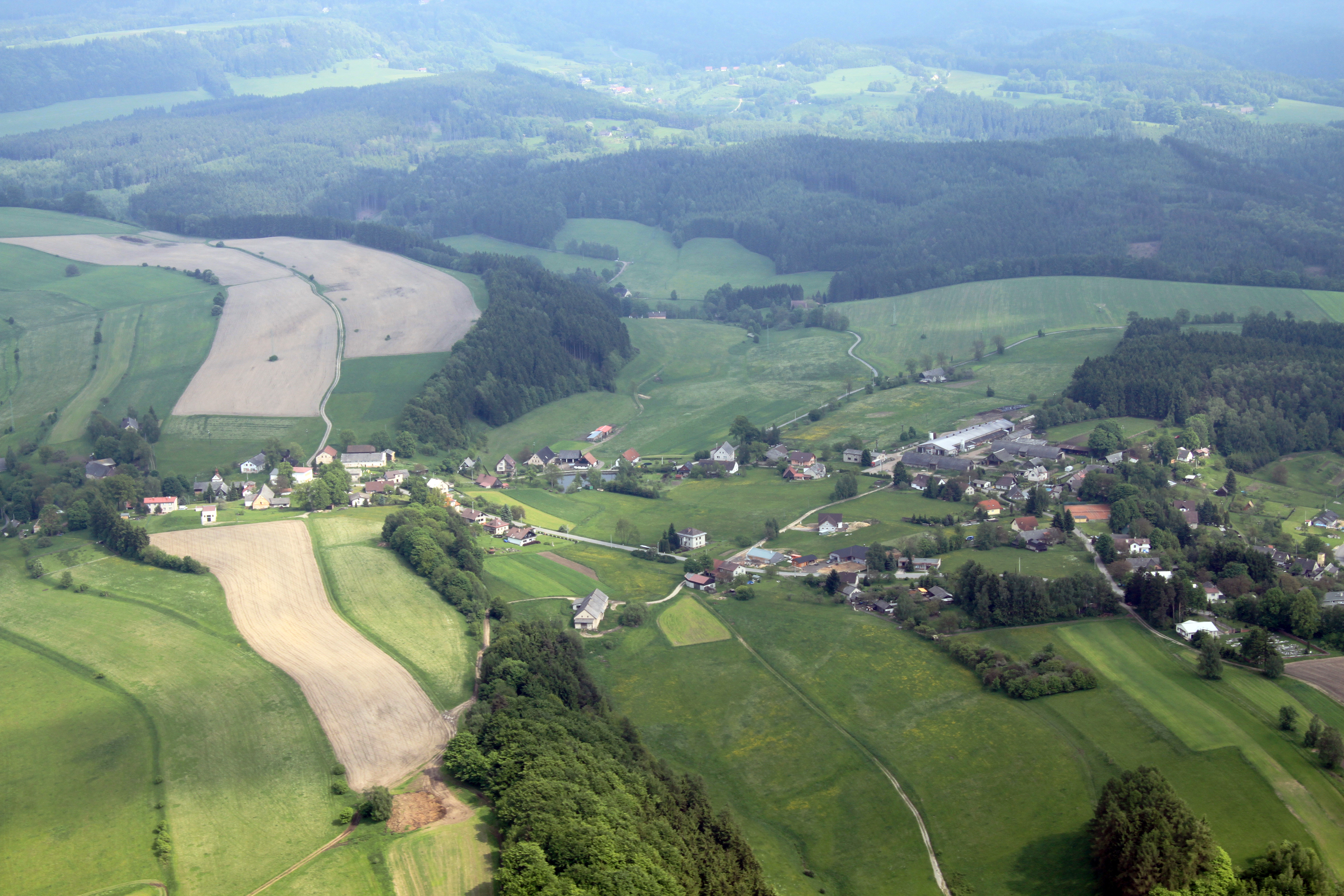
- Aerial view

- Flag Coat of arms

- Location in the Czech Republic
- Coordinates: 50°29′16″N 16°13′40″E
- Country: Czech Republic
- Region: Hradec Králové
- District: Náchod
- First mentioned: 1406

Area
  - Total: 7.45 km^{2} (2.88 sq mi)
- Elevation: 474 m (1,555 ft)

Population (2026-01-01)
  - Total: 290
  - Density: 39/km^{2} (100/sq mi)
- Time zone: UTC+1 (CET)
  - Summer (DST): UTC+2 (CEST)
- Postal code: 549 31
- Website: www.vysokasrbska.cz

Vysoká Srbská (German: Hochsichel) is a municipality and village in Náchod District in the Hradec Králové Region of the Czech Republic. It has about 300 inhabitants. It is located on the border with Poland.

== Administrative division ==
Vysoká Srbská consists of three municipal parts (in brackets population according to the 2021 census):

- Vysoká Srbská (187)
- Závrchy (3)
- Zlíčko (91)

== Demographics ==
Historical population
Year	Pop.	±%
1869	769	—
1880	862	+12.1%
1890	864	+0.2%
1900	801	−7.3%
1910	786	−1.9%
1921	634	−19.3%
1930	550	−13.2%
1950	430	−21.8%
1961	403	−6.3%
1970	327	−18.9%
1980	291	−11.0%
1991	257	−11.7%
2001	260	+1.2%
2011	241	−7.3%
2021	281	+16.6%
Source: Censuses
