= Velký Třebešov =

- Municipality
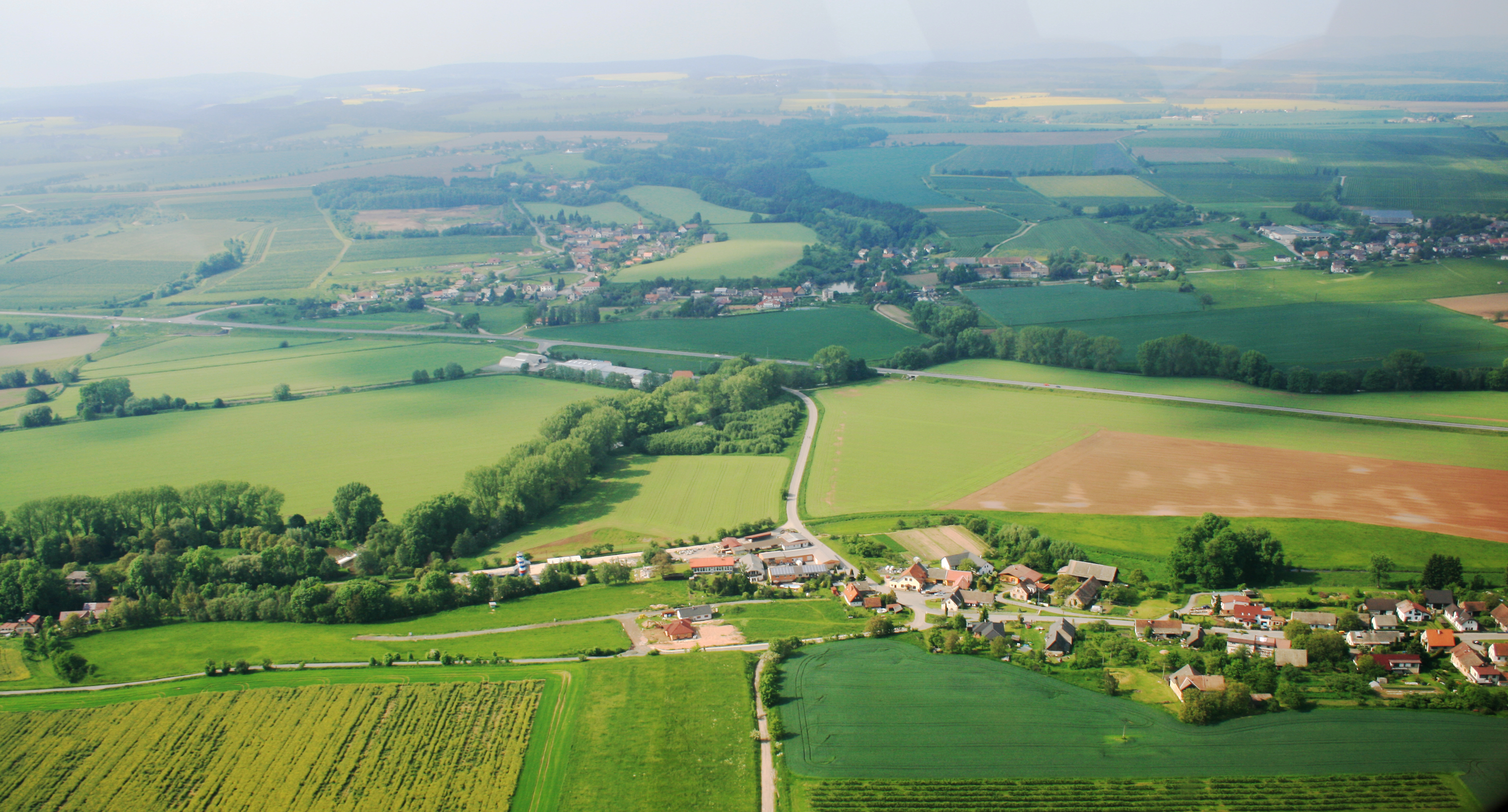
- Říkov and Velký Třebešov in the background

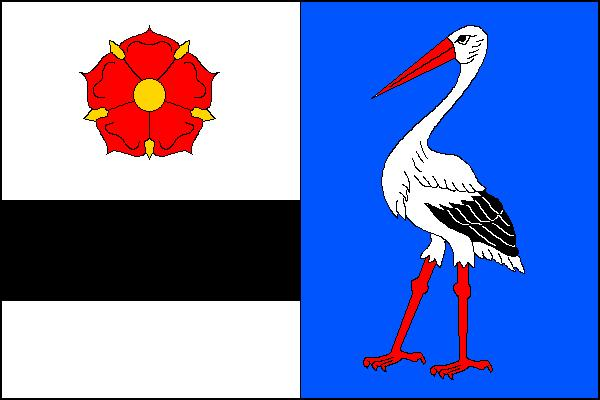
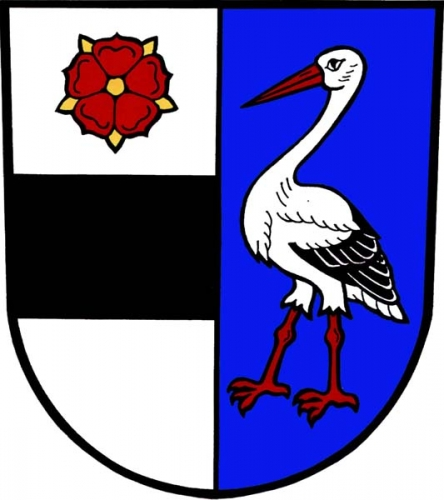
- Flag Coat of arms

- Location in the Czech Republic
- Coordinates: 50°23′35″N 16°0′23″E
- Country: Czech Republic
- Region: Hradec Králové
- District: Náchod
- First mentioned: 1355

Area
  - Total: 3.14 km^{2} (1.21 sq mi)
- Elevation: 289 m (948 ft)

Population (2026-01-01)
  - Total: 316
  - Density: 101/km^{2} (261/sq mi)
- Time zone: UTC+1 (CET)
  - Summer (DST): UTC+2 (CEST)
- Postal code: 552 02
- Website: www.velkytrebesov.cz

Velký Třebešov is a municipality and village in Náchod District in the Hradec Králové Region of the Czech Republic. It has about 300 inhabitants.

== Demographics ==
Historical population
Year	Pop.	±%
1869	458	—
1880	506	+10.5%
1890	552	+9.1%
1900	700	+26.8%
1910	658	−6.0%
1921	485	−26.3%
1930	530	+9.3%
1950	377	−28.9%
1961	417	+10.6%
1970	389	−6.7%
1980	337	−13.4%
1991	339	+0.6%
2001	325	−4.1%
2011	337	+3.7%
2021	313	−7.1%
Source: Censuses
