= Vršovka =

- Municipality
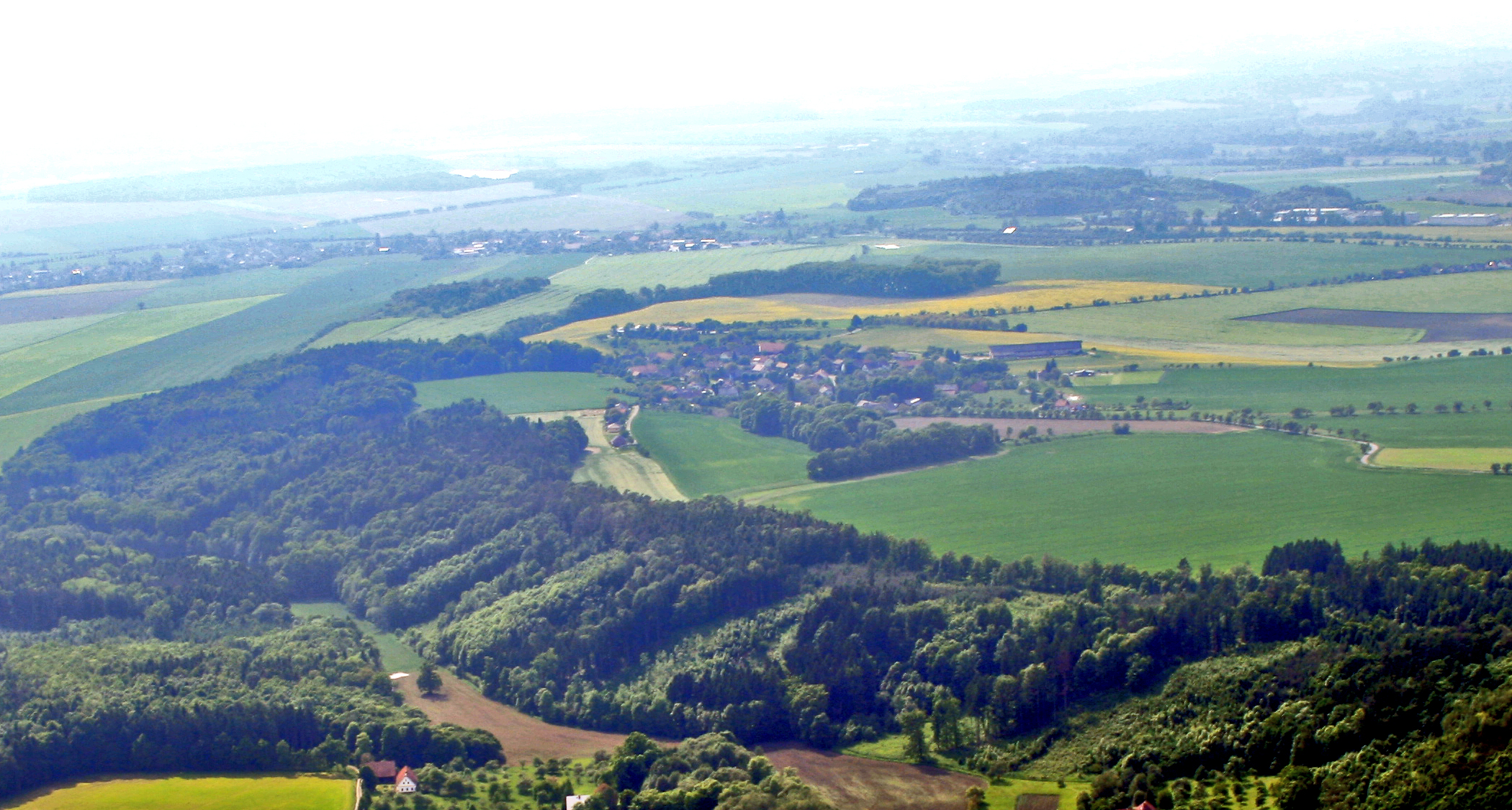
- Aerial view

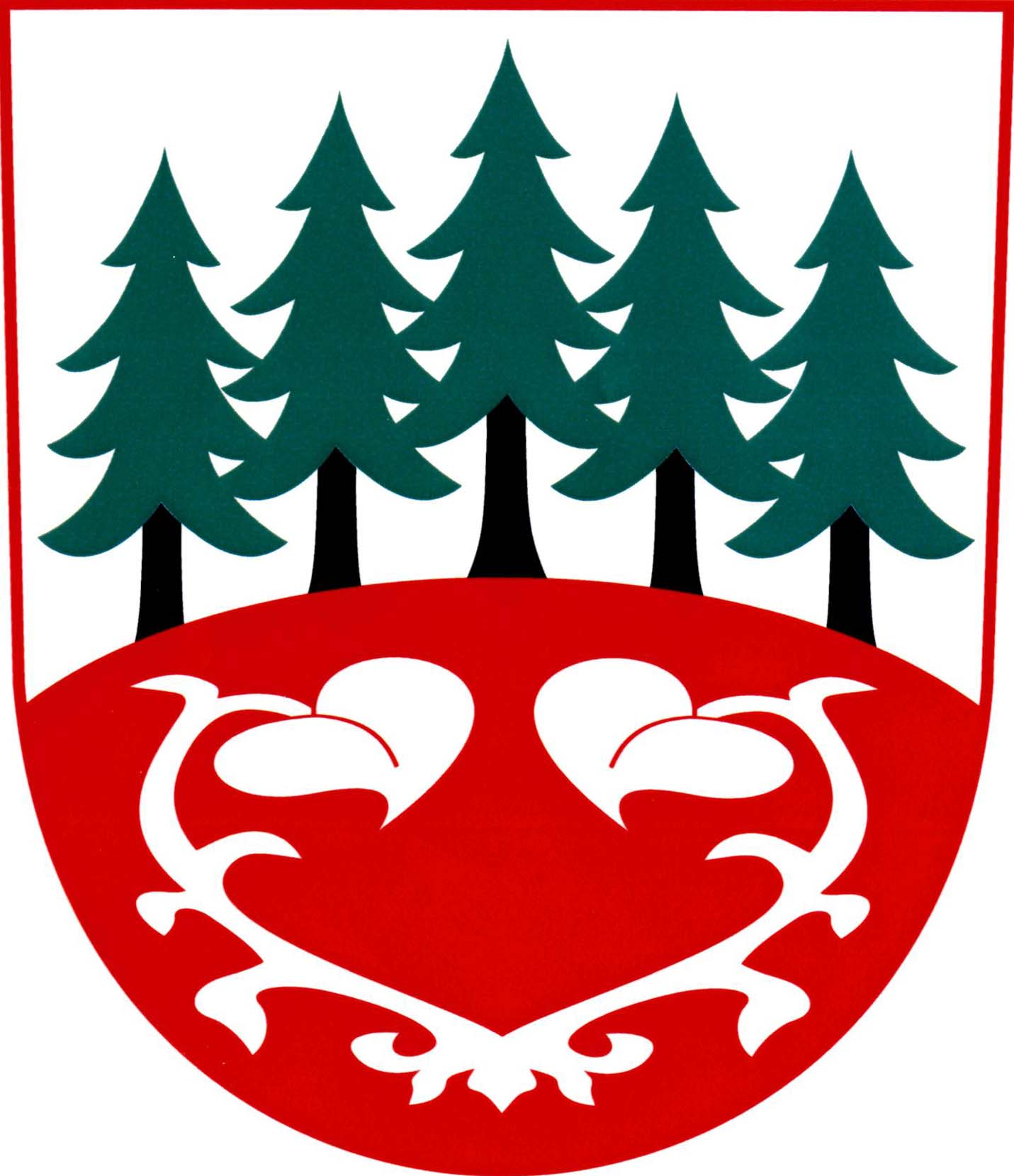
- Flag Coat of arms

- Location in the Czech Republic
- Coordinates: 50°19′24″N 16°7′13″E
- Country: Czech Republic
- Region: Hradec Králové
- District: Náchod
- First mentioned: 1527

Area
  - Total: 2.17 km^{2} (0.84 sq mi)
- Elevation: 332 m (1,089 ft)

Population (2026-01-01)
  - Total: 148
  - Density: 68.2/km^{2} (177/sq mi)
- Time zone: UTC+1 (CET)
  - Summer (DST): UTC+2 (CEST)
- Postal code: 549 01
- Website: www.vrsovka.cz

Vršovka is a municipality and village in Náchod District in the Hradec Králové Region of the Czech Republic. It has about 100 inhabitants.

== Demographics ==
Historical population
Year	Pop.	±%
1869	226	—
1880	219	−3.1%
1890	205	−6.4%
1900	204	−0.5%
1910	207	+1.5%
1921	203	−1.9%
1930	218	+7.4%
1950	150	−31.2%
1961	130	−13.3%
1970	134	+3.1%
1980	127	−5.2%
1991	109	−14.2%
2001	109	+0.0%
2011	118	+8.3%
2021	137	+16.1%
Source: Censuses
