= Kramolna =

- Municipality
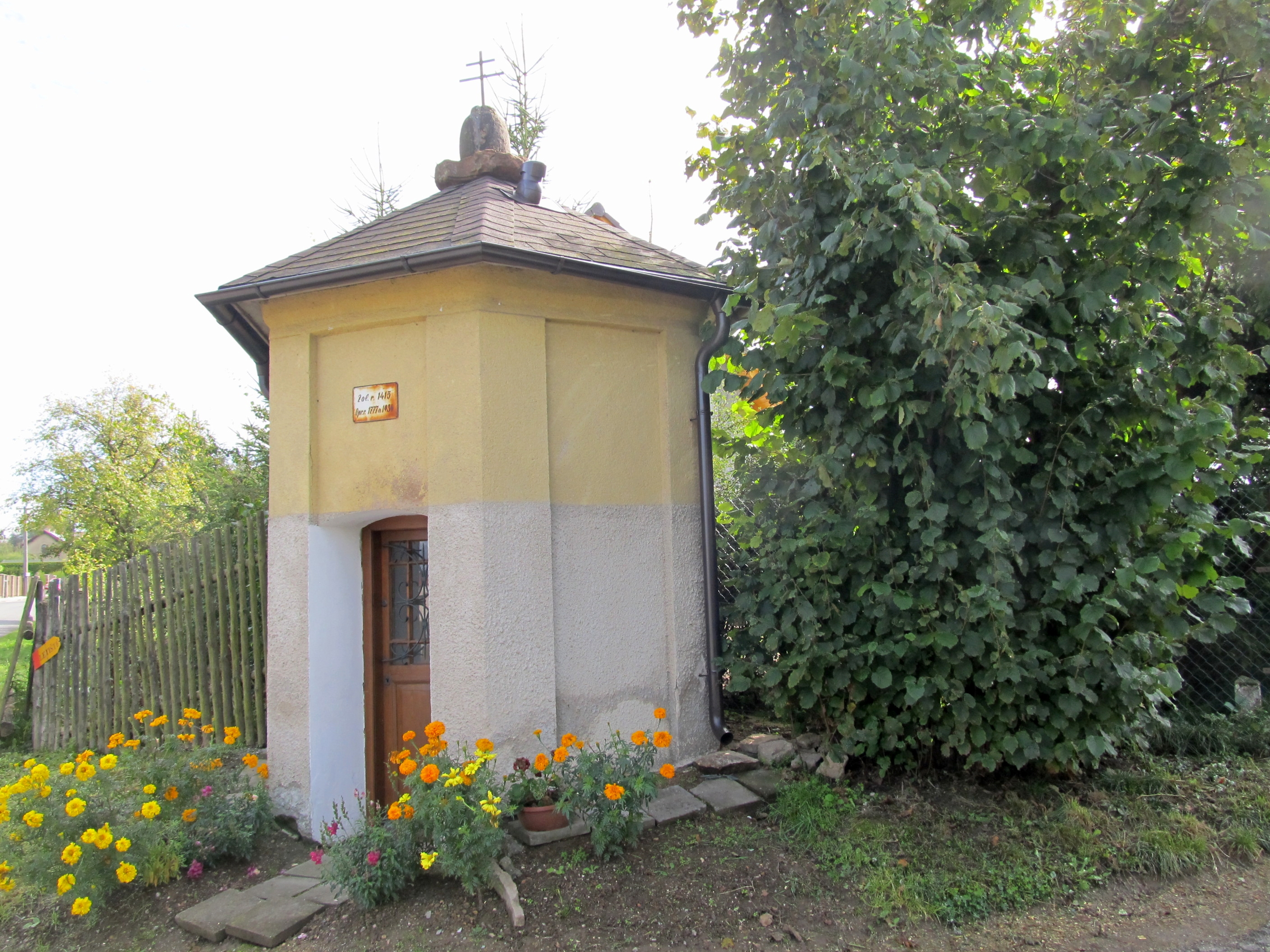
- Chapel of the Virgin Mary

- Flag Coat of arms

- Location in the Czech Republic
- Coordinates: 50°25′15″N 16°8′6″E
- Country: Czech Republic
- Region: Hradec Králové
- District: Náchod
- First mentioned: 1415

Area
  - Total: 6.99 km^{2} (2.70 sq mi)
- Elevation: 457 m (1,499 ft)

Population (2026-01-01)
  - Total: 1,059
  - Density: 152/km^{2} (392/sq mi)
- Time zone: UTC+1 (CET)
  - Summer (DST): UTC+2 (CEST)
- Postal code: 547 01
- Website: www.kramolna.cz

Kramolna is a municipality and village in Náchod District in the Hradec Králové Region of the Czech Republic. It has about 1,100 inhabitants.

== Administrative division ==
Kramolna consists of three municipal parts (in brackets population according to the 2021 census):

- Kramolna (752)
- Lhotky (121)
- Trubějov (131)

== Demographics ==
Historical population
Year	Pop.	±%
1869	1,010	—
1880	907	−10.2%
1890	1,024	+12.9%
1900	1,199	+17.1%
1910	1,252	+4.4%
1921	860	−31.3%
1930	962	+11.9%
1950	643	−33.2%
1961	796	+23.8%
1970	789	−0.9%
1980	748	−5.2%
1991	781	+4.4%
2001	896	+14.7%
2011	1,011	+12.8%
2021	1,004	−0.7%
Source: Censuses
