= Libchyně =

- Municipality
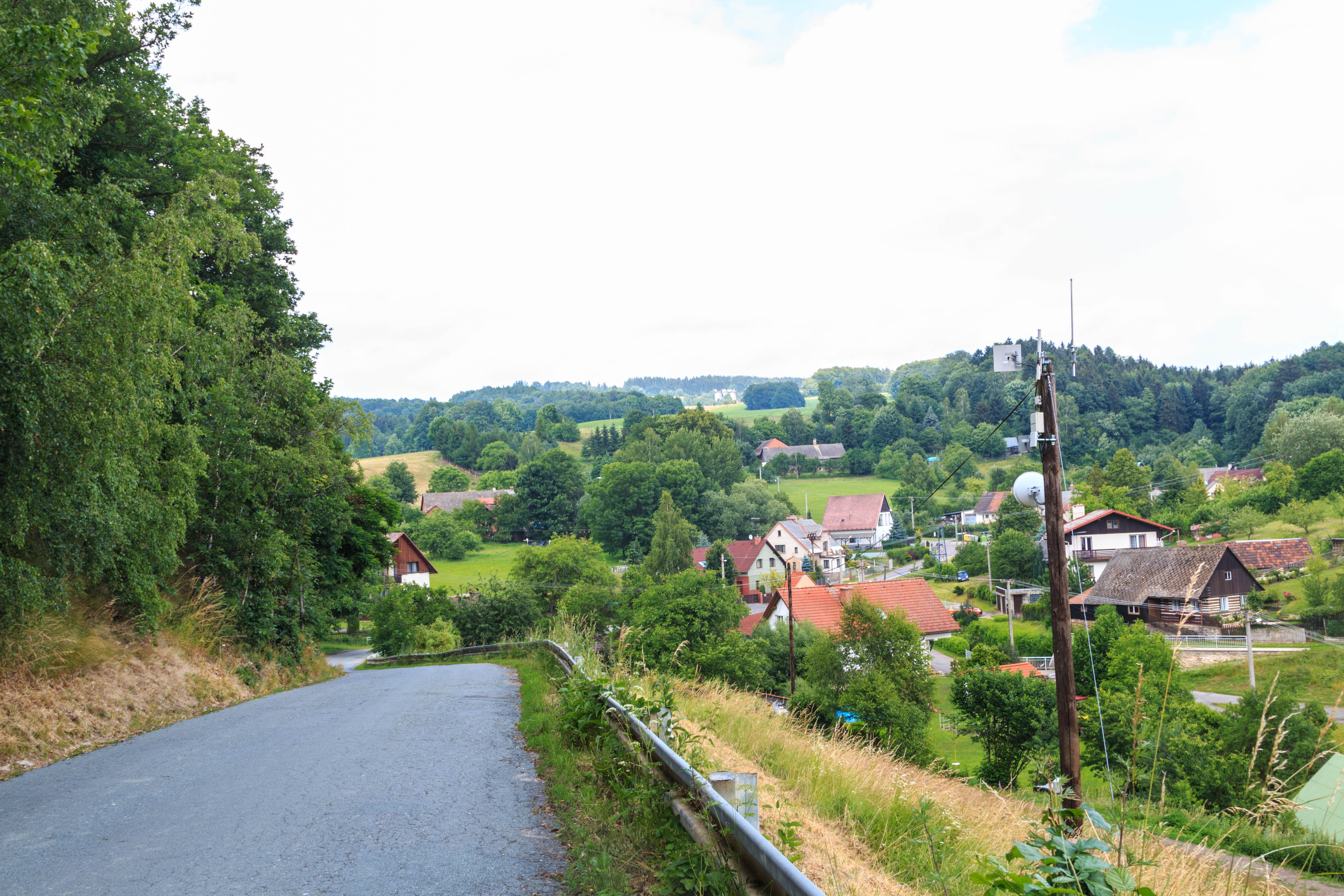
- View from the west

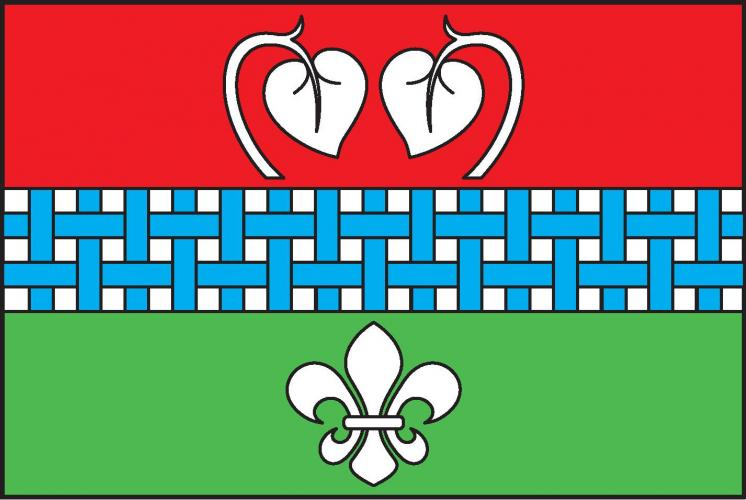
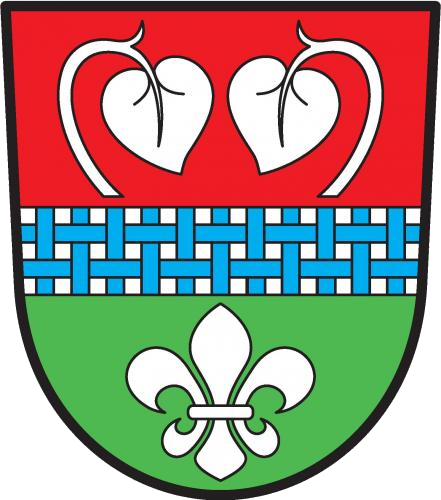
- Flag Coat of arms

- Location in the Czech Republic
- Coordinates: 50°21′25″N 16°11′27″E
- Country: Czech Republic
- Region: Hradec Králové
- District: Náchod
- First mentioned: 1459

Area
  - Total: 1.19 km^{2} (0.46 sq mi)
- Elevation: 408 m (1,339 ft)

Population (2026-01-01)
  - Total: 74
  - Density: 62/km^{2} (160/sq mi)
- Time zone: UTC+1 (CET)
  - Summer (DST): UTC+2 (CEST)
- Postal code: 549 01
- Website: www.libchyne.cz

Libchyně is a municipality and village in Náchod District in the Hradec Králové Region of the Czech Republic. It has about 70 inhabitants.

== Demographics ==
Historical population
Year	Pop.	±%
1869	310	—
1880	274	−11.6%
1890	284	+3.6%
1900	274	−3.5%
1910	248	−9.5%
1921	228	−8.1%
1930	222	−2.6%
1950	191	−14.0%
1961	176	−7.9%
1970	137	−22.2%
1980	97	−29.2%
1991	71	−26.8%
2001	68	−4.2%
2011	61	−10.3%
2021	61	+0.0%
Source: Censuses
