= Hořenice =

- Municipality
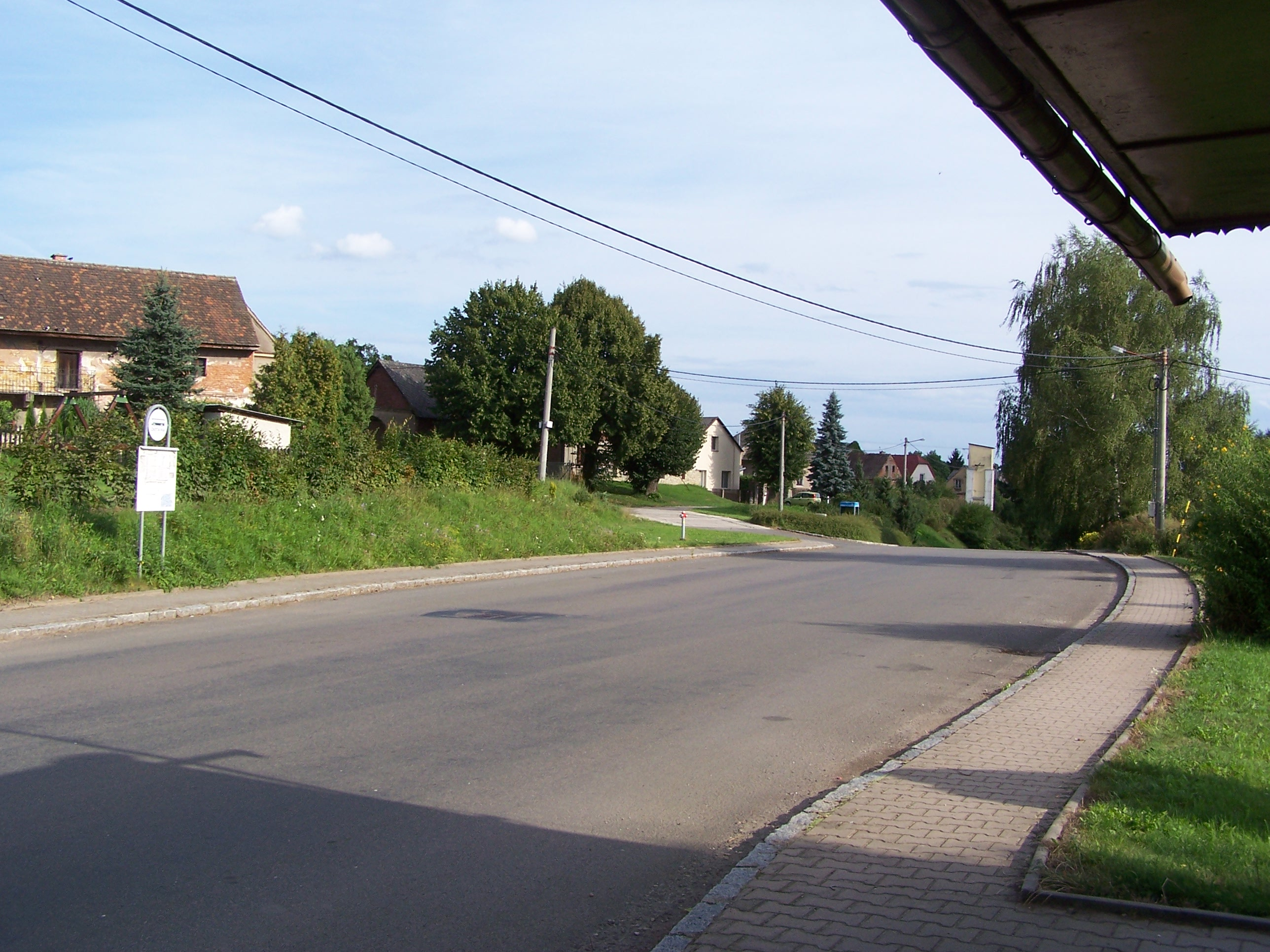
- Main road

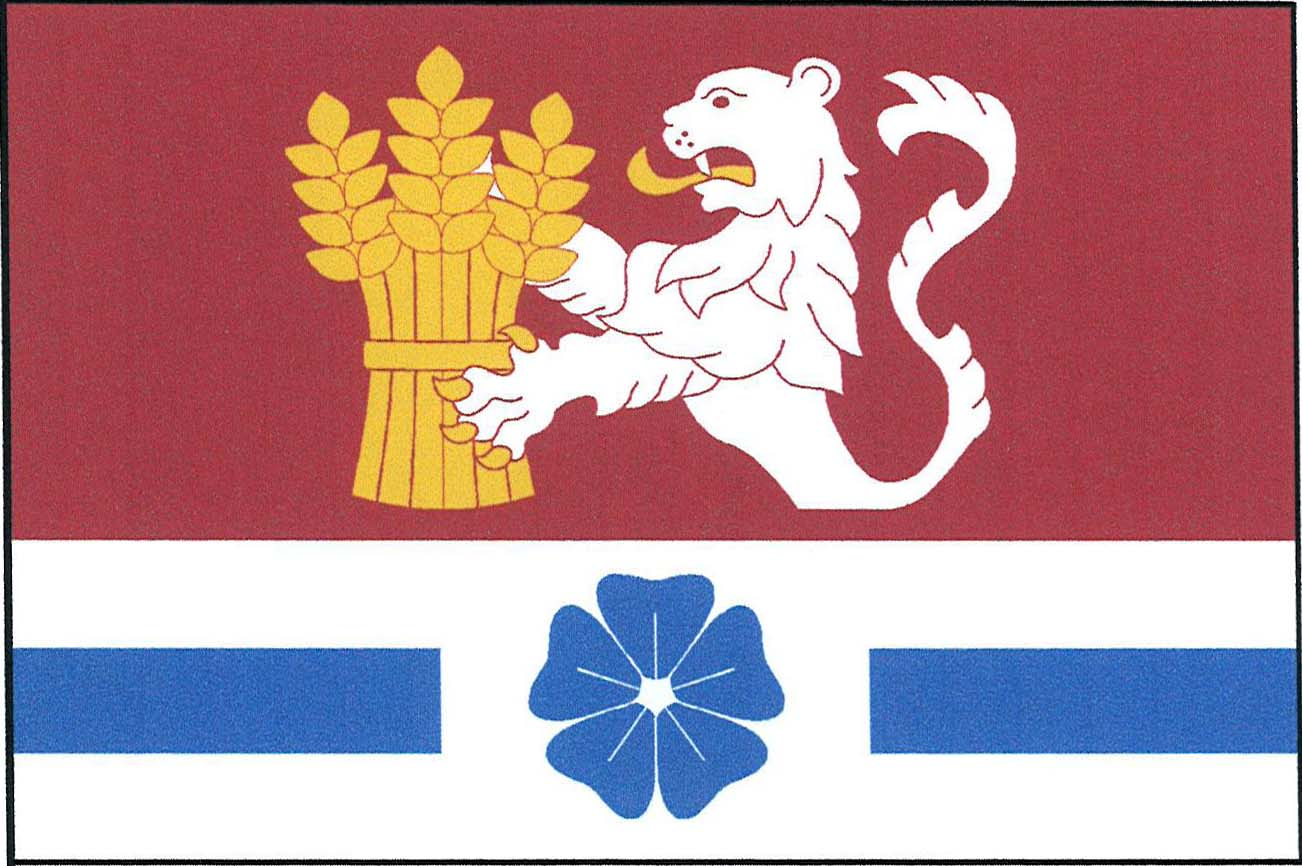
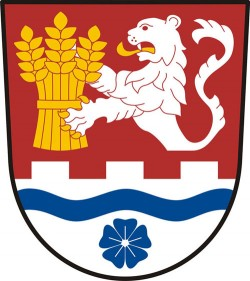
- Flag Coat of arms

- Location in the Czech Republic
- Coordinates: 50°22′9″N 15°54′39″E
- Country: Czech Republic
- Region: Hradec Králové
- District: Náchod
- First mentioned: 1500

Area
  - Total: 3.27 km^{2} (1.26 sq mi)
- Elevation: 266 m (873 ft)

Population (2026-01-01)
  - Total: 152
  - Density: 46.5/km^{2} (120/sq mi)
- Time zone: UTC+1 (CET)
  - Summer (DST): UTC+2 (CEST)
- Postal code: 551 01
- Website: www.horenice.cz

Hořenice is a municipality and village in Náchod District in the Hradec Králové Region of the Czech Republic. It has about 200 inhabitants.

== History ==
The first written mention of Hořenice is from 1500.

== Demographics ==
Historical population
Year	Pop.	±%
1869	310	—
1880	351	+13.2%
1890	379	+8.0%
1900	462	+21.9%
1910	483	+4.5%
1921	461	−4.6%
1930	453	−1.7%
1950	327	−27.8%
1961	292	−10.7%
1970	241	−17.5%
1980	192	−20.3%
1991	183	−4.7%
2001	171	−6.6%
2011	161	−5.8%
2021	152	−5.6%
Source: Censuses
