= Borová (Náchod District) =

- Municipality
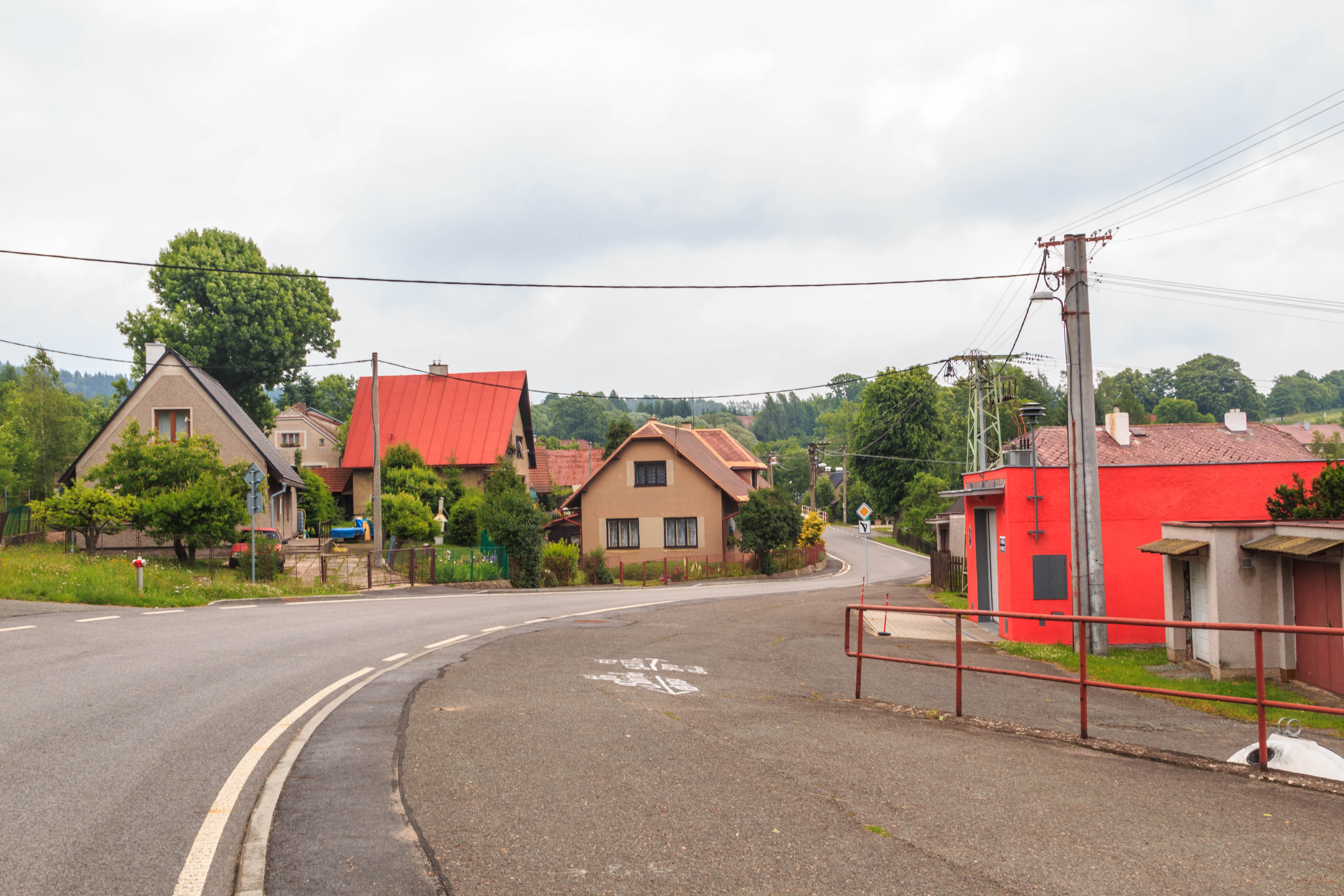
- Main road

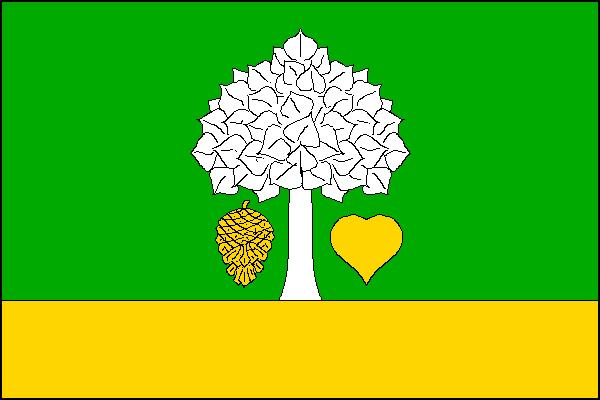
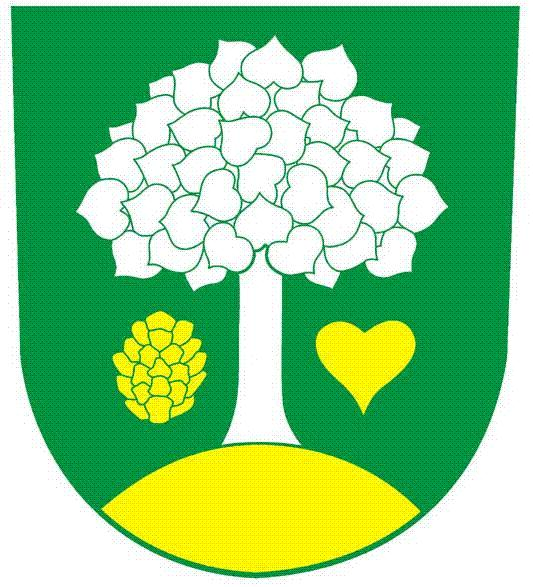
- Flag Coat of arms

- Location in the Czech Republic
- Coordinates: 50°23′10″N 16°15′12″E
- Country: Czech Republic
- Region: Hradec Králové
- District: Náchod
- First mentioned: 1445

Area
  - Total: 3.07 km^{2} (1.19 sq mi)
- Elevation: 630 m (2,070 ft)

Population (2026-01-01)
  - Total: 215
  - Density: 70.0/km^{2} (181/sq mi)
- Time zone: UTC+1 (CET)
  - Summer (DST): UTC+2 (CEST)
- Postal code: 547 01
- Website: www.borovaunachoda.cz

Borová is a municipality and village in Náchod District in the Hradec Králové Region of the Czech Republic. It has about 200 inhabitants.

== Demographics ==
Historical population
Year	Pop.	±%
1869	917	—
1880	985	+7.4%
1890	945	−4.1%
1900	850	−10.1%
1910	766	−9.9%
1921	706	−7.8%
1930	555	−21.4%
1950	388	−30.1%
1961	354	−8.8%
1970	314	−11.3%
1980	233	−25.8%
1991	226	−3.0%
2001	178	−21.2%
2011	196	+10.1%
2021	196	+0.0%
Source: Censuses
