= Mezilesí (Náchod District) =

- Municipality
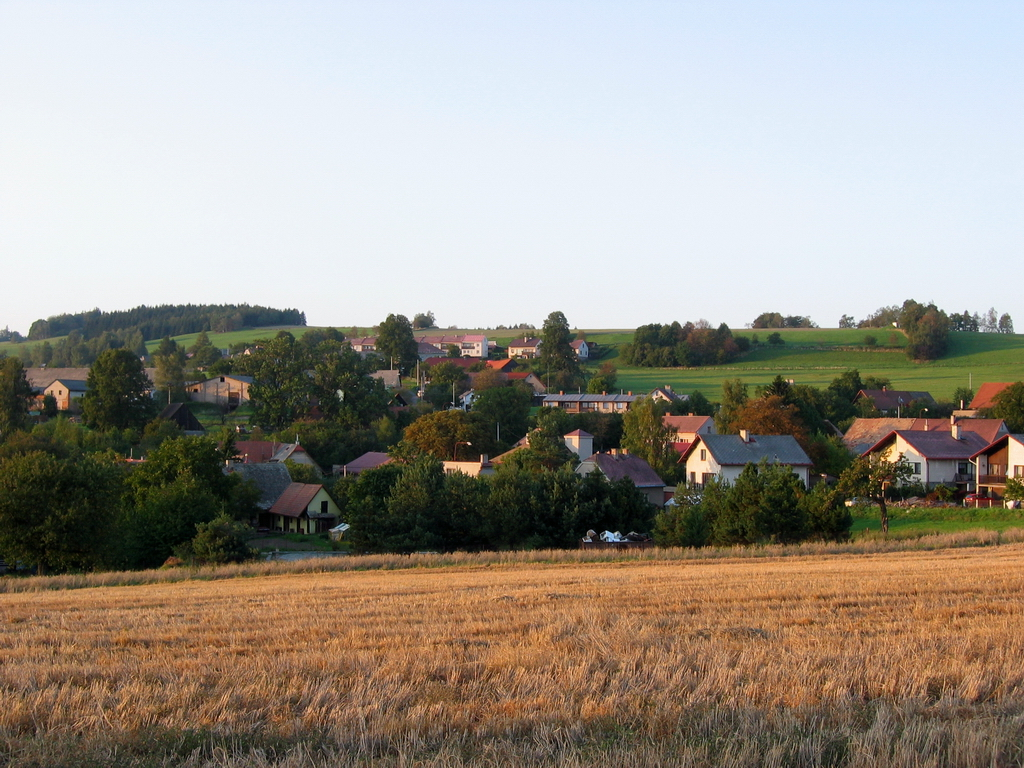
- General view

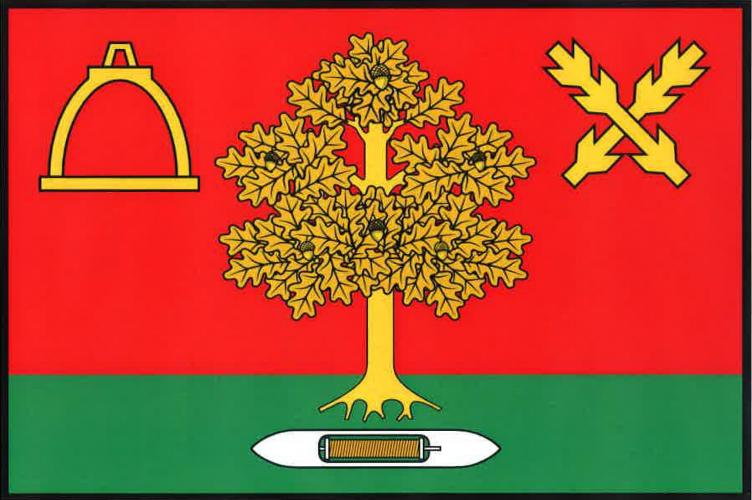
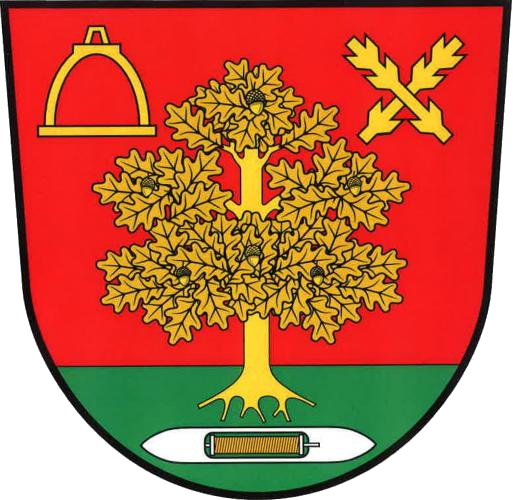
- Flag Coat of arms

- Location in the Czech Republic
- Coordinates: 50°21′22″N 16°13′1″E
- Country: Czech Republic
- Region: Hradec Králové
- District: Náchod
- First mentioned: 1403

Area
  - Total: 2.36 km^{2} (0.91 sq mi)
- Elevation: 504 m (1,654 ft)

Population (2026-01-01)
  - Total: 243
  - Density: 103/km^{2} (267/sq mi)
- Time zone: UTC+1 (CET)
  - Summer (DST): UTC+2 (CEST)
- Postal code: 549 23
- Website: www.mezilesi.cz

Mezilesí (German: Metzles) is a municipality and village in Náchod District in the Hradec Králové Region of the Czech Republic. It has about 200 inhabitants.

== Demographics ==
Historical population
Year	Pop.	±%
1869	558	—
1880	532	−4.7%
1890	529	−0.6%
1900	480	−9.3%
1910	464	−3.3%
1921	437	−5.8%
1930	366	−16.2%
1950	280	−23.5%
1961	279	−0.4%
1970	264	−5.4%
1980	225	−14.8%
1991	208	−7.6%
2001	204	−1.9%
2011	207	+1.5%
2021	222	+7.2%
Source: Censuses
