= Slavoňov =

- Municipality
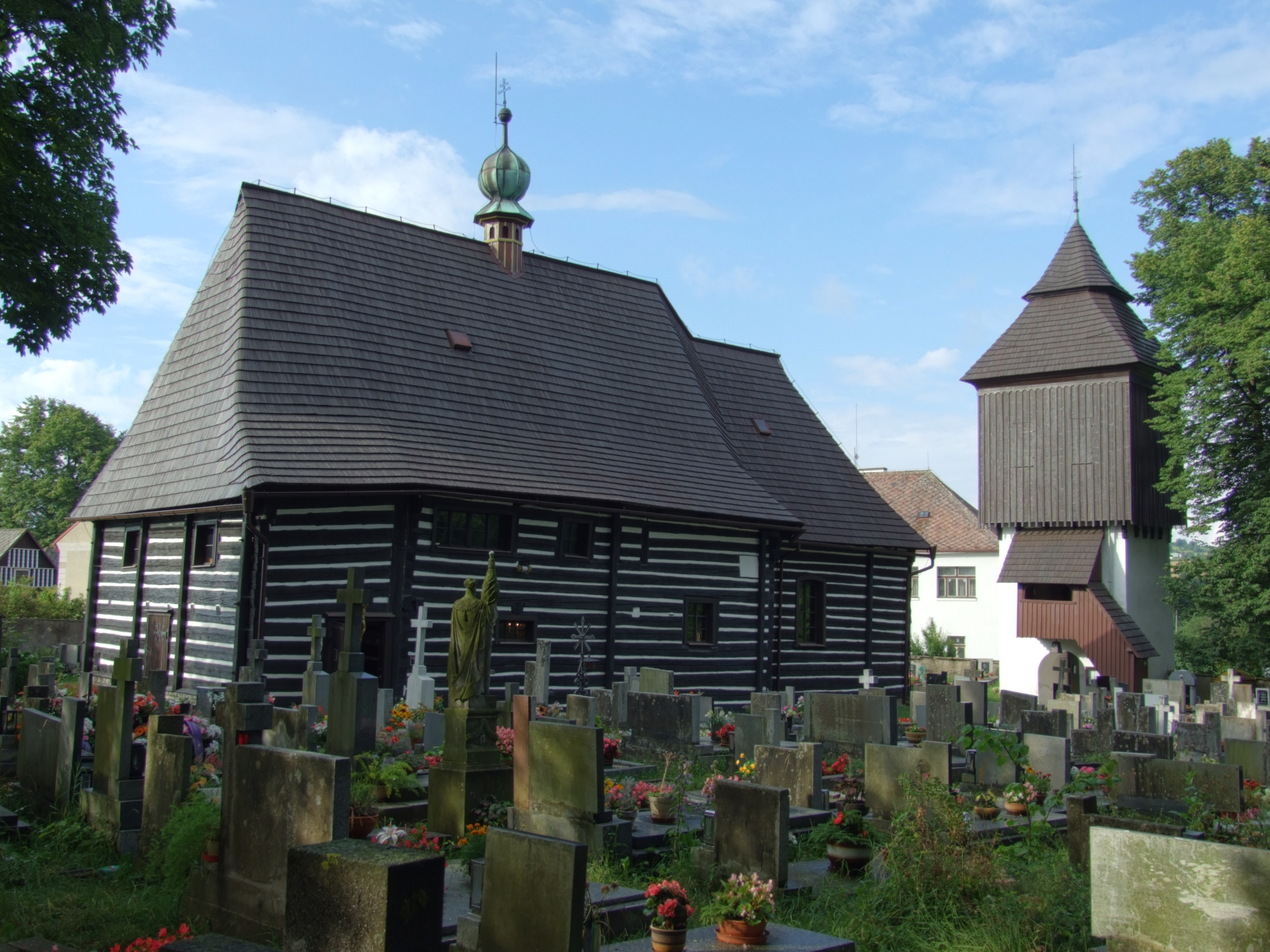
- Church of Saint John the Baptist

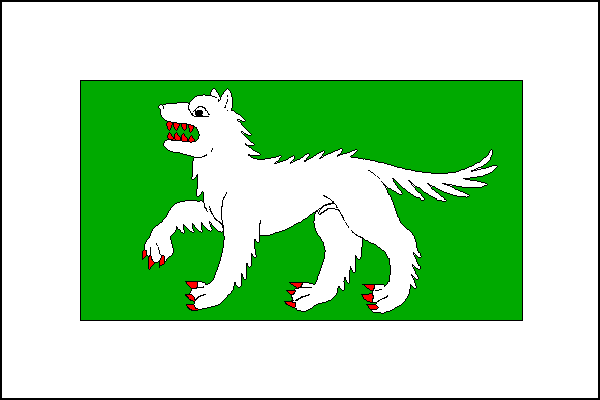
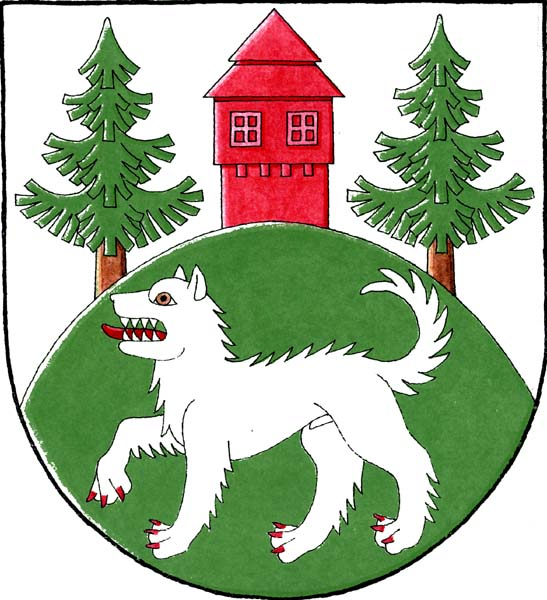
- Flag Coat of arms

- Location in the Czech Republic
- Coordinates: 50°20′38″N 16°12′14″E
- Country: Czech Republic
- Region: Hradec Králové
- District: Náchod
- First mentioned: 1369

Area
  - Total: 3.93 km^{2} (1.52 sq mi)
- Elevation: 424 m (1,391 ft)

Population (2026-01-01)
  - Total: 318
  - Density: 80.9/km^{2} (210/sq mi)
- Time zone: UTC+1 (CET)
  - Summer (DST): UTC+2 (CEST)
- Postal code: 549 01
- Website: www.slavonov.cz

Slavoňov is a municipality and village in Náchod District in the Hradec Králové Region of the Czech Republic. It has about 300 inhabitants.

== Administrative division ==
Slavoňov consists of two municipal parts (in brackets population according to the 2021 census):

- Slavoňov (244)
- Blažkov (58)

== Demographics ==
Historical population
Year	Pop.	±%
1869	463	—
1880	452	−2.4%
1890	441	−2.4%
1900	397	−10.0%
1910	403	+1.5%
1921	356	−11.7%
1930	346	−2.8%
1950	277	−19.9%
1961	245	−11.6%
1970	230	−6.1%
1980	247	+7.4%
1991	262	+6.1%
2001	262	+0.0%
2011	292	+11.5%
2021	302	+3.4%
Source: Censuses
