= Zaloňov =

- Municipality
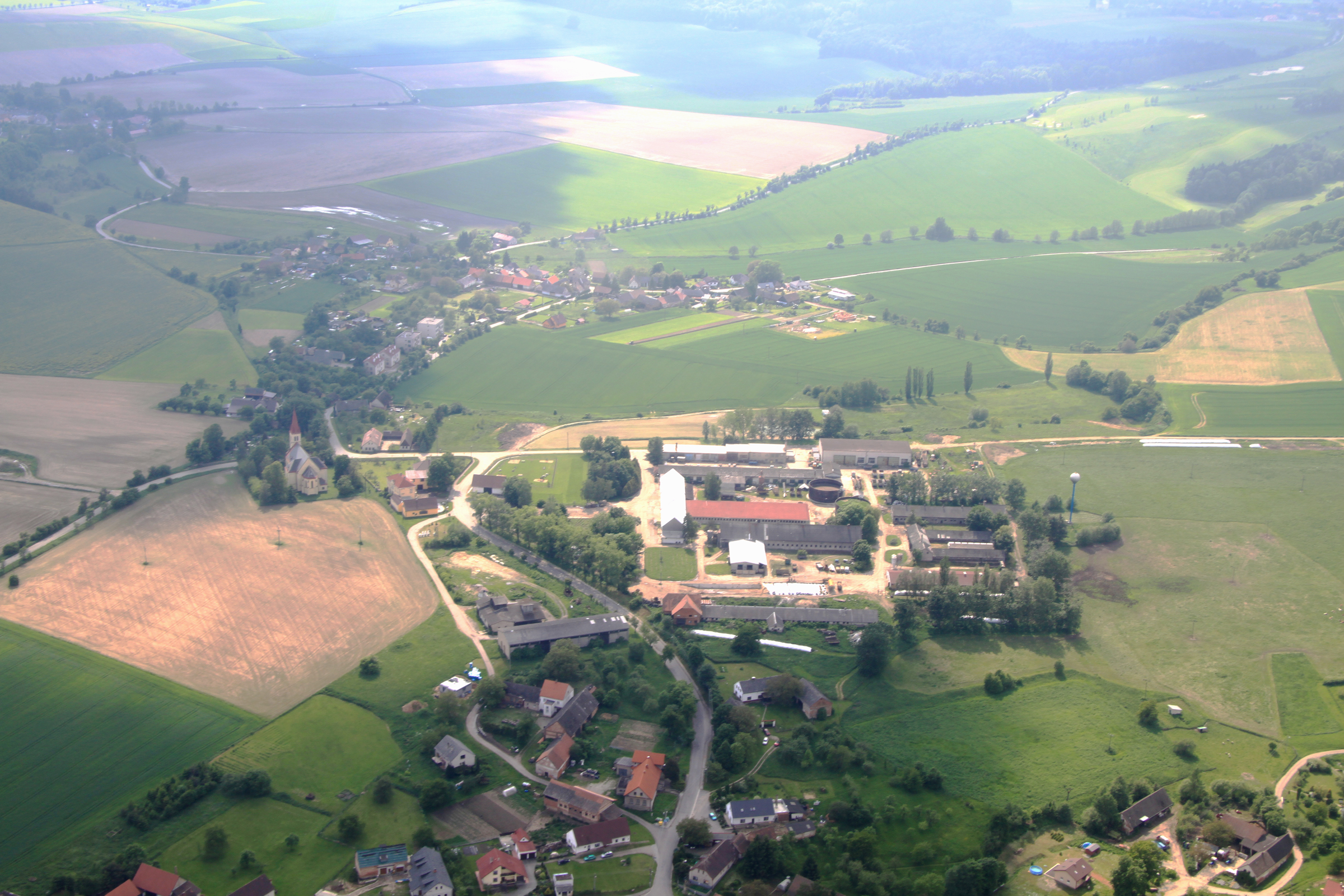
- Aerial view

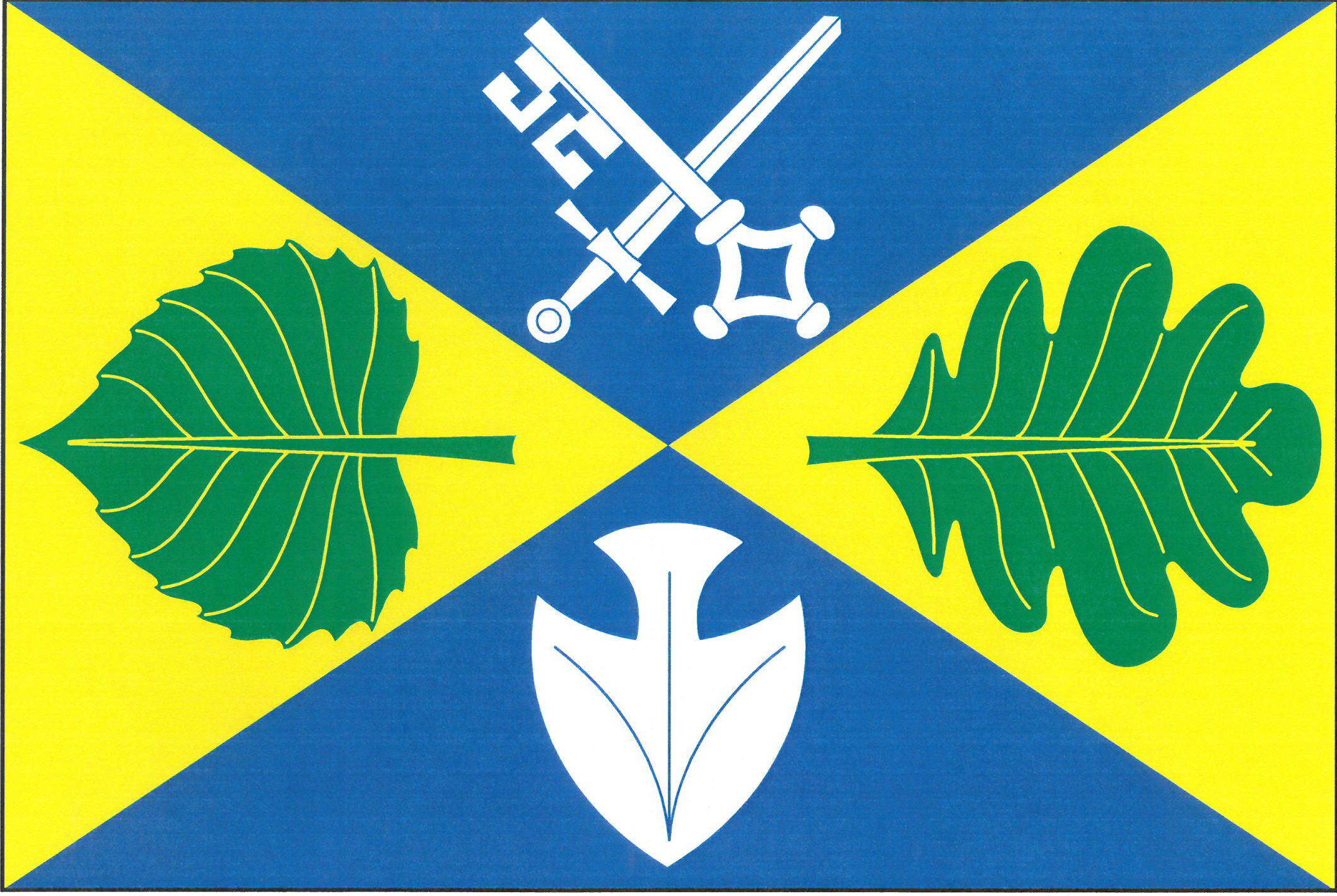
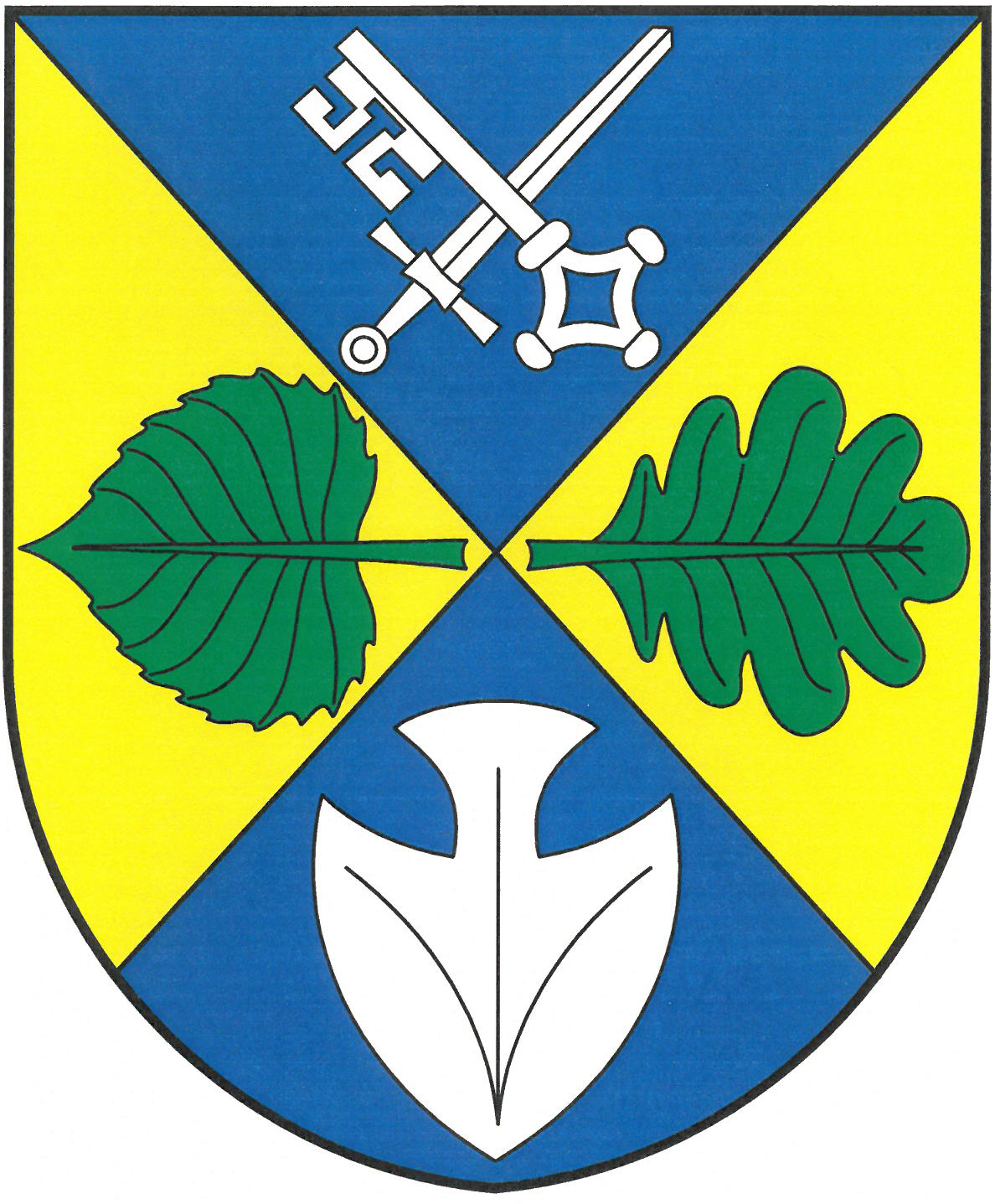
- Flag Coat of arms

- Location in the Czech Republic
- Coordinates: 50°22′26″N 15°53′17″E
- Country: Czech Republic
- Region: Hradec Králové
- District: Náchod
- First mentioned: 1361

Area
  - Total: 9.32 km^{2} (3.60 sq mi)
- Elevation: 248 m (814 ft)

Population (2026-01-01)
  - Total: 447
  - Density: 48.0/km^{2} (124/sq mi)
- Time zone: UTC+1 (CET)
  - Summer (DST): UTC+2 (CEST)
- Postal code: 551 01
- Website: www.zalonov.cz

Zaloňov is a municipality and village in Náchod District in the Hradec Králové Region of the Czech Republic. It has about 400 inhabitants.

== Administrative division ==
Zaloňov consists of four municipal parts (in brackets population according to the 2021 census):

- Zaloňov (138)
- Horní Dolce (29)
- Rtyně (110)
- Vestec (164)

== Demographics ==
Historical population
Year	Pop.	±%
1869	764	—
1880	802	+5.0%
1890	812	+1.2%
1900	708	−12.8%
1910	654	−7.6%
1921	637	−2.6%
1930	597	−6.3%
1950	459	−23.1%
1961	434	−5.4%
1970	386	−11.1%
1980	404	+4.7%
1991	363	−10.1%
2001	409	+12.7%
2011	432	+5.6%
2021	441	+2.1%
Source: Censuses
