= Rožnov (Náchod District) =

- Municipality
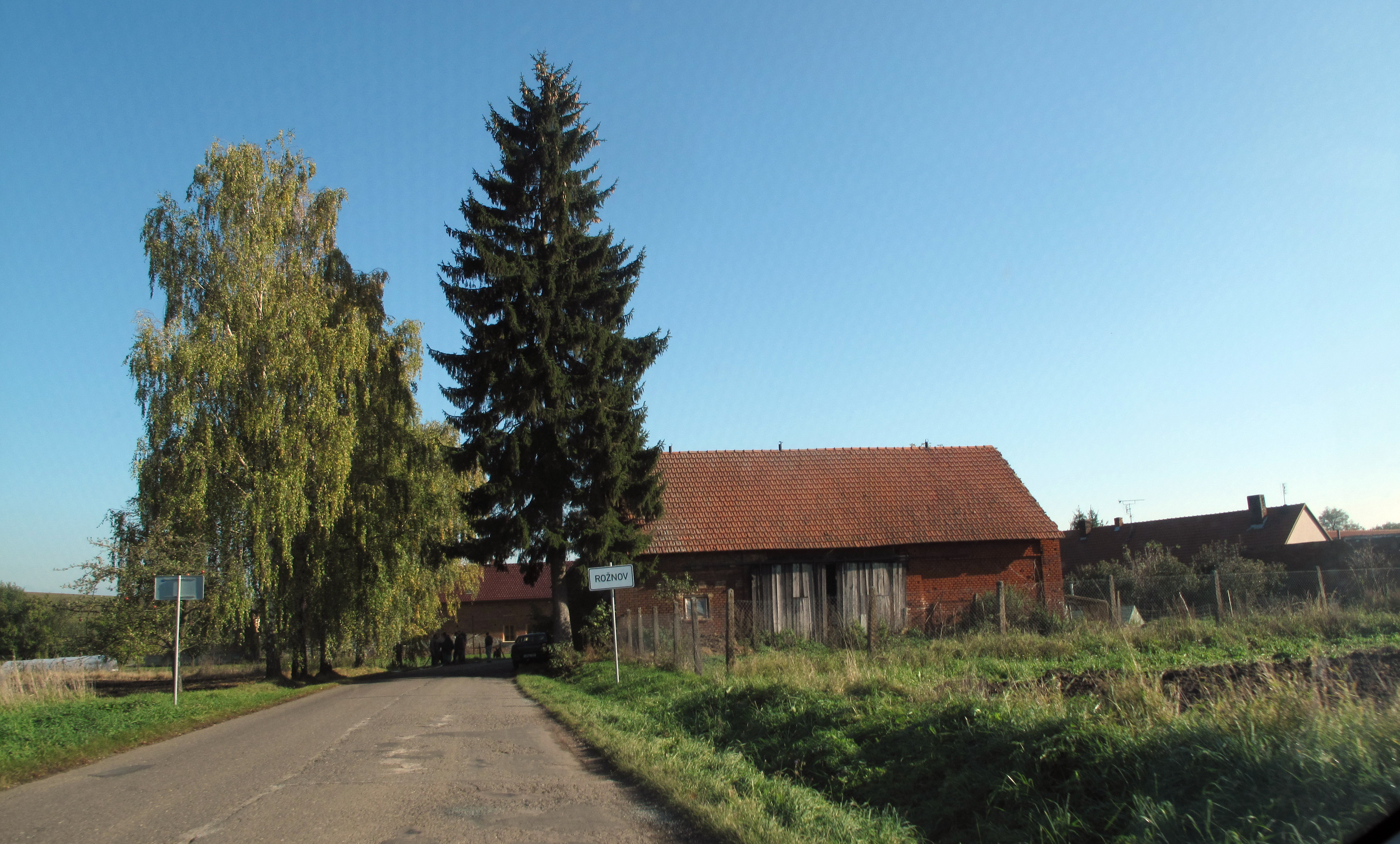
- Road heading to the village

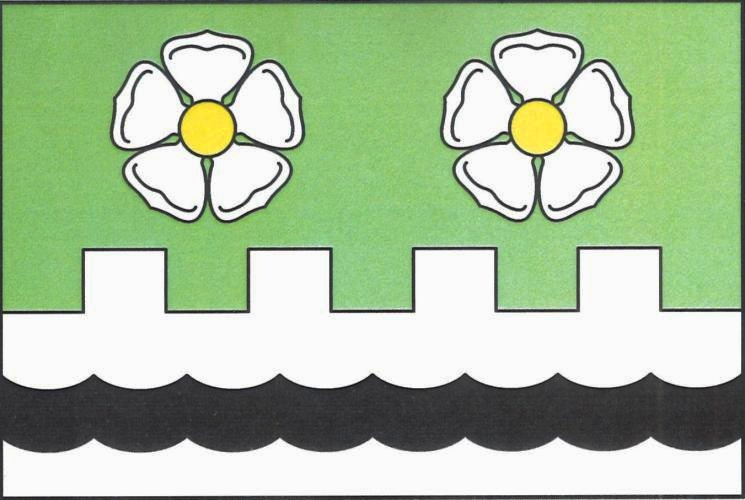
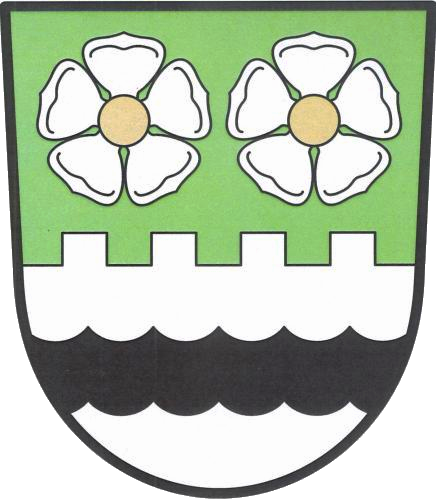
- Flag Coat of arms

- Location in the Czech Republic
- Coordinates: 50°20′17″N 15°51′41″E
- Country: Czech Republic
- Region: Hradec Králové
- District: Náchod
- First mentioned: 1387

Area
  - Total: 5.42 km^{2} (2.09 sq mi)
- Elevation: 261 m (856 ft)

Population (2026-01-01)
  - Total: 382
  - Density: 70.5/km^{2} (183/sq mi)
- Time zone: UTC+1 (CET)
  - Summer (DST): UTC+2 (CEST)
- Postal code: 551 01
- Website: www.obecroznov.cz

Rožnov is a municipality and village in Náchod District in the Hradec Králové Region of the Czech Republic. It has about 400 inhabitants.

== Administrative division ==
Rožnov consists of two municipal parts (in brackets population according to the 2021 census):

- Rožnov (193)
- Neznášov (172)

== History ==
The first written mention of Rožnov is from 1387. Neznášov was first mentioned in 1371.

== Demographics ==
Historical population
Year	Pop.	±%
1869	612	—
1880	648	+5.9%
1890	651	+0.5%
1900	611	−6.1%
1910	564	−7.7%
1921	566	+0.4%
1930	599	+5.8%
1950	462	−22.9%
1961	483	+4.5%
1970	470	−2.7%
1980	395	−16.0%
1991	378	−4.3%
2001	370	−2.1%
2011	376	+1.6%
2021	365	−2.9%
Source: Censuses
