= Černčice (Náchod District) =

- Municipality
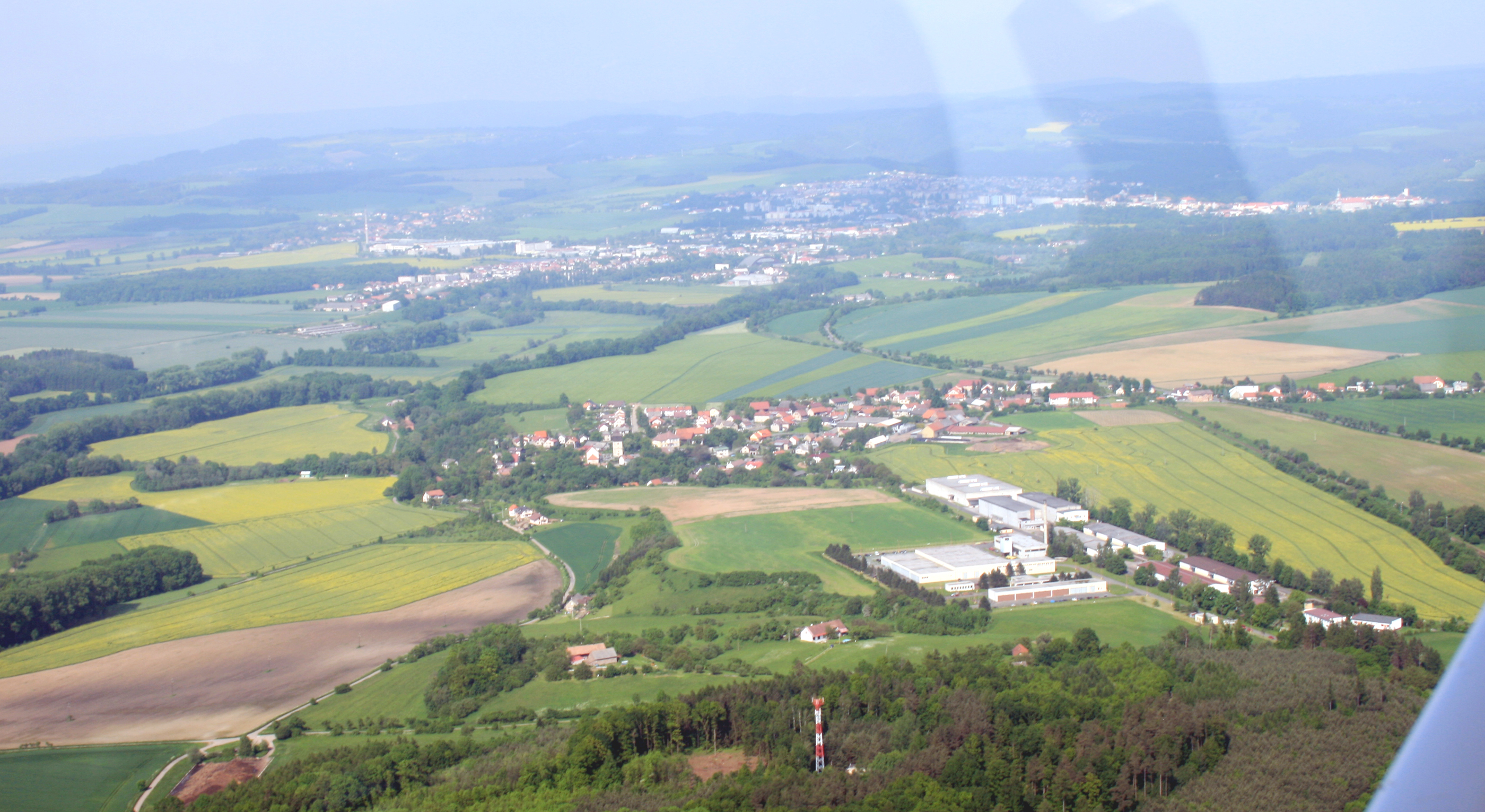
- Aerial view

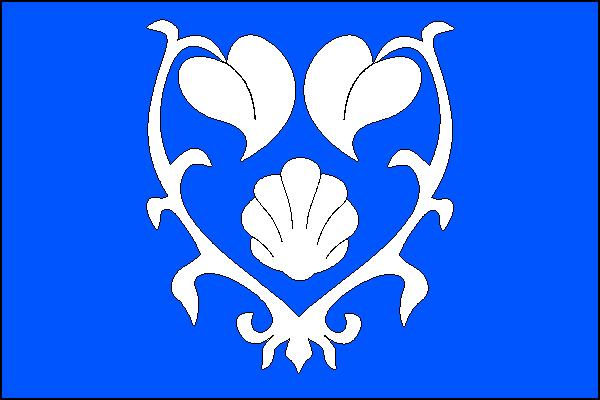
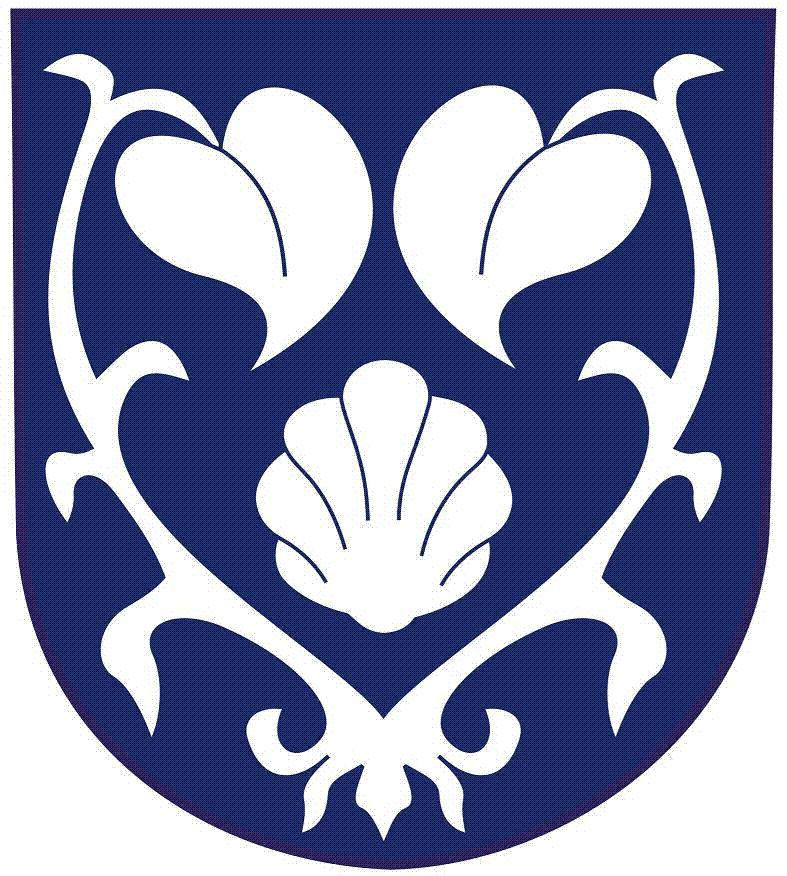
- Flag Coat of arms

- Location in the Czech Republic
- Coordinates: 50°20′9″N 16°6′10″E
- Country: Czech Republic
- Region: Hradec Králové
- District: Náchod
- First mentioned: 1318

Area
  - Total: 5.65 km^{2} (2.18 sq mi)
- Elevation: 297 m (974 ft)

Population (2026-01-01)
  - Total: 471
  - Density: 83.4/km^{2} (216/sq mi)
- Time zone: UTC+1 (CET)
  - Summer (DST): UTC+2 (CEST)
- Postal code: 549 01
- Website: www.cerncice.eu

Černčice is a municipality and village in Náchod District in the Hradec Králové Region of the Czech Republic. It has about 500 inhabitants.

== Demographics ==
Historical population
| Year | Pop. | ±% |
|---|---|---|
| 1869 | 527 | — |
| 1880 | 578 | +9.7% |
| 1890 | 557 | −3.6% |
| 1900 | 532 | −4.5% |
| 1910 | 637 | +19.7% |
| 1921 | 636 | −0.2% |
| 1930 | 595 | −6.4% |
| 1950 | 442 | −25.7% |
| 1961 | 443 | +0.2% |
| 1970 | 429 | −3.2% |
| 1980 | 411 | −4.2% |
| 1991 | 445 | +8.3% |
| 2001 | 452 | +1.6% |
| 2011 | 450 | −0.4% |
| 2021 | 445 | −1.1% |
Source: Censuses
