= Ścinawka =

Ścinawka Stěnava
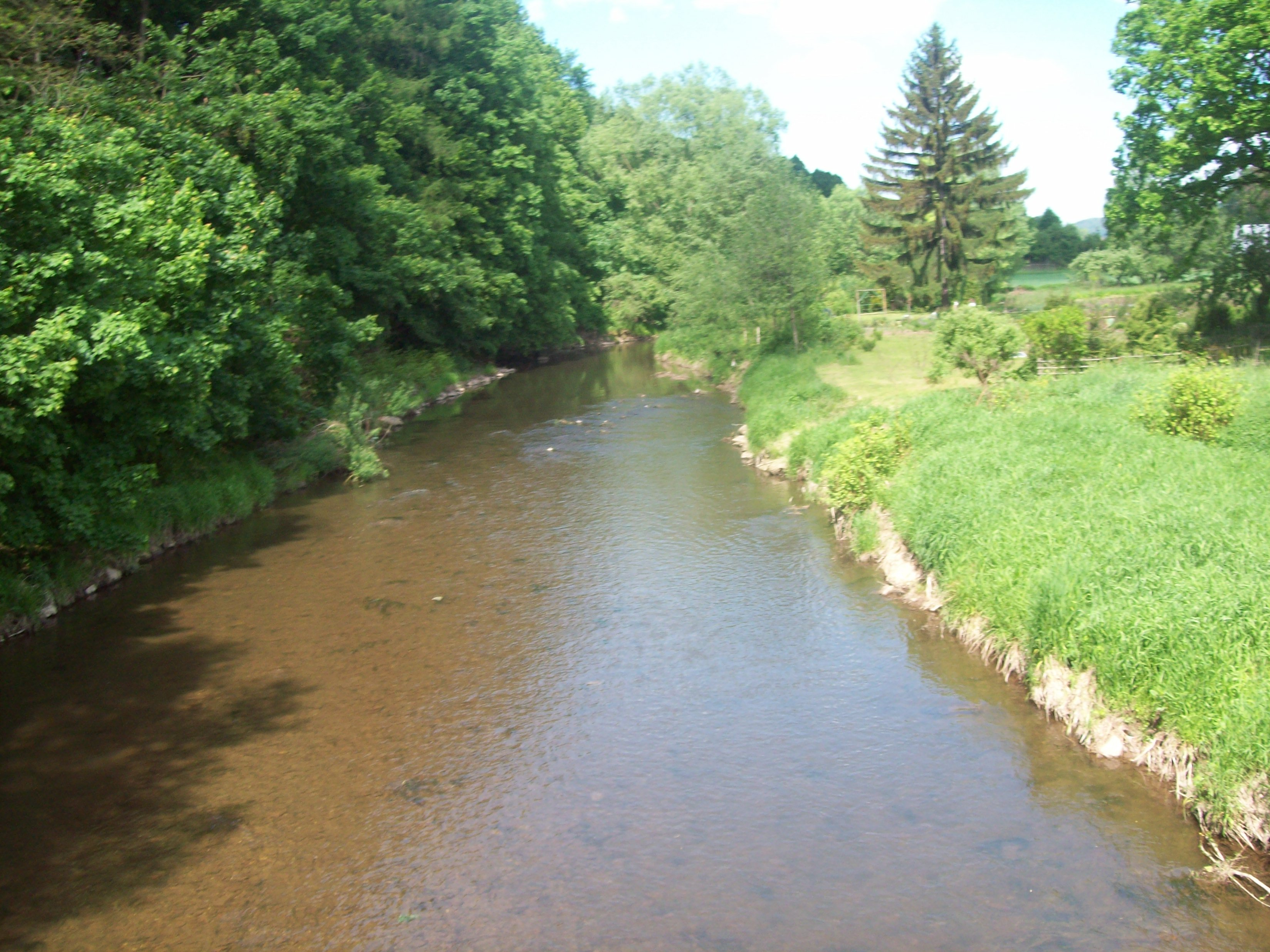
- The Ścinawka in Ścinawka Średnia

Location
- Countries: Poland; Czech Republic
- Voivodeships/ Regions: Lower Silesian; Hradec Králové

Physical characteristics
- Source
  - location: Jedlina-Zdrój, Wałbrzych Mountains
  - coordinates: 50°43′11″N 16°17′50″E
  - elevation: 720 m (2,360 ft)
- Mouth
  - location: Eastern Neisse
  - coordinates: 50°28′13″N 16°39′18″E
  - elevation: 279 m (915 ft)
- Length: 62 km (39 mi)
- Basin size: 594 km^{2} (229 sq mi)
- Discharge
  - average: 4.69 m^{3}/s (166 cu ft/s) near estuary

Basin features
- Progression: Eastern Neisse→ Oder→ Baltic Sea

The Ścinawka (Czech: Stěnava) is a river in Poland and the Czech Republic, a left tributary of the Eastern Neisse. It flows through the Lower Silesian Voivodeship in Poland and through the Hradec Králové Region in the Czech Republic. It is 62 km (39 mi) long.

== Etymology ==
The name was probably derived from the Germanic words steina-ahwa, meaning 'stony river'. The name was first recorded in 1213 as Stenawa.

== Characteristic ==
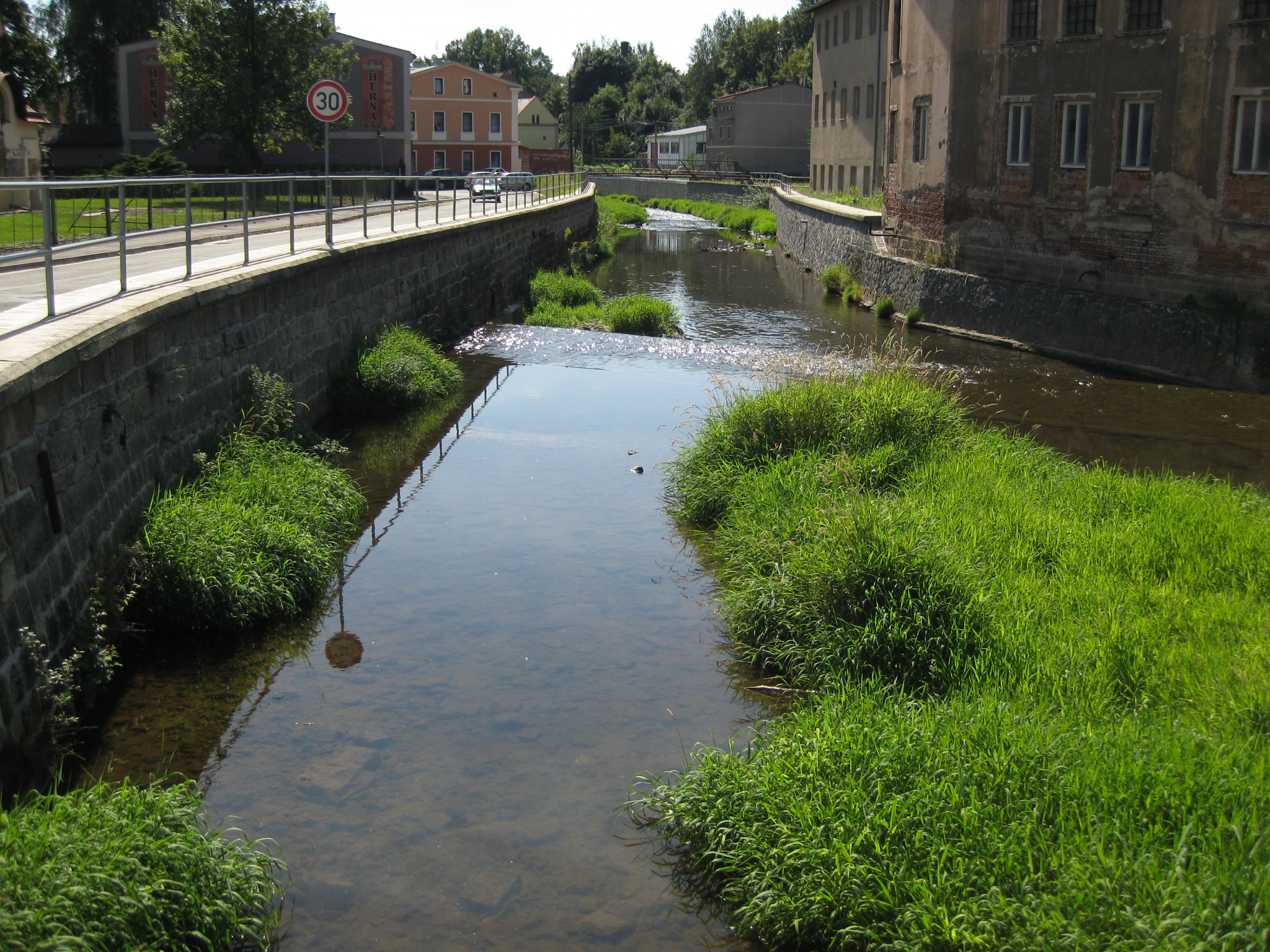
The Ścinawka in Broumov

The Ścinawka originates in the territory of Jedlina-Zdrój in the Wałbrzych Mountains at an elevation of 720 m (2,360 ft) and flows to Ławica, where it merges with the Eastern Neisse River at an elevation of 279 m (915 ft). It is 62 km (39 mi) long, of which 20.5 km (12.7 mi) is in the Czech Republic. Its drainage basin has an area of 594 km^{2} (229 sq mi), of which 234.8 km^{2} (90.7 sq mi) is in the Czech Republic.

The average discharge at the mouth is 4.69 m^{3}/s (166 cu ft/s). The average discharge at the Czech–Polish state border, before the river returns to Poland, is 1.91 m^{3}/s (67 cu ft/s).

The most important tributaries join the river in Poland. The longest tributaries of the Ścinawka are:

Tributary	Length (km)	Side
Włodzica	20.6	left
Posna	13.7	right
Czerwionek	13.5	left
Dzik	11.1	left
Černý potok	9.3	left
Heřmánkovický potok	7.6	left

== Course ==
The river flows through the territories of Jedlina-Zdrój and the Gmina Mieroszów in Poland, through Vernéřovice, Meziměstí, Jetřichov, Hynčice, Hejtmánkovice, Heřmánkovice, Broumov, Křinice, Martínkovice and Otovice in the Czech Republic and then through the territories of the gminas of Radków and Kłodzko in Poland.

== Nature ==
The upper course of the river crosses the Sudety Wałbrzyskie Landscape Park. The entire flow of the river in the Czech Republic is located within the Broumovsko Protected Landscape Area.

== See also ==
- List of rivers of the Czech Republic
- List of rivers of Poland
