= Meziměstí =

- Town
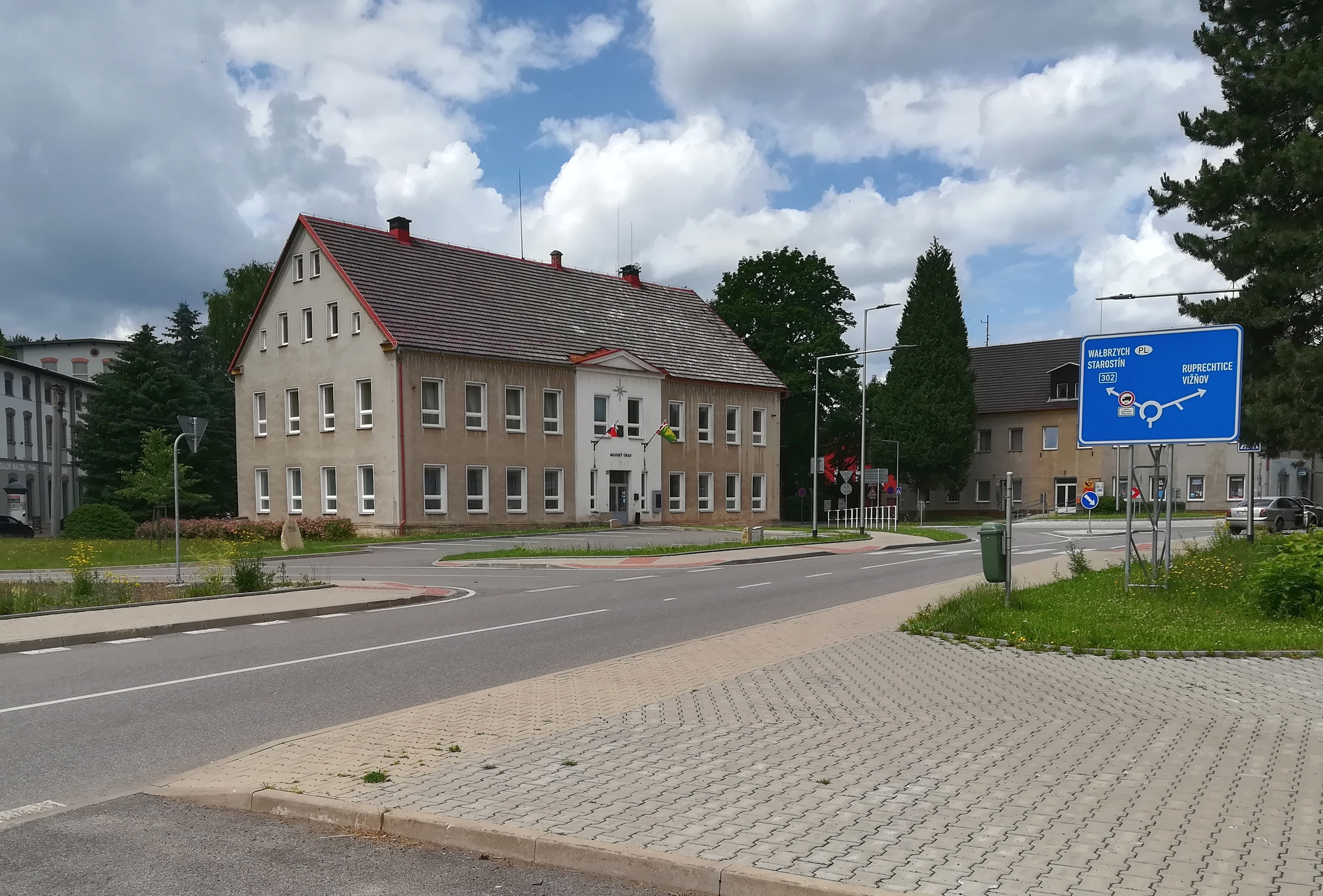
- Town centre with the town hall

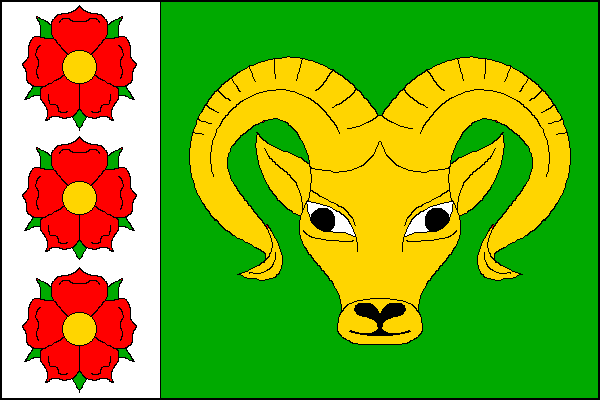
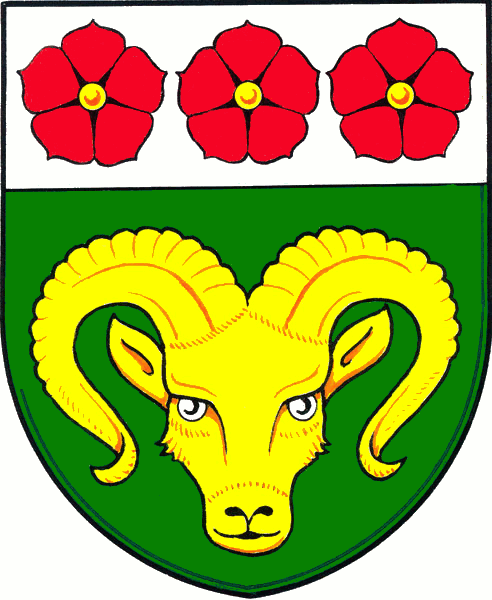
- Flag Coat of arms

- Location in the Czech Republic
- Coordinates: 50°37′29″N 16°14′32″E
- Country: Czech Republic
- Region: Hradec Králové
- District: Náchod
- First mentioned: 1408

Government
  - Mayor: Pavlína Jarešová

Area
  - Total: 25.71 km^{2} (9.93 sq mi)
- Elevation: 432 m (1,417 ft)

Population (2026-01-01)
  - Total: 2,283
  - Density: 88.80/km^{2} (230.0/sq mi)
- Time zone: UTC+1 (CET)
  - Summer (DST): UTC+2 (CEST)
- Postal code: 549 81
- Website: www.mezimesti.cz

Meziměstí (Czech pronunciation: [ˈmɛzɪˈmɲɛsciː]; German: Halbstadt) is a town in Náchod District in the Hradec Králové Region of the Czech Republic. It has about 2,300 inhabitants. The town is located on the Ścinawka River in the Broumov Highlands, near the border with Poland.

Meziměstí became a town in 1992. The villages of Vižňov and Ruprechtice within the town's area are known for the Church of Saint Anne and the Church of Saint James the Great, which are both protected as national cultural monuments.

== Administrative division ==
Meziměstí consists of six municipal parts (in brackets population according to the 2021 census):

- Meziměstí (1,546)
- Březová (105)
- Pomeznice (5)
- Ruprechtice (266)
- Starostín (75)
- Vižňov (234)

Březová forms an exclave of the municipal territory.

== Etymology ==
The initial Czech name of Meziměstí was Dolní Vižňov ('lower Vižňov') and was probably derived from the Middle High German wisen-ouwe, meaning 'meadow floodplain'. The German name of the settlement was Halbstadt, meaning 'half of a town'. The modern Czech name Meziměstí means '[an area] between the towns'.

== Geography ==
Meziměstí is located about 23 kilometres (14 mi) northeast of Náchod and 16 km (10 mi) south of the Polish city of Wałbrzych. It borders Poland in the west and north. It lies in the Broumov Highlands, in the Broumovsko Protected Landscape Area. The highest point of Meziměstí and one of the two highest mountains of the whole Broumov Highlands is the Ruprechtický Špičák mountain at 881 m (2,890 ft) above sea level. The Ścinawka River flows through the town.

== History ==
The first written mention of Meziměstí is from 1408, under the name Dolní Vižňov. From 1434, it was called by its German name Halbstadt. In 1499, it became a property of Benedictine monastery in Broumov. The abbots of the monastery set up a summer residence here.

In the late 19th century, Meziměstí was industrialised. In 1918, it received its Czech name.

During the German occupation of Czechoslovakia in 1944–1945, the German administration operated a subcamp of the Gross-Rosen concentration camp, whose prisoners were Jewish women from Poland and Hungary, transported from the Auschwitz concentration camp.

After World War II, the German-speaking population was expelled and replaced by Czech settlers. During the 1960s and 1970s, intensive housing construction took place here. In 1992, Meziměstí received the town status.

== Demographics ==
Historical population

Year	Pop.	±%
1869	3,122	—
1880	3,640	+16.6%
1890	3,697	+1.6%
1900	3,900	+5.5%
1910	3,887	−0.3%

Year	Pop.	±%
1921	3,773	−2.9%
1930	3,967	+5.1%
1950	2,544	−35.9%
1961	2,632	+3.5%
1970	2,680	+1.8%

Year	Pop.	±%
1980	2,759	+2.9%
1991	3,009	+9.1%
2001	2,852	−5.2%
2011	2,517	−11.7%
2021	2,231	−11.4%

Source: Censuses

== Transport ==
There are six border crossings with Poland in the municipal territory. In addition to four pedestrian crossings, there is the road crossing Starostín / Golińsk and the railway crossing Meziměstí / Mieroszów.

Meziměstí is located on the railway line Broumov–Starkoč.

== Sights ==
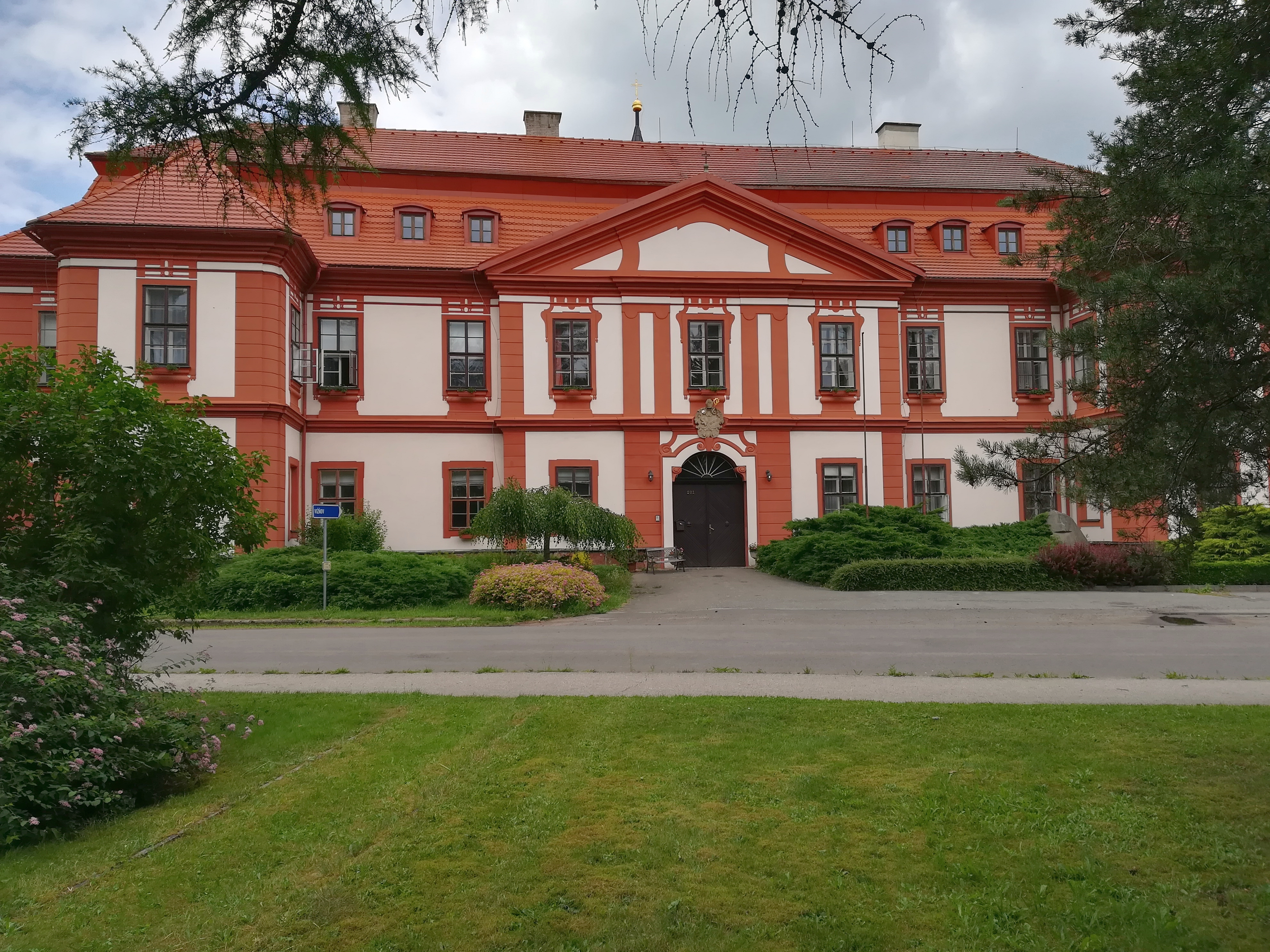
Meziměstí Castle

A valuable Baroque building is the Meziměstí Castle. It was built according to the plans of the architect Kilian Ignaz Dientzenhofer in 1750. Today the building is privately owned.

The Church of Saint Anne in Vižňov, designed by K. I. Dientzenhofer, was built in 1724–1727. The Church of Saint James the Great in Ruprechtice was built in 1720–1723 according to the design by architect Christoph Dientzenhofer. Both these Baroque churches are very valuable and are protected as national cultural monuments.
