= Vernéřovice =

- Municipality
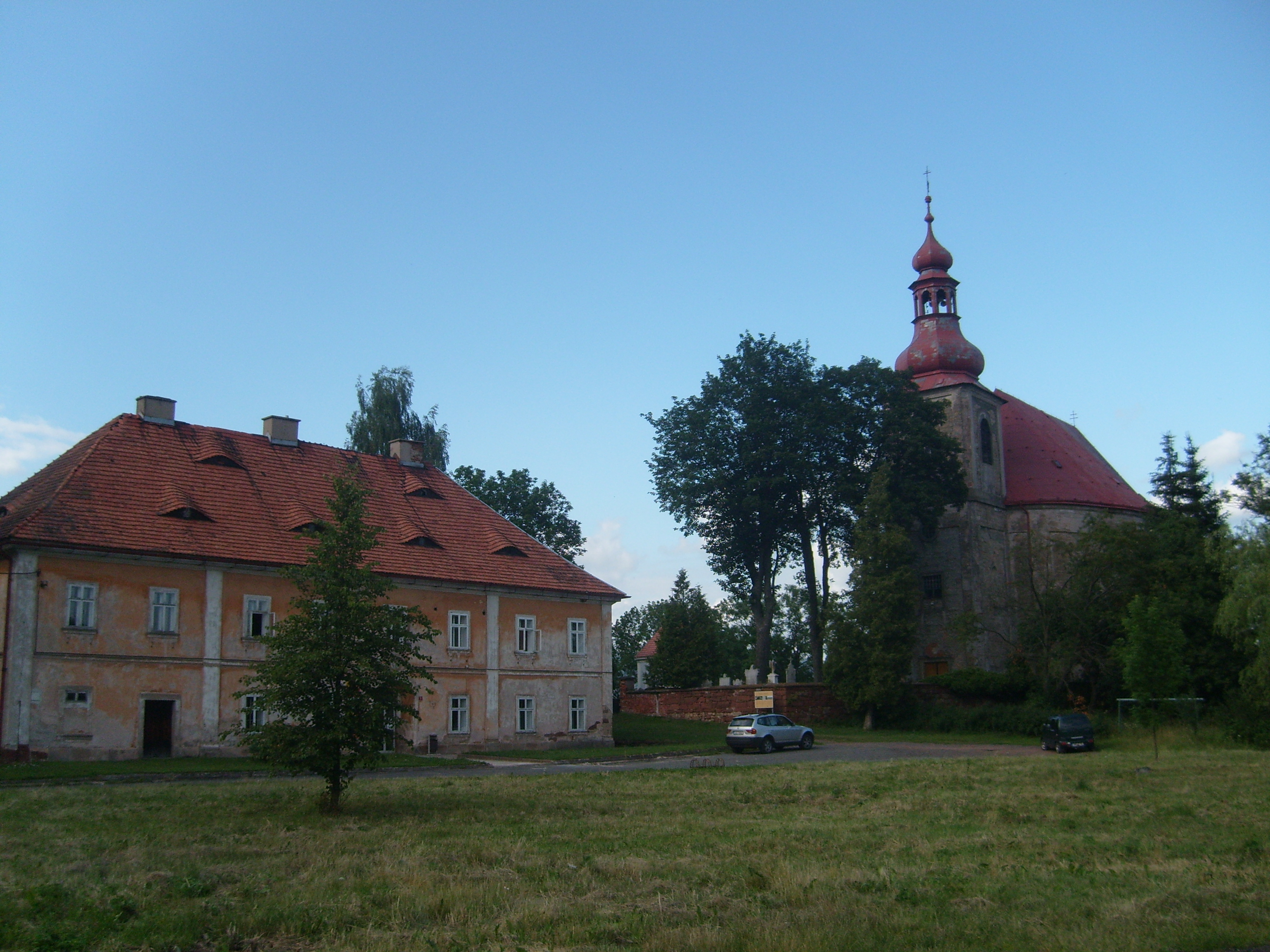
- Church of Saint Michael the Archangel and rectory

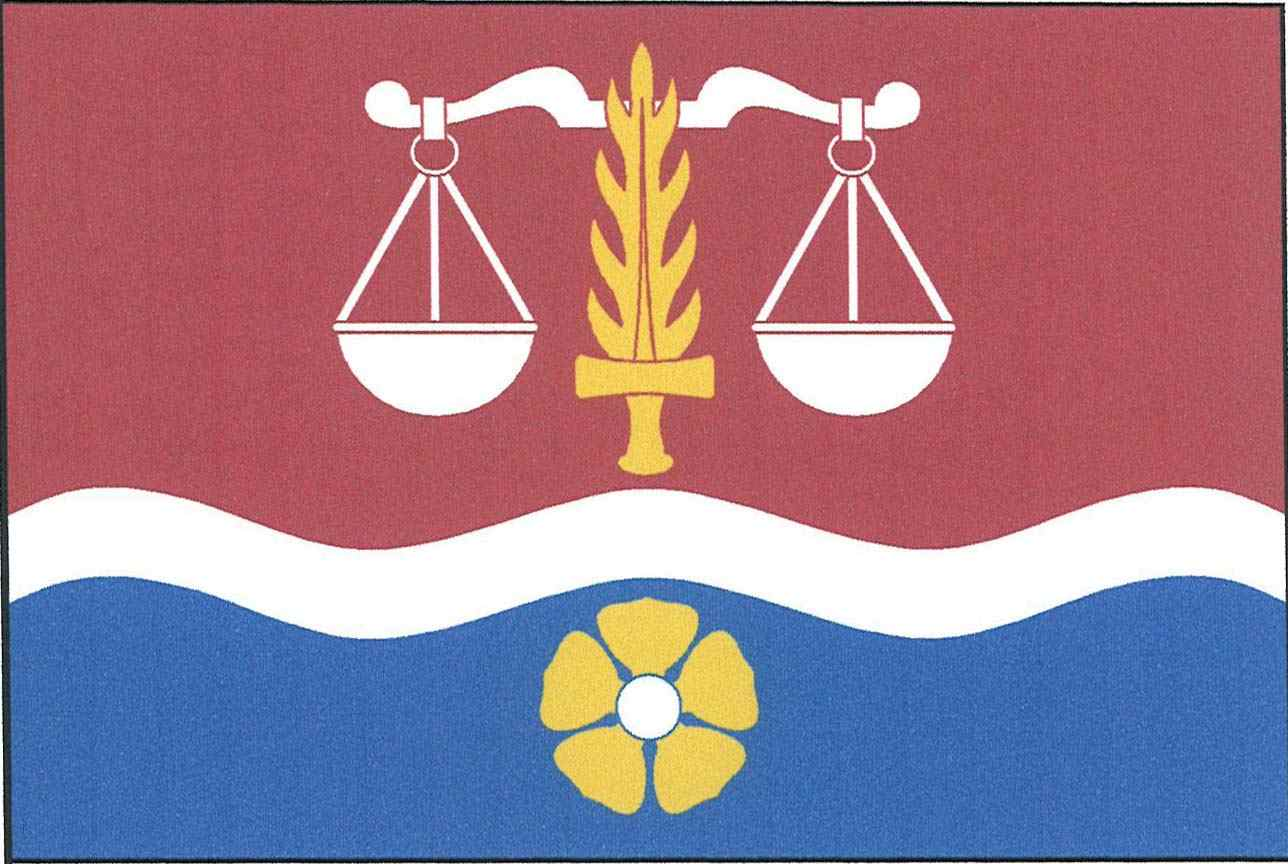
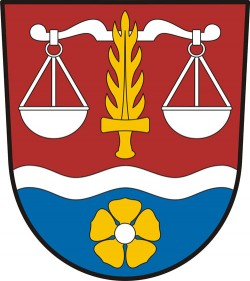
- Flag Coat of arms

- Location in the Czech Republic
- Coordinates: 50°28′6″N 16°13′39″E
- Country: Czech Republic
- Region: Hradec Králové
- District: Náchod
- First mentioned: 1351

Area
  - Total: 9.41 km^{2} (3.63 sq mi)
- Elevation: 453 m (1,486 ft)

Population (2026-01-01)
  - Total: 318
  - Density: 33.8/km^{2} (87.5/sq mi)
- Time zone: UTC+1 (CET)
  - Summer (DST): UTC+2 (CEST)
- Postal code: 549 82
- Website: www.vernerovice.cz

Vernéřovice (German: Deutsch Wernersdorf) is a municipality and village in Náchod District in the Hradec Králové Region of the Czech Republic. It has about 300 inhabitants. It is known for the Church of Saint Michael the Archangel, protected as a national cultural monument.

== Etymology ==
The initial name of the village was Vernířovice and later was distorted to Vernéřovice. The name was derived from the personal name Verníř (with origins in the German name Werner).

== Geography ==
Vernéřovice is located about 22 kilometres (14 mi) north of Náchod and 51 km (32 mi) northeast of Hradec Králové. It borders Poland in the north. It lies in the Broumov Highlands, in the Broumovsko Protected Landscape Area. The highest point is below the summit of the mountain Buková hora at 635 m (2,083 ft) above sea level. The village is situated along the stream Vernéřovický potok, which originates here. The Ścinawka River flows along the northeastern municipal border.

== History ==
The first written mention of Vernéřovice is from 1351, when it was known as Wernhirsdorf. The village was founded in the second half of the 13th century.

== Demographics ==
Historical population

Year	Pop.	±%
1869	1,268	—
1880	1,207	−4.8%
1890	1,199	−0.7%
1900	1,349	+12.5%
1910	1,392	+3.2%

Year	Pop.	±%
1921	1,200	−13.8%
1930	1,081	−9.9%
1950	551	−49.0%
1961	532	−3.4%
1970	454	−14.7%

Year	Pop.	±%
1980	445	−2.0%
1991	377	−15.3%
2001	372	−1.3%
2011	325	−12.6%
2021	303	−6.8%

Source: Censuses

== Transport ==
There are no railways or major roads passing through the municipality.

== Sights ==
The main landmark of Vernéřovice is the Church of Saint Michael the Archangel. It was built in the Baroque style in 1719–1723 according to the design by architect Christoph Dientzenhofer. For its value it has been protected as a national cultural monument since 2022.

The pseudo-Gothic Church of Our Lady of Help was built in 1904. It is a pilgrimage site.
