= Martínkovice =

- Municipality
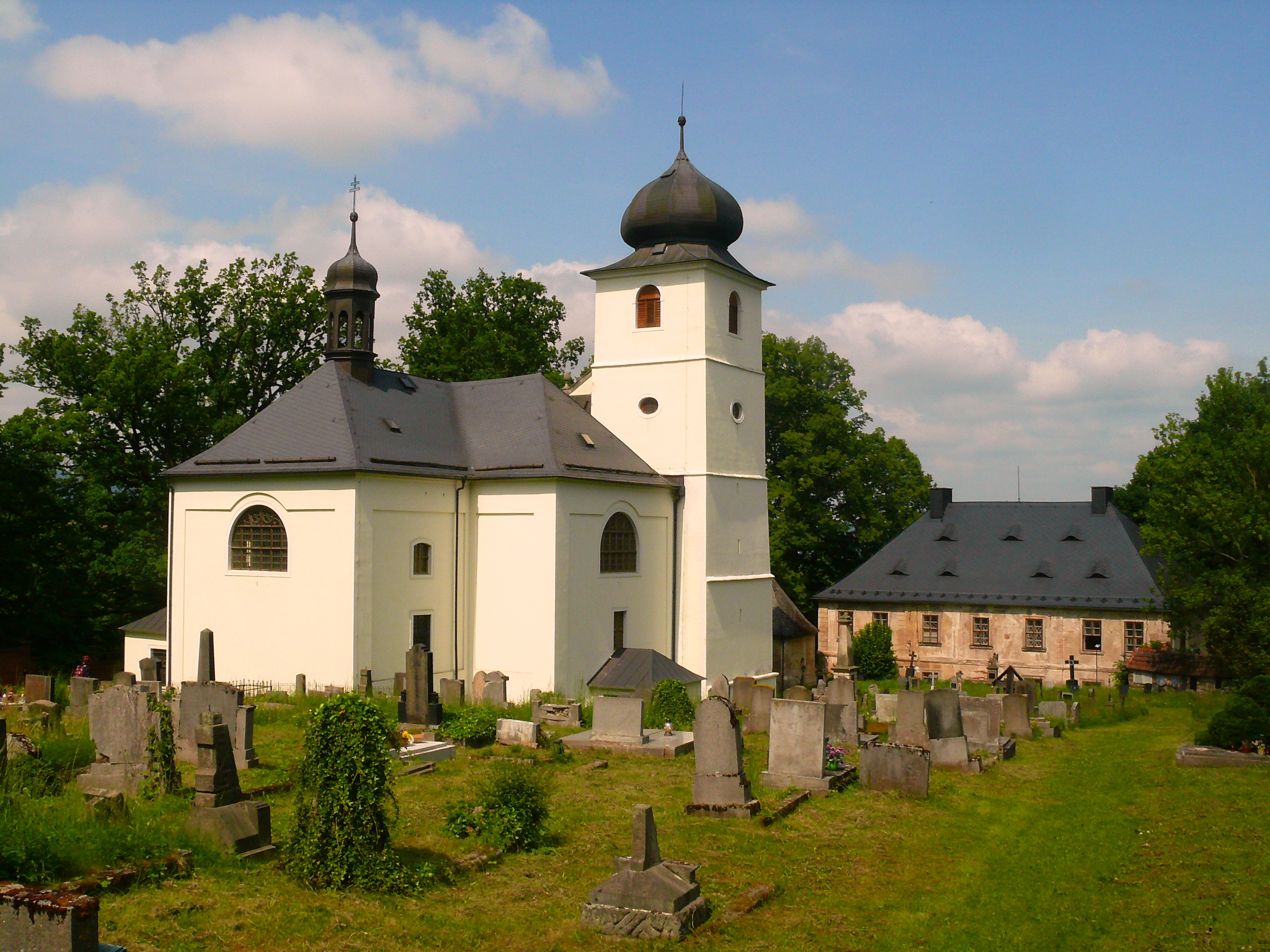
- Church of Saints George and Martin

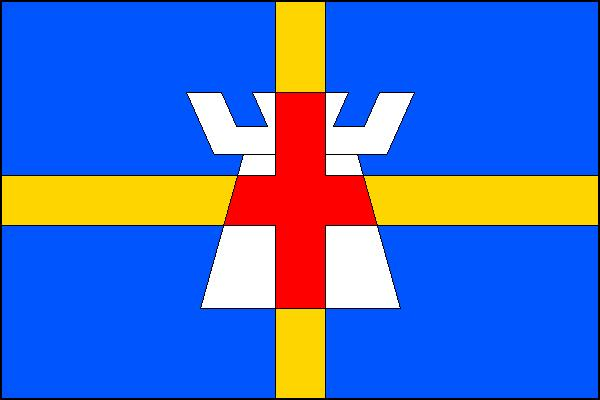
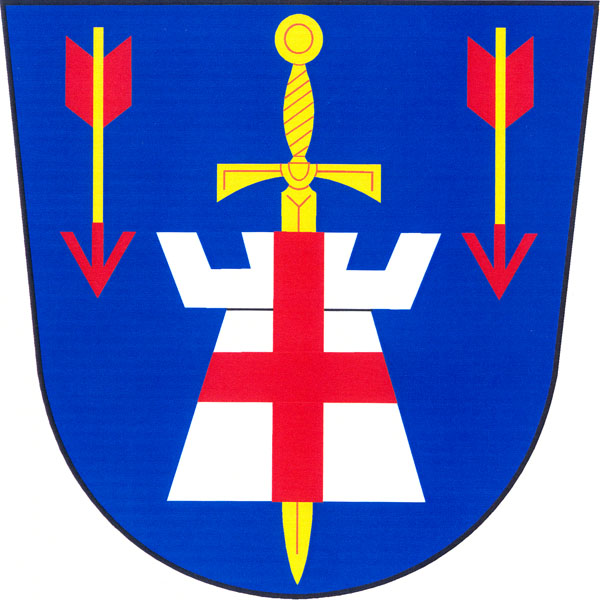
- Flag Coat of arms

- Location in the Czech Republic
- Coordinates: 50°32′51″N 16°20′31″E
- Country: Czech Republic
- Region: Hradec Králové
- District: Náchod
- Founded: 1255

Area
  - Total: 14.13 km^{2} (5.46 sq mi)
- Elevation: 390 m (1,280 ft)

Population (2026-01-01)
  - Total: 510
  - Density: 36/km^{2} (93/sq mi)
- Time zone: UTC+1 (CET)
  - Summer (DST): UTC+2 (CEST)
- Postal code: 549 73
- Website: www.martinkovice.cz

Martínkovice (German: Märzdorf) is a municipality and village in Náchod District in the Hradec Králové Region of the Czech Republic. It has about 500 inhabitants. It is known for the Church of Saints George and Martin, protected as a national cultural monument.

== Etymology ==
Martínkovice was named after its founder, abbot Martin I.

== Geography ==
Martínkovice is located about 19 kilometres (12 mi) northeast of Náchod and 24 km (15 mi) south of the Polish city of Wałbrzych. It lies in the Broumov Highlands, in the Broumovsko Protected Landscape Area. The highest point is at 725 m (2,379 ft) above sea level. The village is situated in the valley of the stream Martínkovický potok. It is a tributary of the Ścinawka River, which flows along the northern municipal border.

== History ==
Martínkovice was founded in 1255 by the abbot of the Benedictine monastery in Broumov, Martin I, and later named after him. The area around the village used to be known for sandstone quarrying.

== Demographics ==
Historical population

Year	Pop.	±%
1869	1,527	—
1880	1,456	−4.6%
1890	1,431	−1.7%
1900	1,641	+14.7%
1910	1,797	+9.5%

Year	Pop.	±%
1921	1,597	−11.1%
1930	1,628	+1.9%
1950	841	−48.3%
1961	787	−6.4%
1970	682	−13.3%

Year	Pop.	±%
1980	633	−7.2%
1991	541	−14.5%
2001	550	+1.7%
2011	509	−7.5%
2021	475	−6.7%

Source: Censuses

== Transport ==
No railways or major roads are passing through the municipality.

== Sights ==
The main landmark of Martínkovice is the Church of Saints George and Martin. It was built in the early Baroque style in 1692–1698. For its value, it has been protected as a national cultural monument since 2022. Next to the church is a Baroque building of the rectory, which is as old as the church.

In the western part of Martínkovice is the Chapel of Saint Anne. It was built in 1798. The Stations of the Cross leads to it. The second Stations of the Cross line the cemetery wall and date from the first half of the 19th century.
