= Božanov =

- Municipality
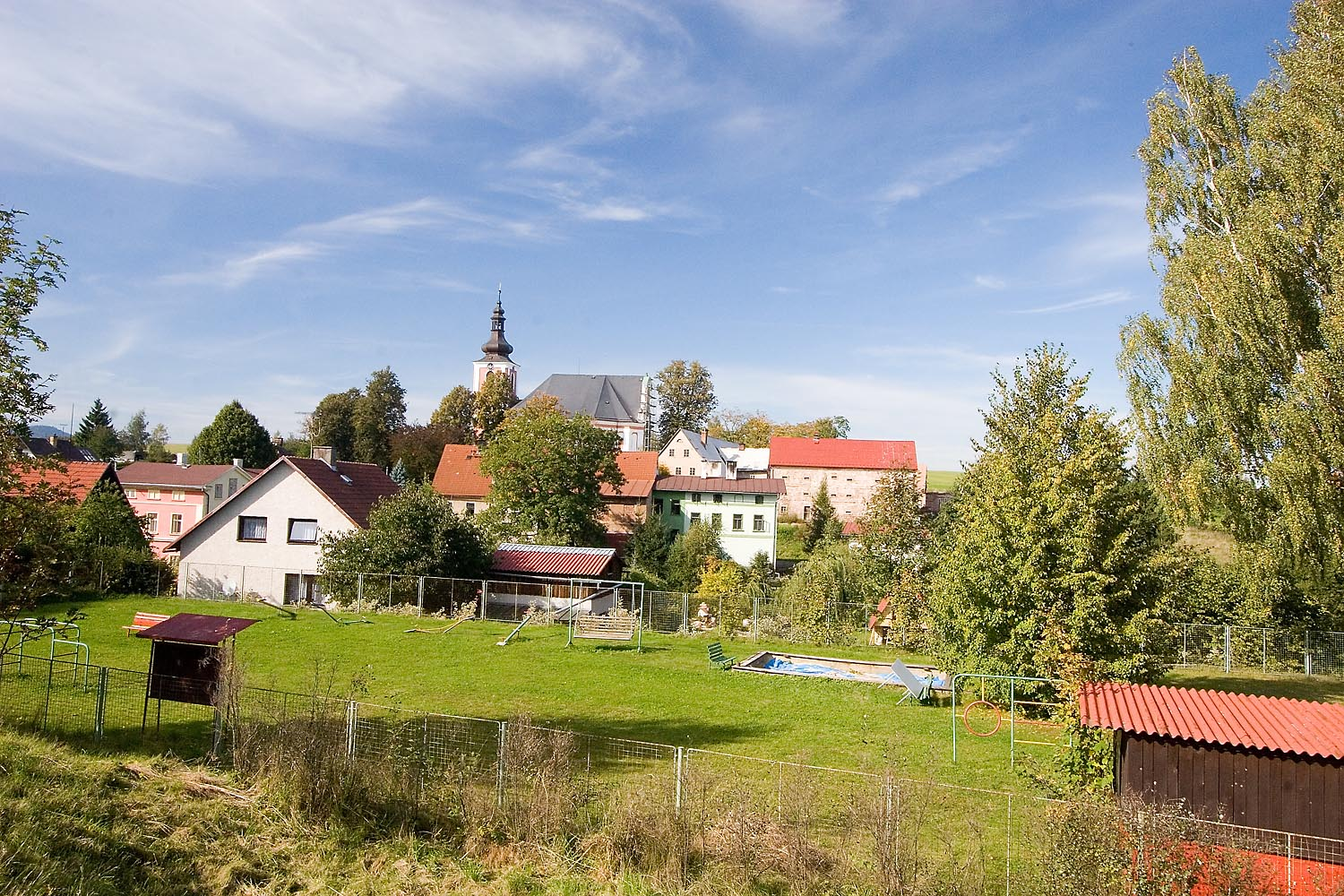
- General view

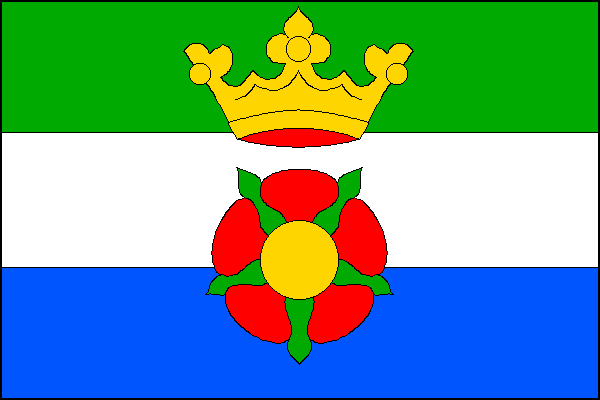
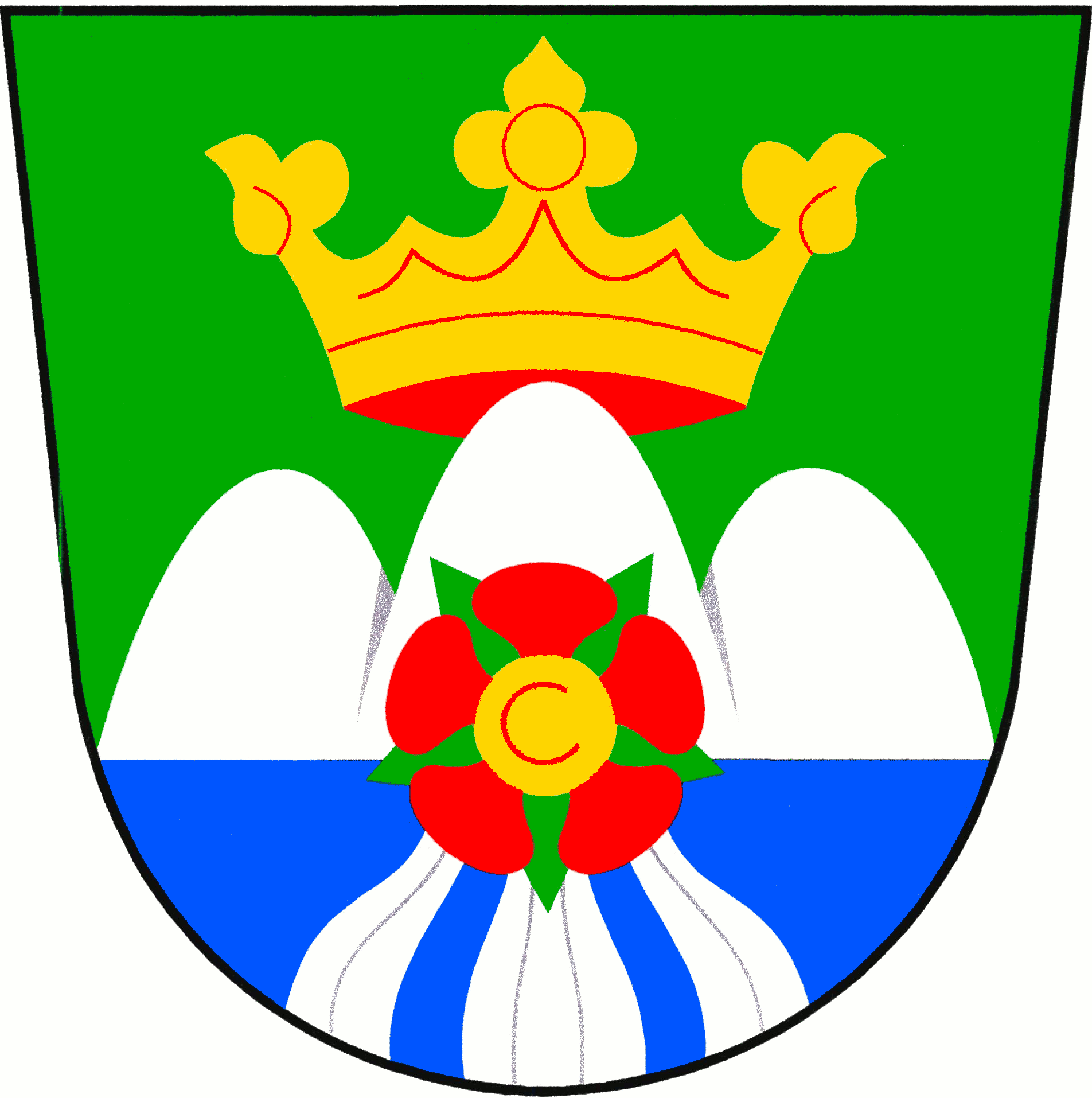
- Flag Coat of arms

- Location in the Czech Republic
- Coordinates: 50°31′37″N 16°9′5″E
- Country: Czech Republic
- Region: Hradec Králové
- District: Náchod
- First mentioned: 1256

Area
  - Total: 19.23 km^{2} (7.42 sq mi)
- Elevation: 405 m (1,329 ft)

Population (2026-01-01)
  - Total: 376
  - Density: 19.6/km^{2} (50.6/sq mi)
- Time zone: UTC+1 (CET)
  - Summer (DST): UTC+2 (CEST)
- Postal code: 549 74
- Website: www.obecbozanov.cz

Božanov (German: Barzdorf) is a municipality and village in Náchod District in the Hradec Králové Region of the Czech Republic. It has about 400 inhabitants. It is known for the Church of Saint Mary Magdalene, protected as a national cultural monument.

== Administrative division ==
Božanov consists of two municipal parts (in brackets population according to the 2021 census):

- Božanov (331)
- Studená Voda (1)

== Etymology ==
The name is derived from the personal name Božan. First, the local stream was named Božanův potok ("Božan's stream"), and the name of the stream was then transferred to the settlement.

== Geography ==
Božanov is located about 19 kilometres (12 mi) northeast of Náchod and 26 km (16 mi) south of the Polish city of Wałbrzych, on the border with Poland. It lies in the Broumov Highlands, in the Broumovsko Protected Landscape Area. The highest point is the Koruna hill at 769 m (2,523 ft) above sea level. The village of Božanov is situated in the valley of the stream Božanovský potok.

== History ==
The first written mention of Božanov is from 1256. It belonged to the Broumov estate, owned by the Benedictines. The hamlet of Studená Voda was founded in 1784. Božanov was a prosperous agricultural village for centuries, but due to industrialisation in the second half of the 19th century, there was a decrease in the population, who moved to the surrounding larger towns.

About 95% of the population was German-speaking in 1930. In 1938, Božanov was annexed by Nazi Germany and administered as part of the Reichsgau Sudetenland. After World War II, the German-speaking population was expelled and the municipality was resettled by Czechs from inland.

== Demographics ==
Historical population

Year	Pop.	±%
1869	1,855	—
1880	1,757	−5.3%
1890	1,662	−5.4%
1900	1,440	−13.4%
1910	1,340	−6.9%

Year	Pop.	±%
1921	1,282	−4.3%
1930	1,176	−8.3%
1950	599	−49.1%
1961	553	−7.7%
1970	453	−18.1%

Year	Pop.	±%
1980	347	−23.4%
1991	309	−11.0%
2001	332	+7.4%
2011	340	+2.4%
2021	332	−2.4%

Source: Censuses

== Transport ==
There are no railways or major roads passing through the municipality. In the municipality is the pedestrian border crossing Studená Voda / Radków with Poland.

== Sights ==
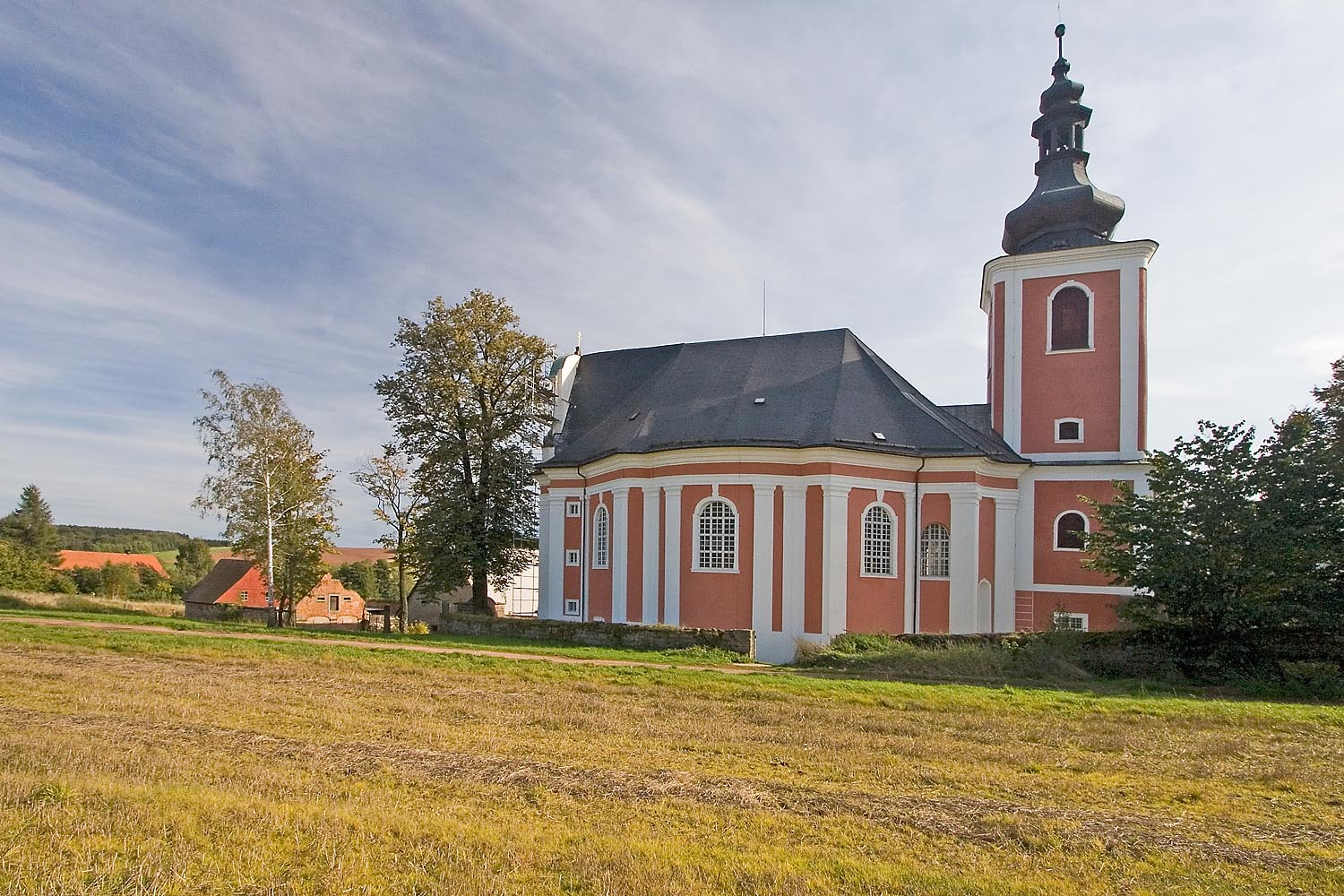
Church of Saint Mary Magdalene

The main landmark of Božanov is the Church of Saint Mary Magdalene. It was built in the Baroque style in 1735–1740 according to the design by architect Kilian Ignaz Dientzenhofer. For its value it has been protected as a national cultural monument since 2022.
