= Broumov Highlands =

Highlands in the Czech Republic

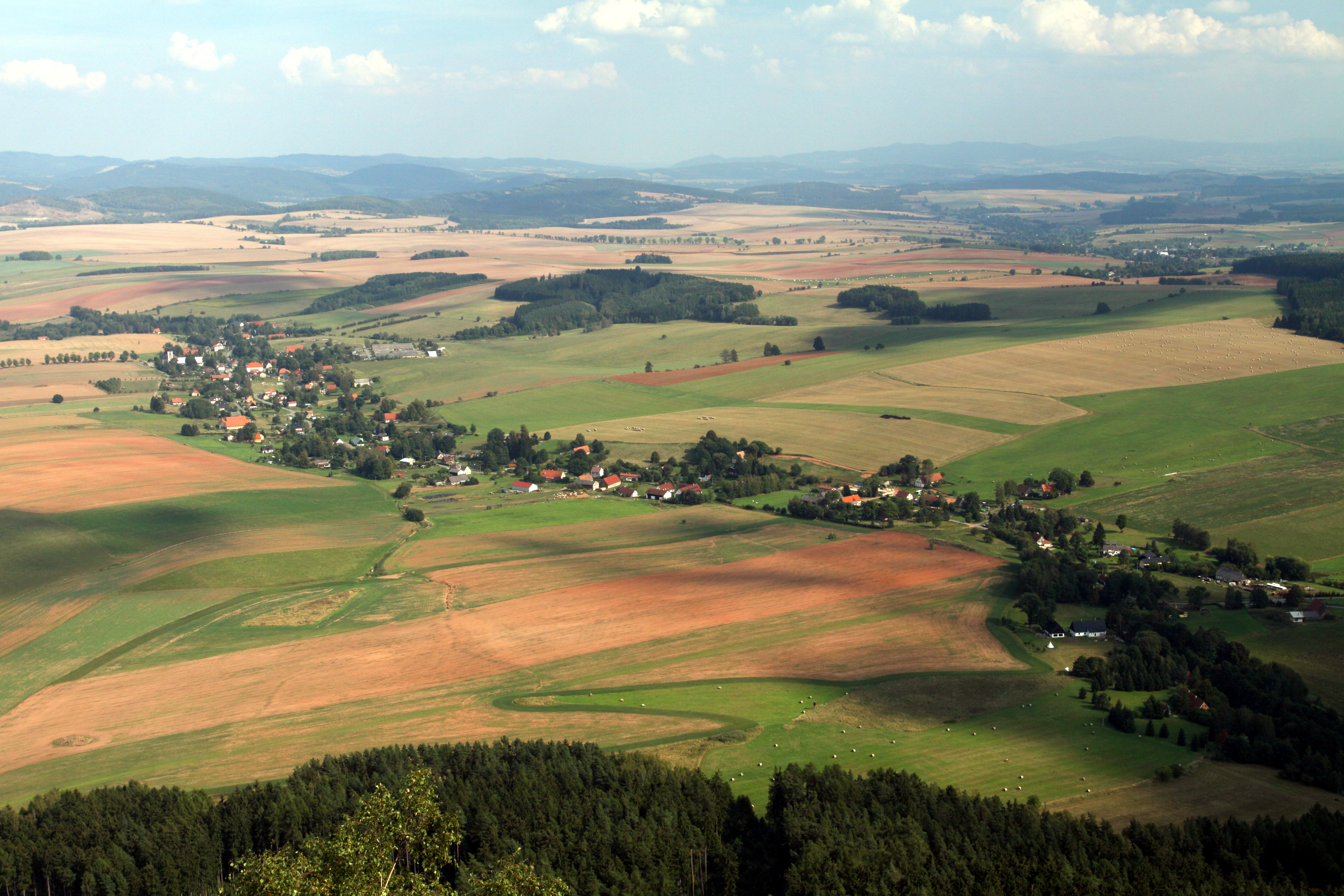
- View of Božanov

Highest point
- Peak: Královecký Špičák
- Elevation: 881 m (2,890 ft)

Dimensions
- Area: 535 km^{2} (207 mi^{2})

Geography
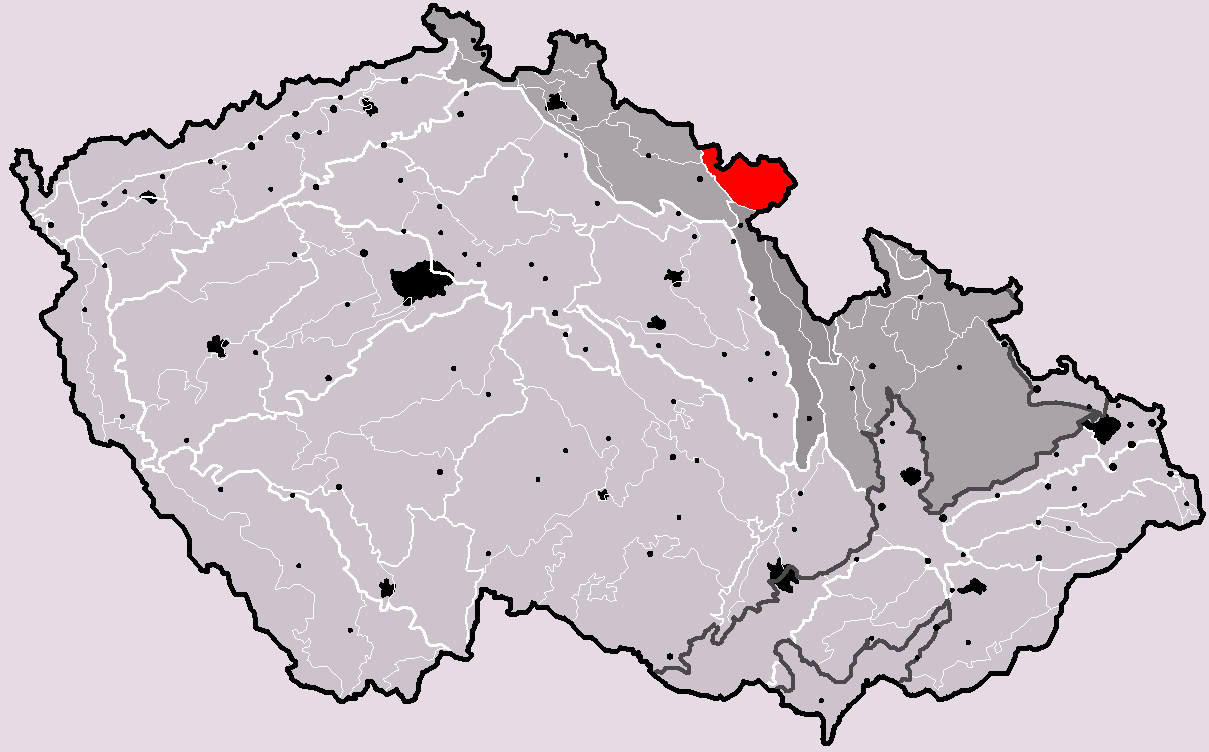
- Broumov Highlands in the geomorphological system of the Czech Republic
- Countries: Czech Republic, Poland
- Region: Hradec Králové
- Range coordinates: 50°35′N 16°11′E
- Parent range: Central Sudetes

Geology
- Rock type(s): Sandstone, marlstone

The Broumov Highlands (Czech: Broumovská vrchovina) are highlands and a geomorphological mesoregion of the Czech Republic. It is located in the Hradec Králové Region. It is a part of the Central Sudetes macroregion and the highest peak is Královecký Špičák at 881 m (2,890 ft) above sea level. Most of the highlands is protected as the Broumovsko Protected Landscape Area.

== Geomorphology ==
The Broumov Highlands is a mesoregion of the Central Sudetes within the Bohemian Massif. Common landform features include mesas, cuestas and rock towns. The mesoregion is further subdivided into the microregions of Žacléř Highlands, Police Highlands and Meziměstí Highlands.

The highest peaks of the Broumov Highlands are:

- Královecký Špičák, 881 m (2,890 ft)
- Ruprechtický Špičák, 880 m (2,887 ft)
- Szeroka, 845 m (2,772 ft)
- Mravenčí vrch, 842 m (2,762 ft) (Note: two different peaks with the same name)
- Široký vrch, 841 m (2,759 ft)
- Mravenčí vrch, 840 m (2,756 ft)
- Kopica, 803 m (2,635 ft)
- Světlina, 797 m (2,615 ft)
- Kozina, 796 m (2,612 ft)
- Čertův vrch, 790 m (2,592 ft)

== Geology ==
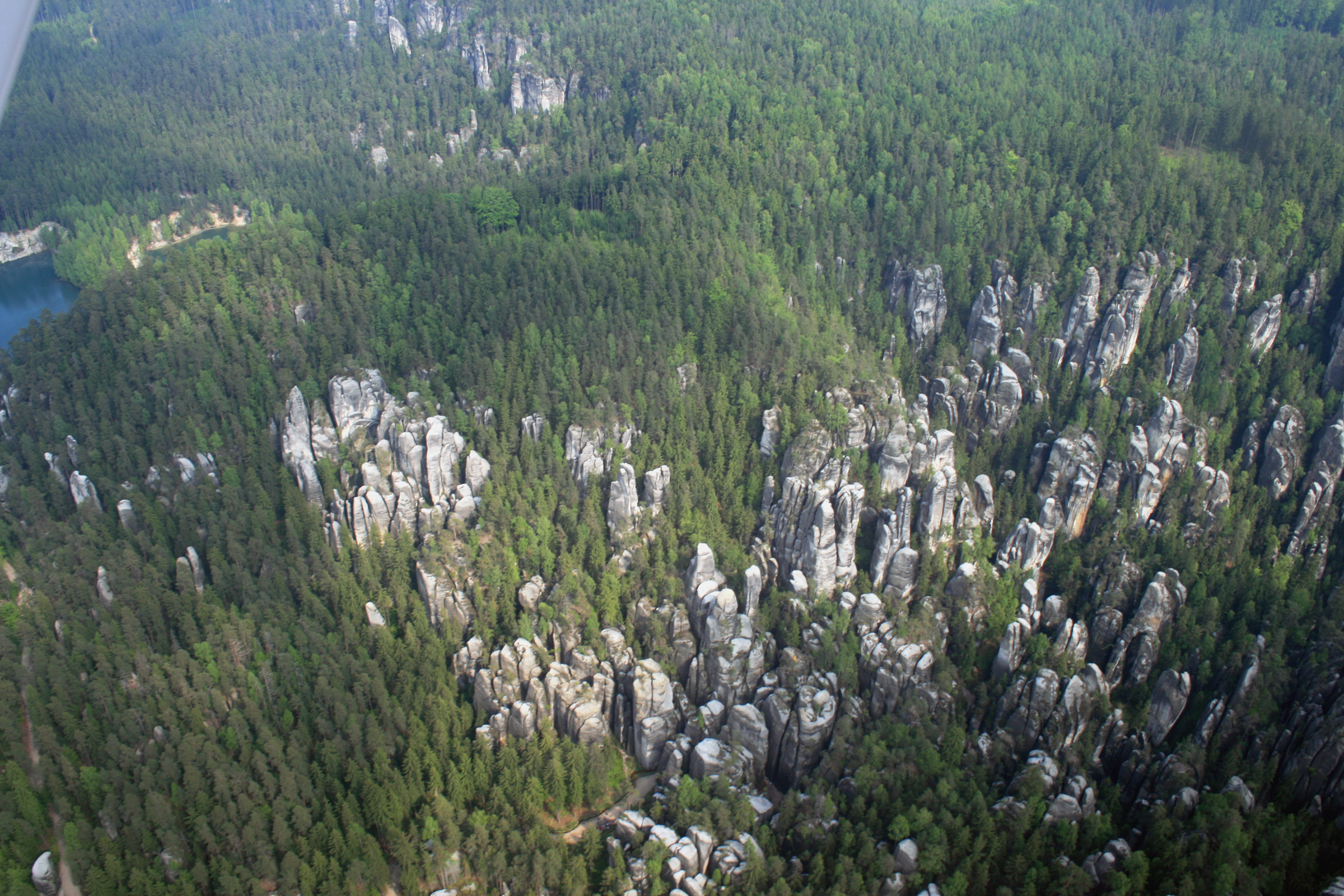
Adršpach-Teplice Rocks

The Broumov Highlands is valuable because there is a great diversity of rocks in a small area. There are terrestrial and marine sedimentary rocks from the Carboniferous, Triassic and Cretaceous periods (sandstone, marlstone), and rocks originating from Permian volcanic activity. Subsequent tectonic uplift and erosion shaped the present-day relief. A common feature in the relief are rock towns modelled in Cretaceous sandstones. The area of the rock towns is known as Adršpach-Teplice Rocks. The Broumov Highlands are also known for underground pseudo-karst phenomena, caves and chasms.

== Geography ==
The Broumov Highlands has an area of 535 km^{2} (207 sq mi) and an average elevation of 527 m (1,729 ft).

The area is drained mainly by the rivers Ścinawka and Metuje. There are significant reserves of groundwater here, from which the region is supplied with drinking water.

The most populous settlements in the territory are Broumov, Police nad Metují and Žacléř.

== Protection of nature ==
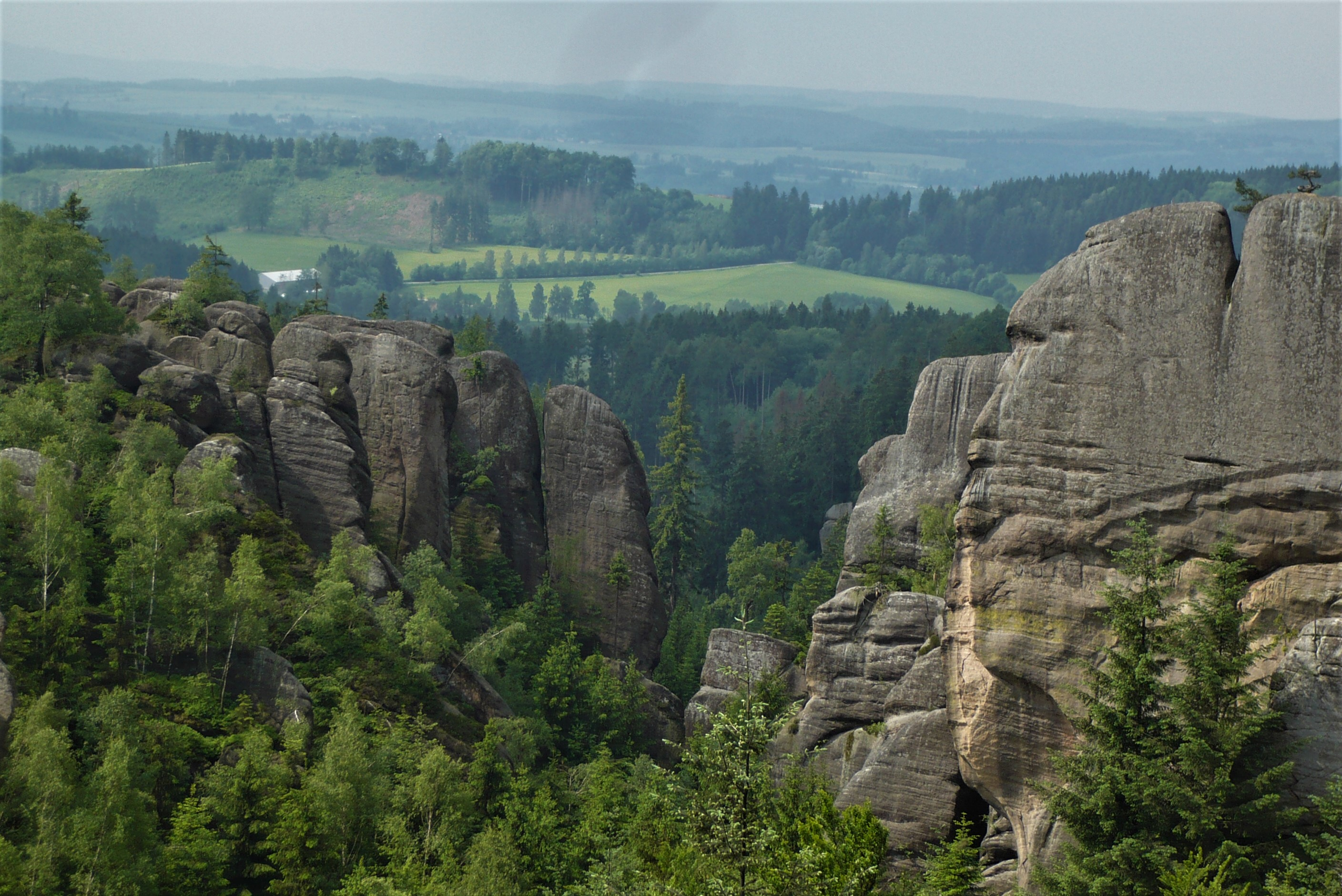
Broumovské stěny National Nature Reserve

Most of the Broumov Highlands is protected as the Broumovsko Protected Landscape Area due to their unique geological and ecological value. The protected landscape area was established in 1991 and borders the Stołowe Mountains National Park in Poland. The wider area of 570 km^{2} (220 sq mi) is also protected as the Broumovsko National Geopark.

The most valuable part of the Broumov Higlands and the Broumovsko Protected Landscape Area are the national nature reserves of Broumovské stěny and Adršpach-Teplice Rocks.
