= Hejtmánkovice =

- Municipality
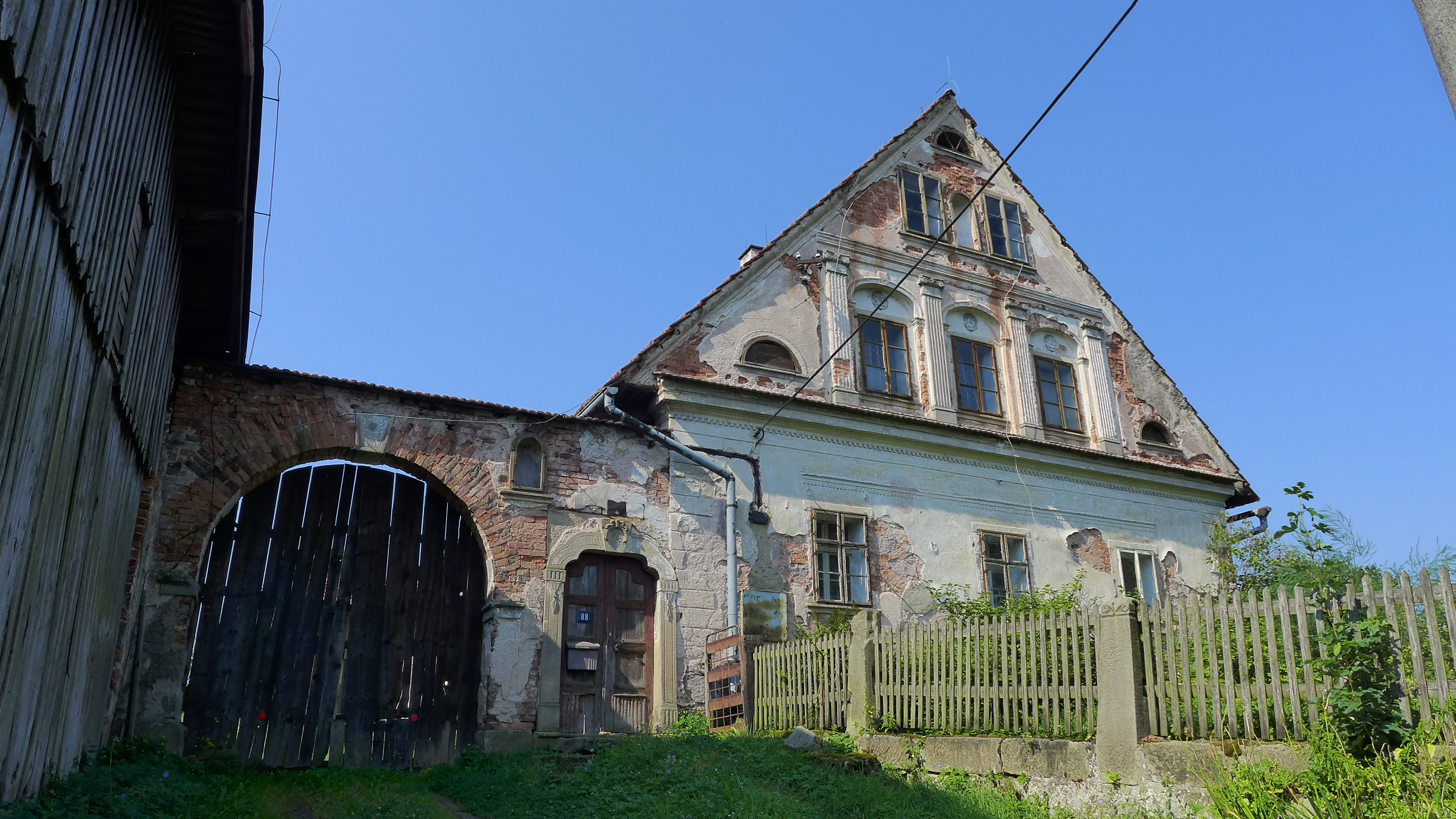
- A homestead in Hejtmánkovice

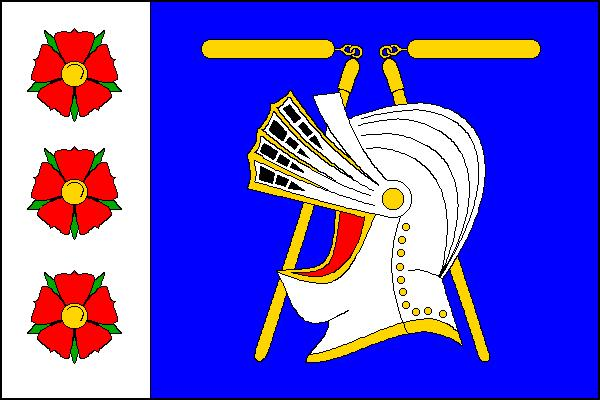
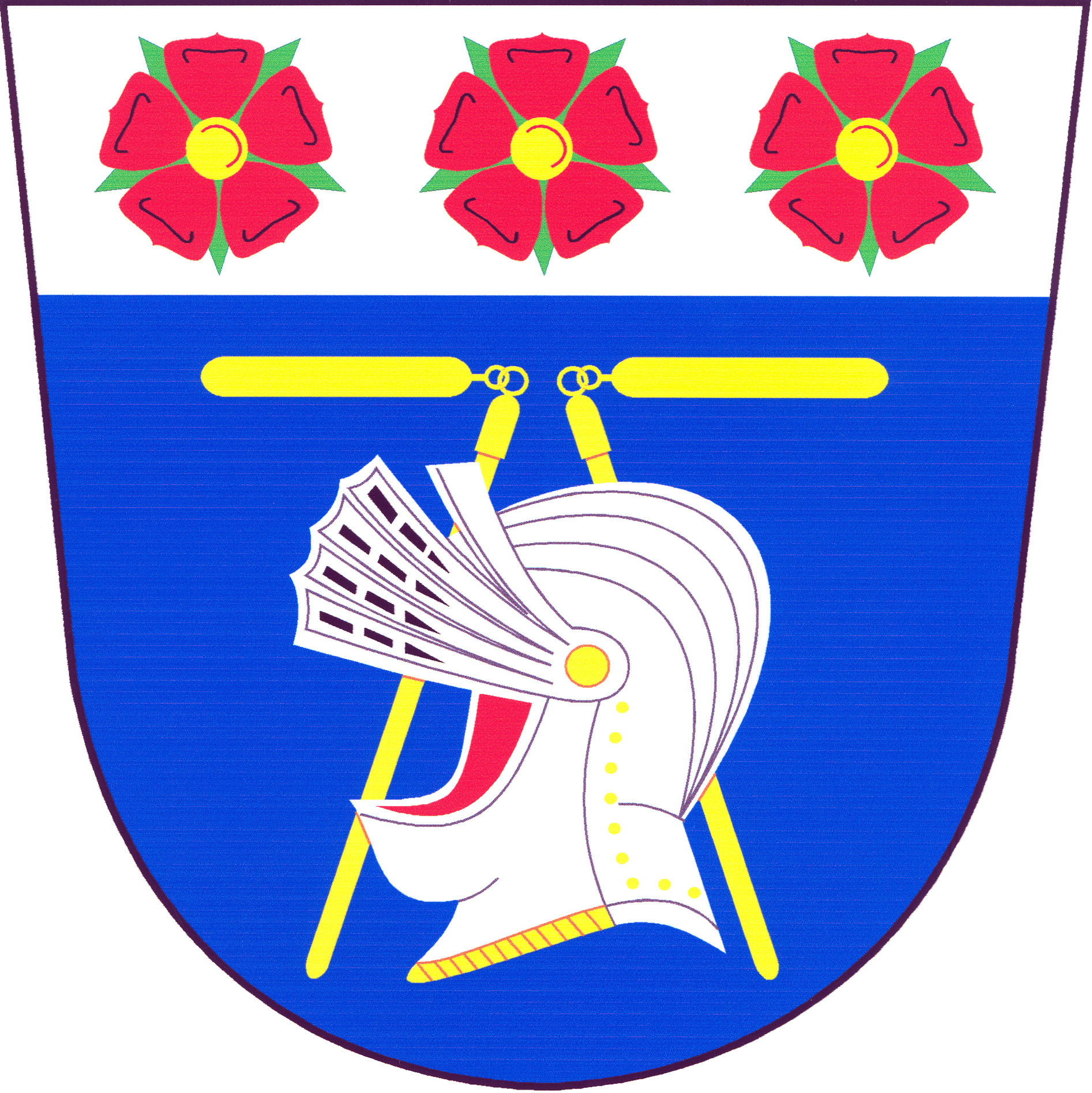
- Flag Coat of arms

- Location in the Czech Republic
- Coordinates: 50°35′57″N 16°17′58″E
- Country: Czech Republic
- Region: Hradec Králové
- District: Náchod
- First mentioned: 1296

Area
  - Total: 13.03 km^{2} (5.03 sq mi)
- Elevation: 418 m (1,371 ft)

Population (2026-01-01)
  - Total: 583
  - Density: 44.7/km^{2} (116/sq mi)
- Time zone: UTC+1 (CET)
  - Summer (DST): UTC+2 (CEST)
- Postal code: 550 01
- Website: www.hejtmankovice.cz

Hejtmánkovice (German: Hauptmannsdorf) is a municipality and village in Náchod District in the Hradec Králové Region of the Czech Republic. It has about 600 inhabitants.

== Demographics ==
Historical population
Year	Pop.	±%
1869	1,133	—
1880	1,234	+8.9%
1890	1,254	+1.6%
1900	1,386	+10.5%
1910	1,499	+8.2%
1921	1,322	−11.8%
1930	1,309	−1.0%
1950	769	−41.3%
1961	617	−19.8%
1970	568	−7.9%
1980	634	+11.6%
1991	564	−11.0%
2001	631	+11.9%
2011	618	−2.1%
2021	573	−7.3%
Source: Censuses
