= Sudety Wałbrzyskie Landscape Park =

Protected area in Poland

Coordinates: 50.6760°N 16.2612°E

- Park Krajobrazowy Sudetów Wałbrzyskich
- IUCN category V (protected landscape/seascape)
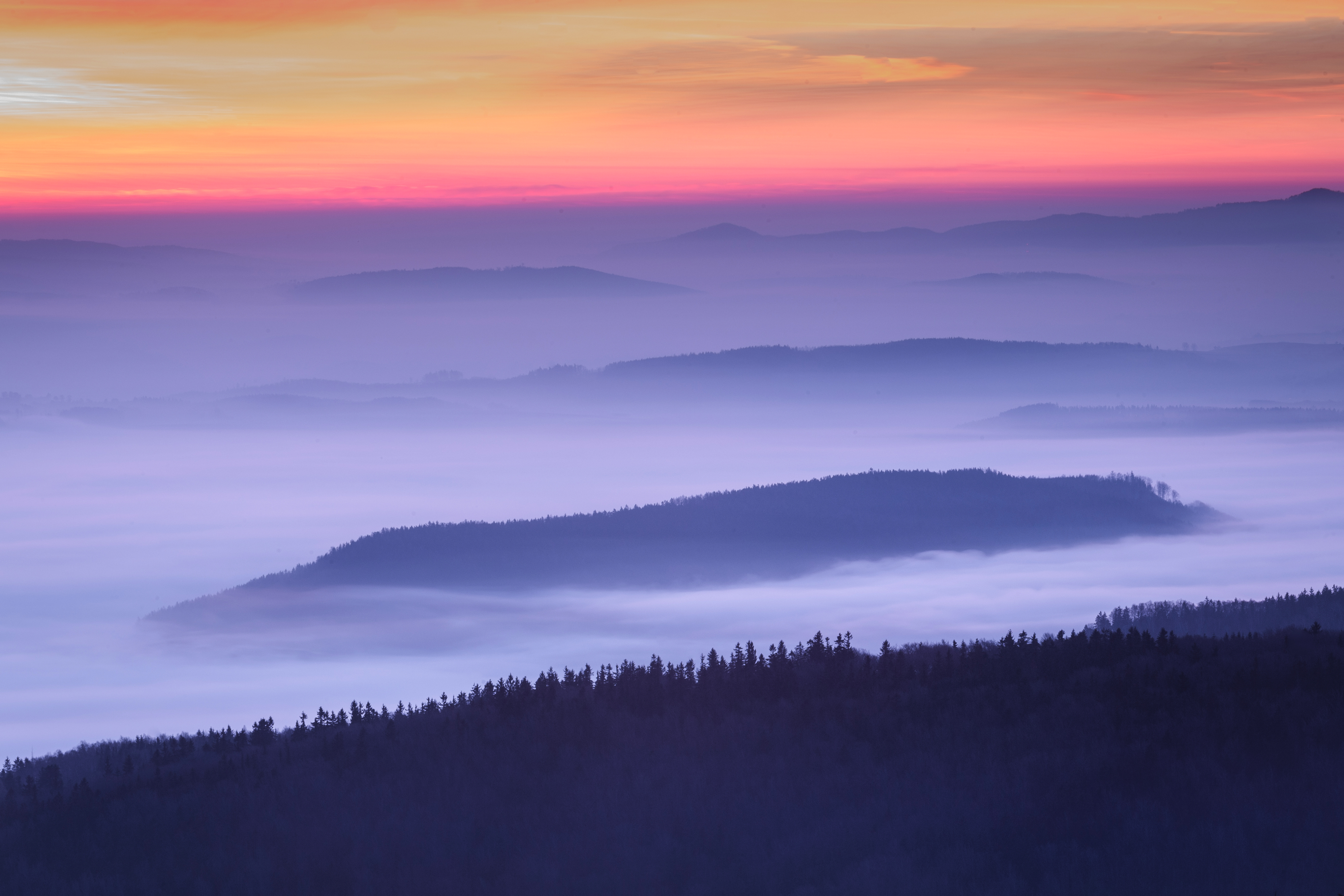
- Sunrise and morning mist over Sudety Wałbrzyskie Landscape Park
- Interactive map of Sudety Wałbrzyskie Landscape Park
- Location: Lower Silesian Voivodeship
- Area: 64.93 km^{2} (25.07 sq mi)
- Established: 1998
- Website: PK Sudetów Wałbrzyskich (in Polish)

Sudety Wałbrzyskie Landscape Park (Park Krajobrazowy Sudetów Wałbrzyskich) is a protected area (Landscape Park) in south-western Poland, established in 1998, covering an area of 64.93 square kilometres (25.07 sq mi).

The park lies within Lower Silesian Voivodeship, in Wałbrzych County (Gmina Czarny Bór, Gmina Głuszyca, Gmina Mieroszów).

There are no nature reserves or ecological lands in the park, but there are a dozen or so natural monuments, mainly protecting unique rock formations:

- Czerwone Skałki
- Małpia Skała
- Stożek Wielki
- Szczeliny Wiatrowe
- Zamkowa Góra

== Gallery ==
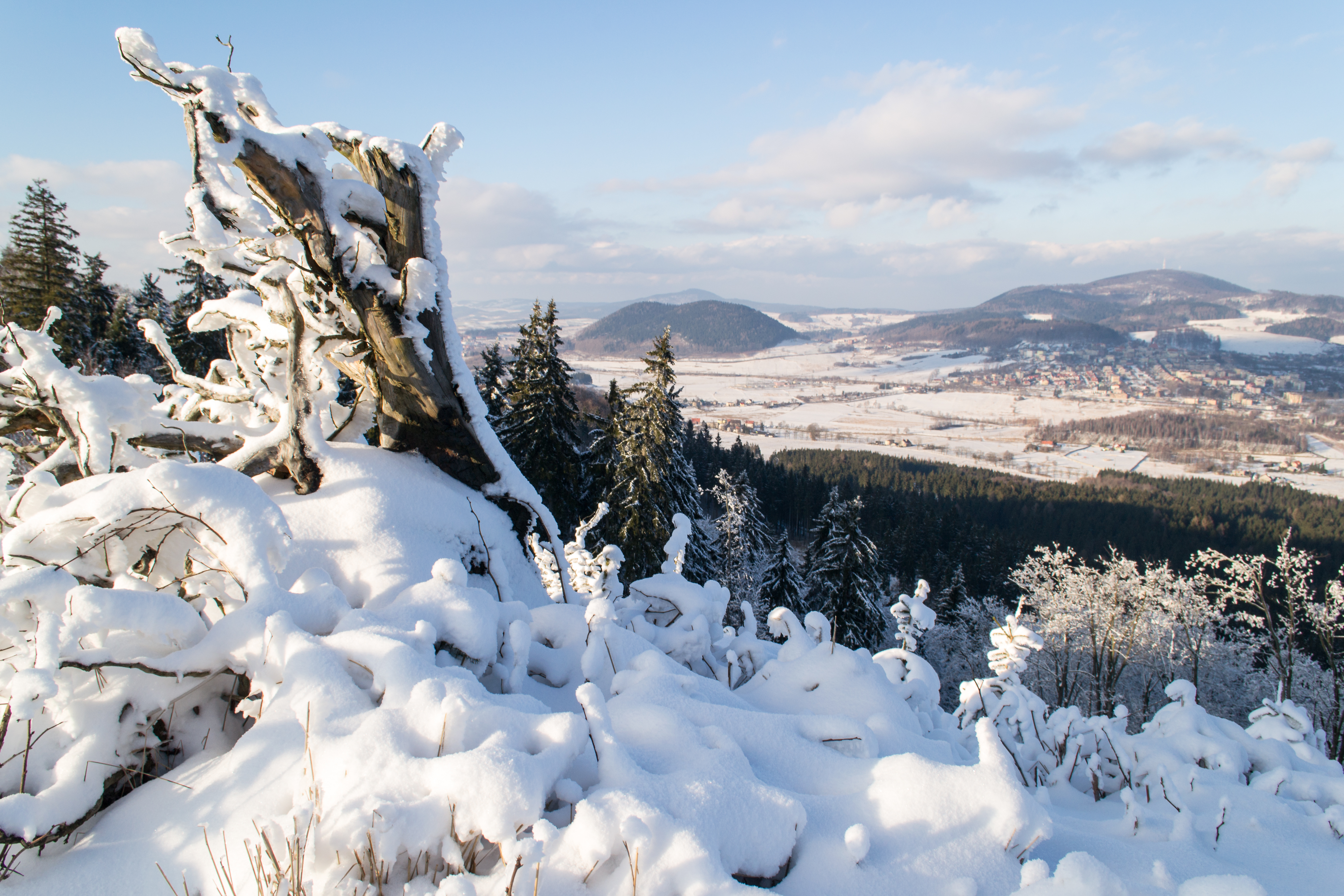
Winter

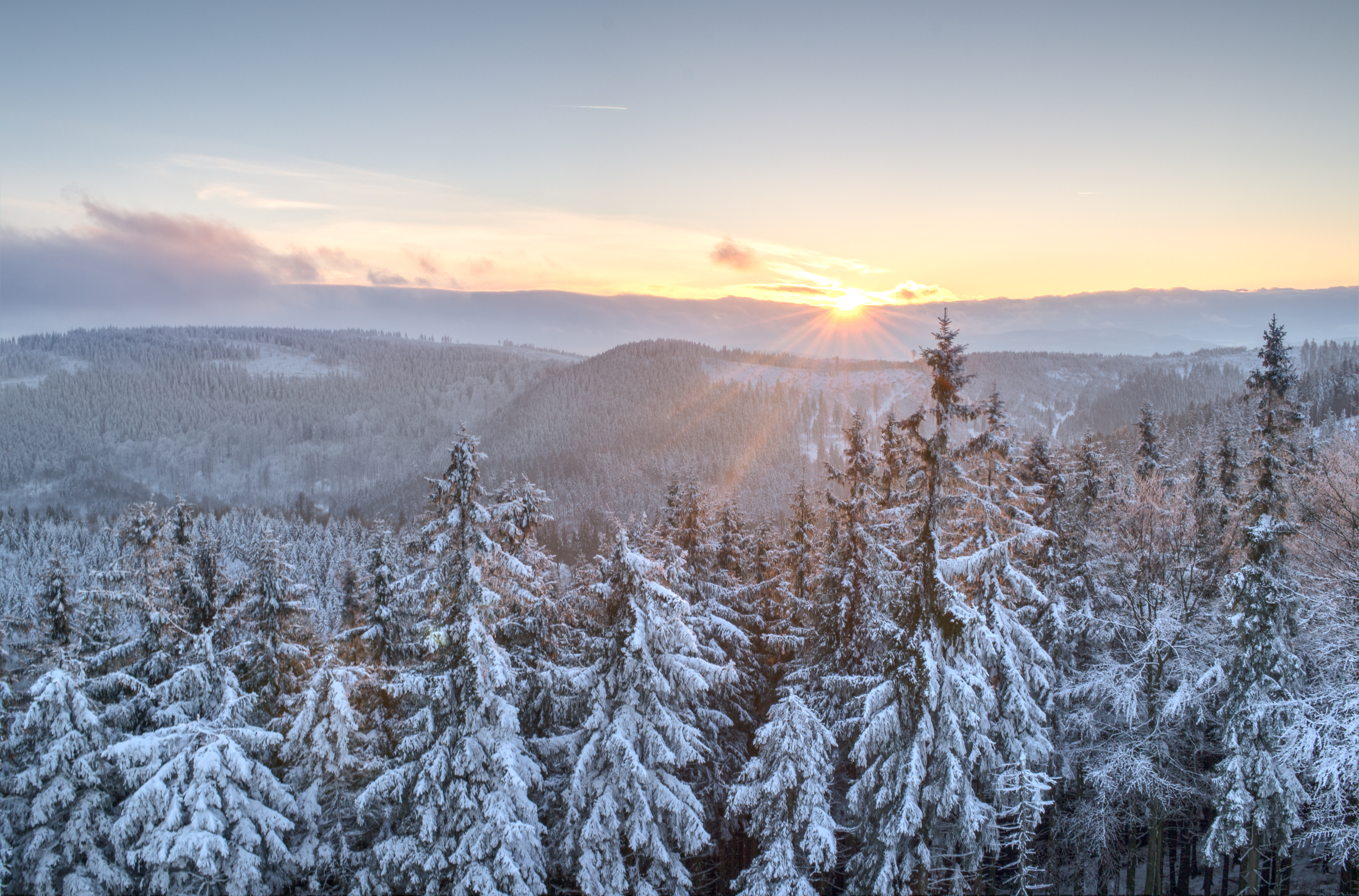
Sunset over the Dzikowiec massif

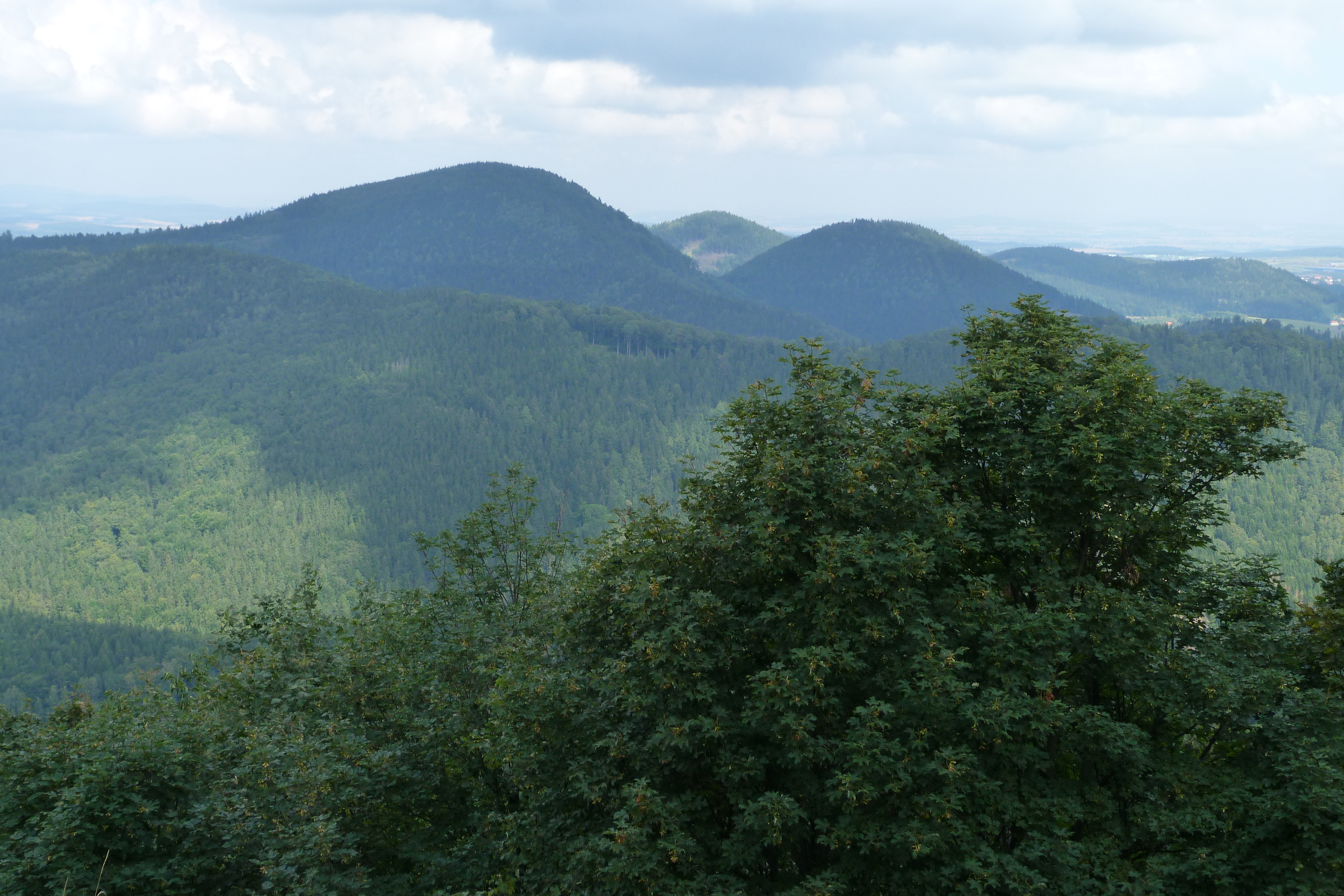
Summer

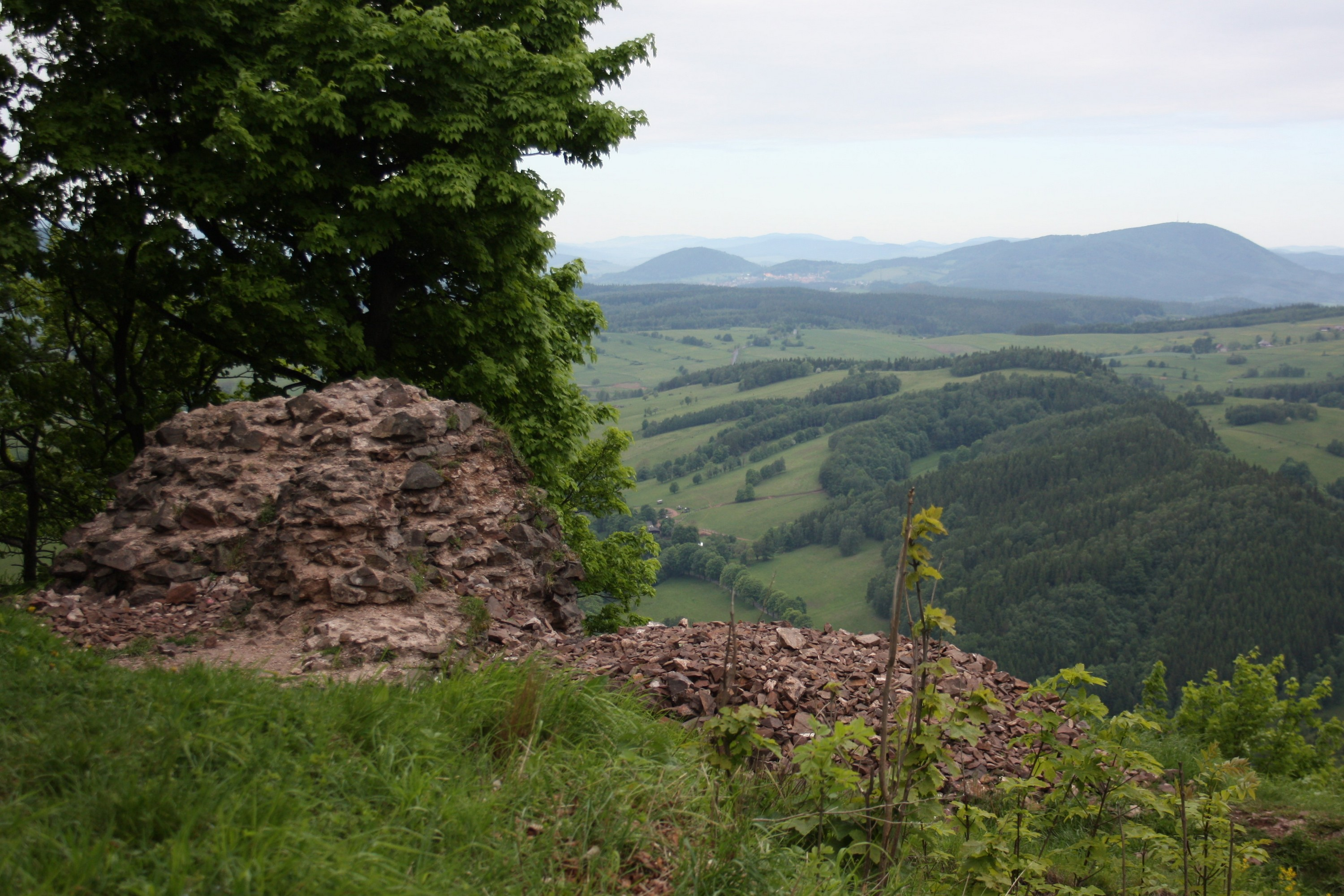

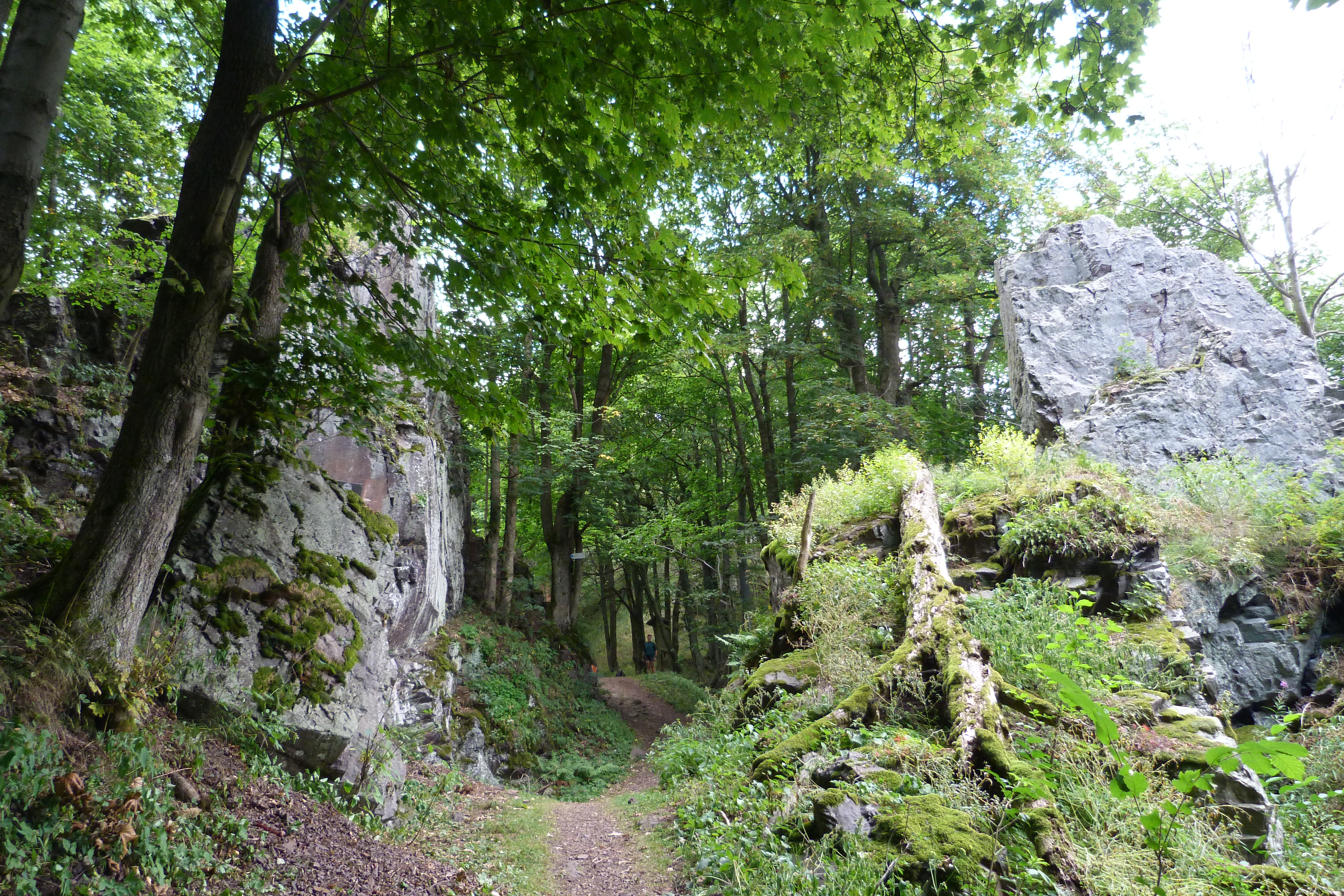
The pass known as Skalna bram (Rock Gate)

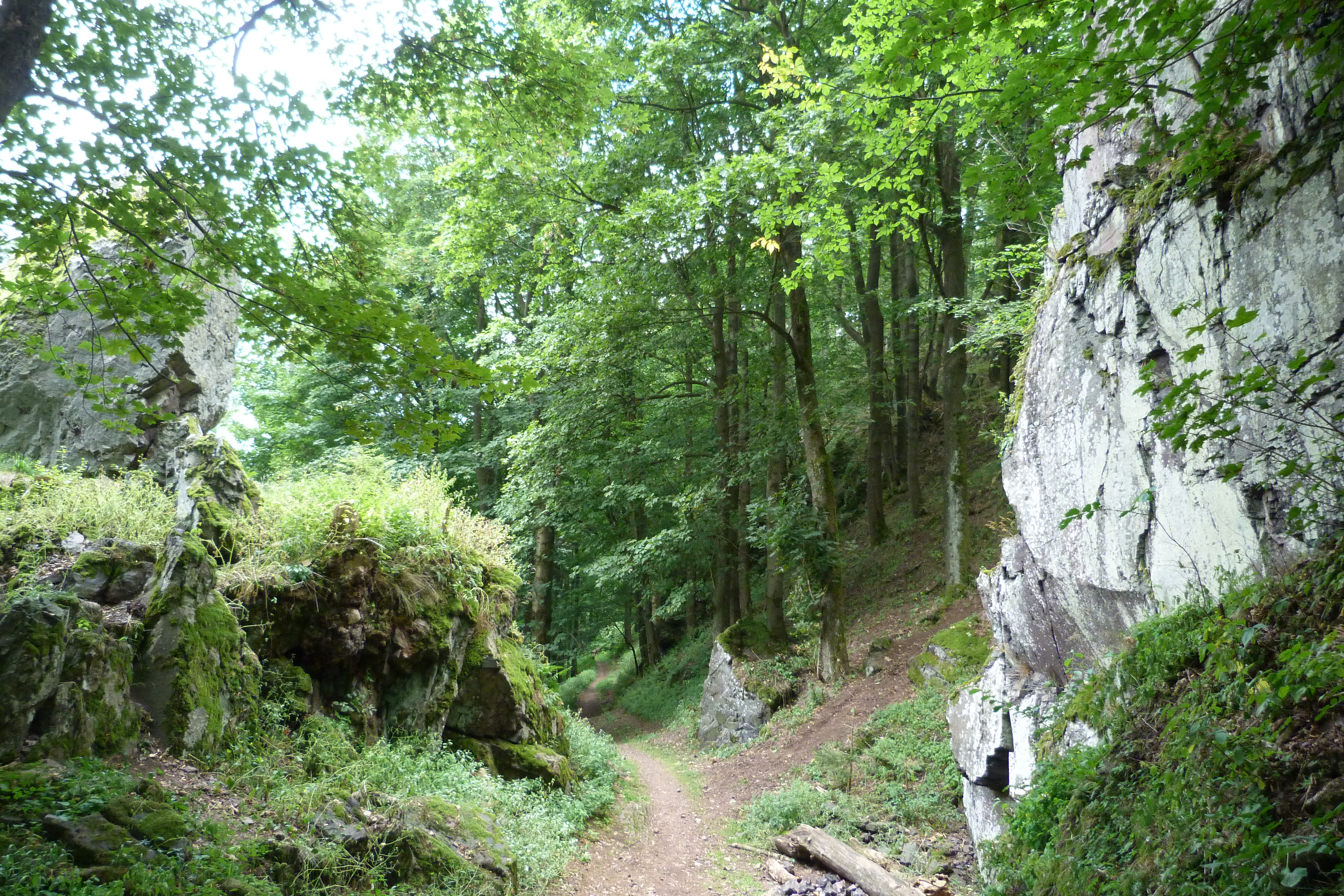
Rock Gate
