= Otovice (Náchod District) =

- Municipality
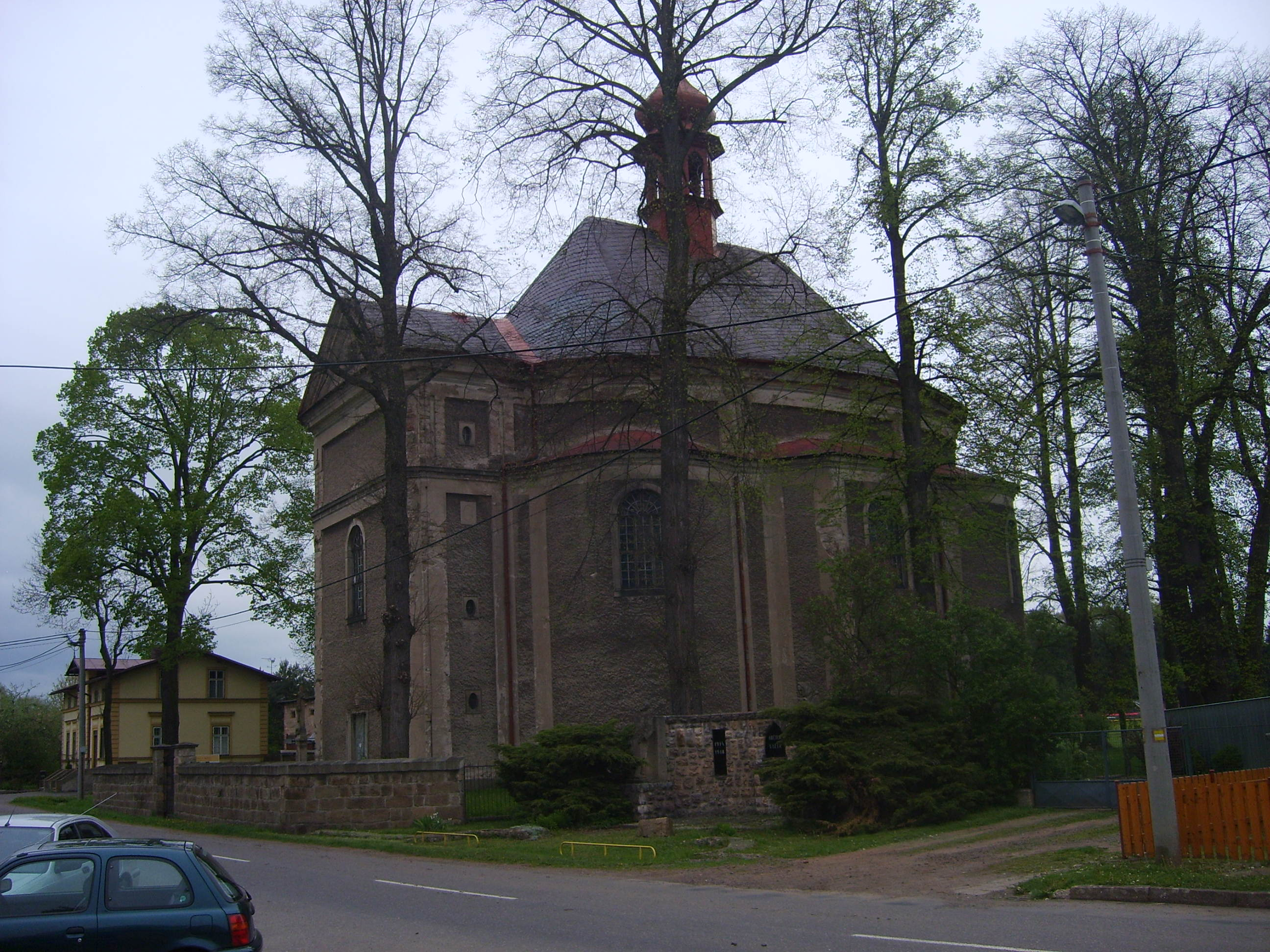
- Church of Saint Barbara

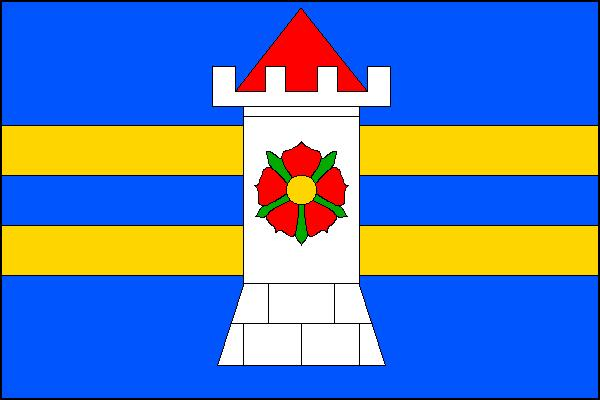
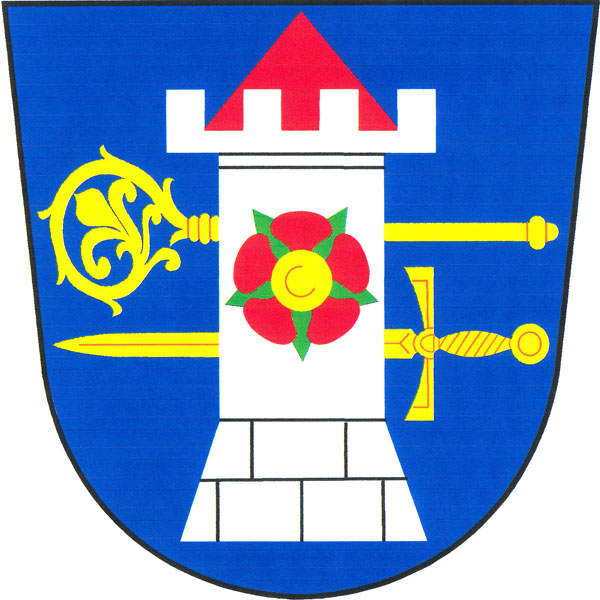
- Flag Coat of arms

- Location in the Czech Republic
- Coordinates: 50°33′26″N 16°23′16″E
- Country: Czech Republic
- Region: Hradec Králové
- District: Náchod
- First mentioned: 1300

Area
  - Total: 10.61 km^{2} (4.10 sq mi)
- Elevation: 354 m (1,161 ft)

Population (2026-01-01)
  - Total: 323
  - Density: 30.4/km^{2} (78.8/sq mi)
- Time zone: UTC+1 (CET)
  - Summer (DST): UTC+2 (CEST)
- Postal code: 549 72
- Website: www.obecotovice.cz

Otovice is a municipality and village in Náchod District in the Hradec Králové Region of the Czech Republic. It has about 300 inhabitants. It is located on the border with Poland. It is known for the Church of Saint Barbara, protected as a national cultural monument.

== Demographics ==
Historical population
Year	Pop.	±%
1869	1,117	—
1880	1,155	+3.4%
1890	1,087	−5.9%
1900	1,041	−4.2%
1910	1,088	+4.5%
1921	1,013	−6.9%
1930	956	−5.6%
1950	512	−46.4%
1961	557	+8.8%
1970	462	−17.1%
1980	435	−5.8%
1991	363	−16.6%
2001	378	+4.1%
2011	360	−4.8%
2021	335	−6.9%
Source: Censuses

== Sights ==
The main landmark of Otovice is the Church of Saint Barbara. It was built in the Baroque style in 1725–1727 by Kilian Ignaz Dientzenhofer, according to the design by his father Christoph Dientzenhofer. For its value it has been protected as a national cultural monument since 2022.
