= Broumovsko Protected Landscape Area =

Protected landscape area in the Czech Republic

- Chráněná krajinná oblast Broumovsko
- IUCN category V (protected landscape/seascape)
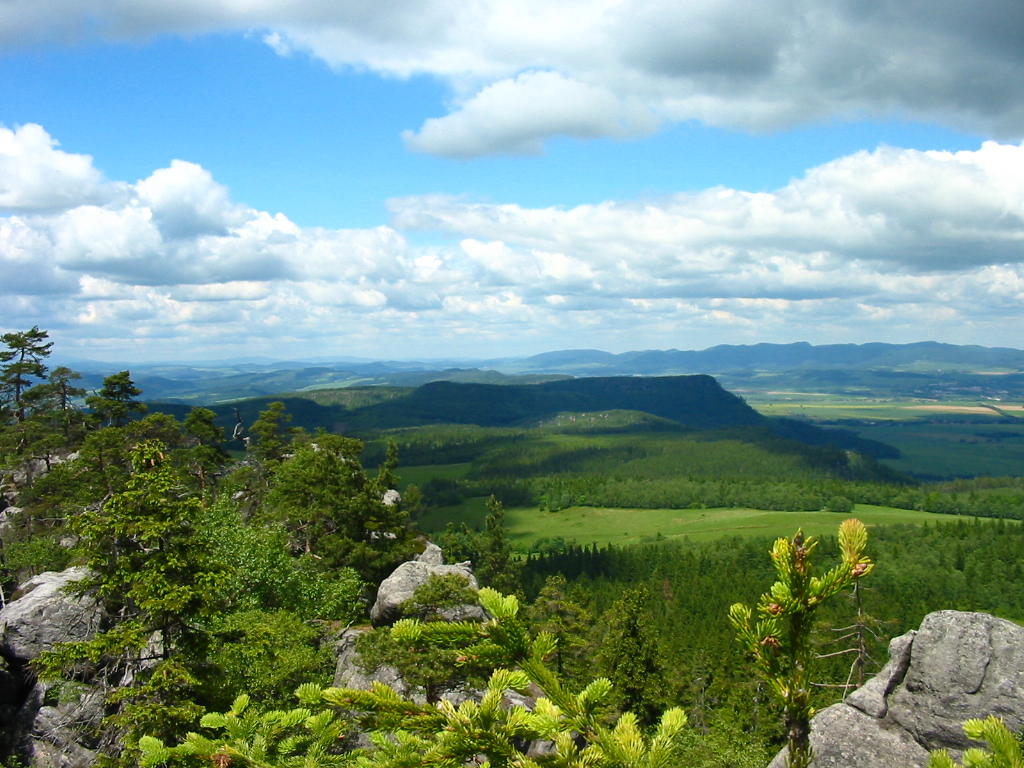
- View of Broumovsko landscape from Hejšovina

- Location within Czech Republic
- Location: Hradec Králové Region, Czech Republic
- Coordinates: 50°32′10″N 16°14′42″E
- Area: 430 km^{2} (170 sq mi)
- Established: 1991

The Broumovsko Protected Landscape Area (Czech: Chráněná krajinná oblast Broumovsko, abbreviated CHKO Broumovsko) is a protected landscape area in Hradec Králové Region in the Czech Republic, on the border with Poland. It is named after the town of Broumov. The highest point is Čáp with 785 metres (2,575 ft) a.s.l.

Broumovsko has been a protected landscape area since 1991. It is well known for its aesthetically and ecologically valuable landscape: extensive complexes of sandstone rock formation as well as cultural heritage, which comprises especially religious and folk architecture.

== Geology and nature ==
The Broumovsko Protected Landscape Area is composed of two different geologic formations, the Police highlands and the Broumov basin, separated by the ridge of the Broumov Walls. One of the main phenomena of this area is the cretaceous sandstone relief with vast rock towns, table mountains and cuestas. The deep cold gorges of the rock towns support rare floral life, and rich alpine vegetation is found here in inverse positions, while on the rock plateaus warm and dry pine woods can be found.

== Sights ==
For many centuries, the area was managed by Benedictine monks from Broumov Monastery; the cultural landscape of Broumovsko region was particularly influenced by the Baroque era. There is a unique set of ten Baroque churches built in the 18th century in villages around Broumov, on the territory of the Broumov monastic estate, by famous architects, father and son Christoph Dientzenhofer and Kilian Ignaz Dientzenhofer. Walled manors and country estates of the Broumov type are also highly remarkable.

== Small protected areas ==
There are several smaller protected areas within Broumovsko:

- National Nature Reserves: Adršpach-Teplice Rocks is one of the largest areas of sandstone rock formations in Central Europe. Broumov Walls is a 12 km-long mountain ridge with rock walls dipping steeply towards the Broumov basin. The Walls are renowned for their unique rock formations and there are numerous look-outs including Hvězda with a Baroque Chapel of the Virgin Mary.
- National nature monument: Polické stěny
- Nature reserves: Ostaš, Křížová cesta, Farní stráň
- Nature monuments: Borek, Kočičí skály, Šafránová stráň, Mořská transgrese (marine transgression), Pískovcové sloupky (sandstone columns)

== Gallery ==
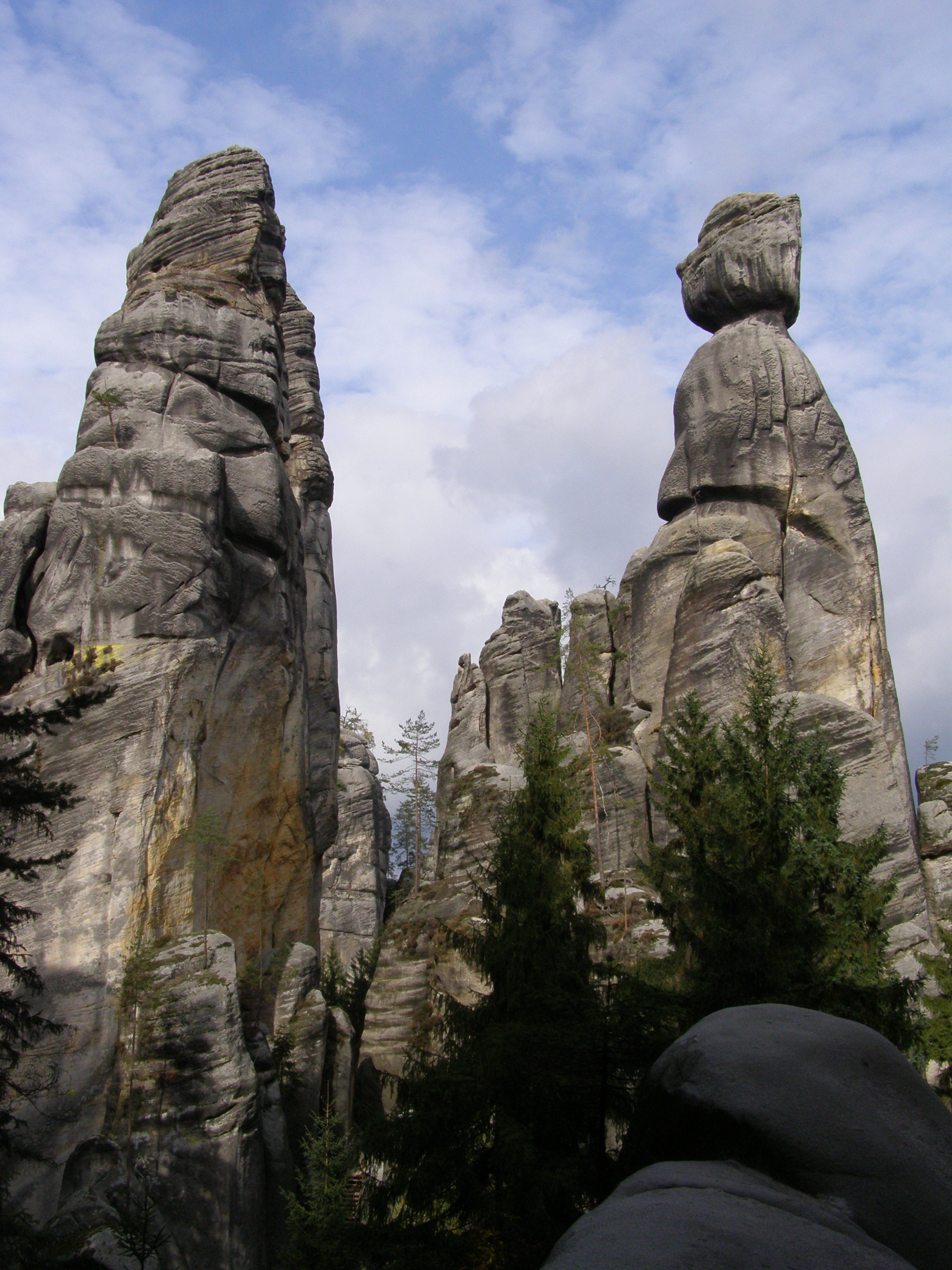
Adršpach Rocks: "Starosta's wife and Starosta"

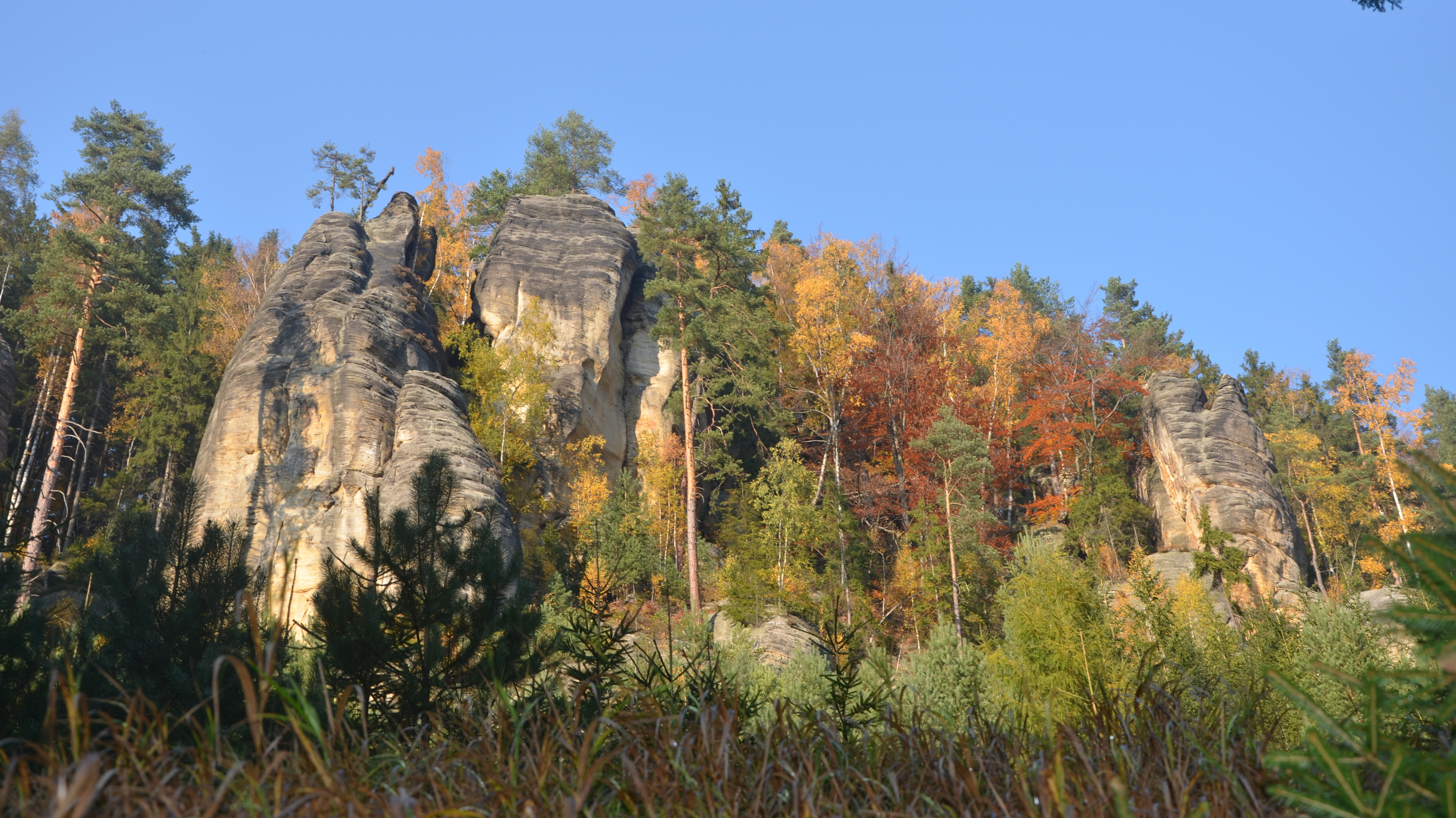
Teplice Rocks

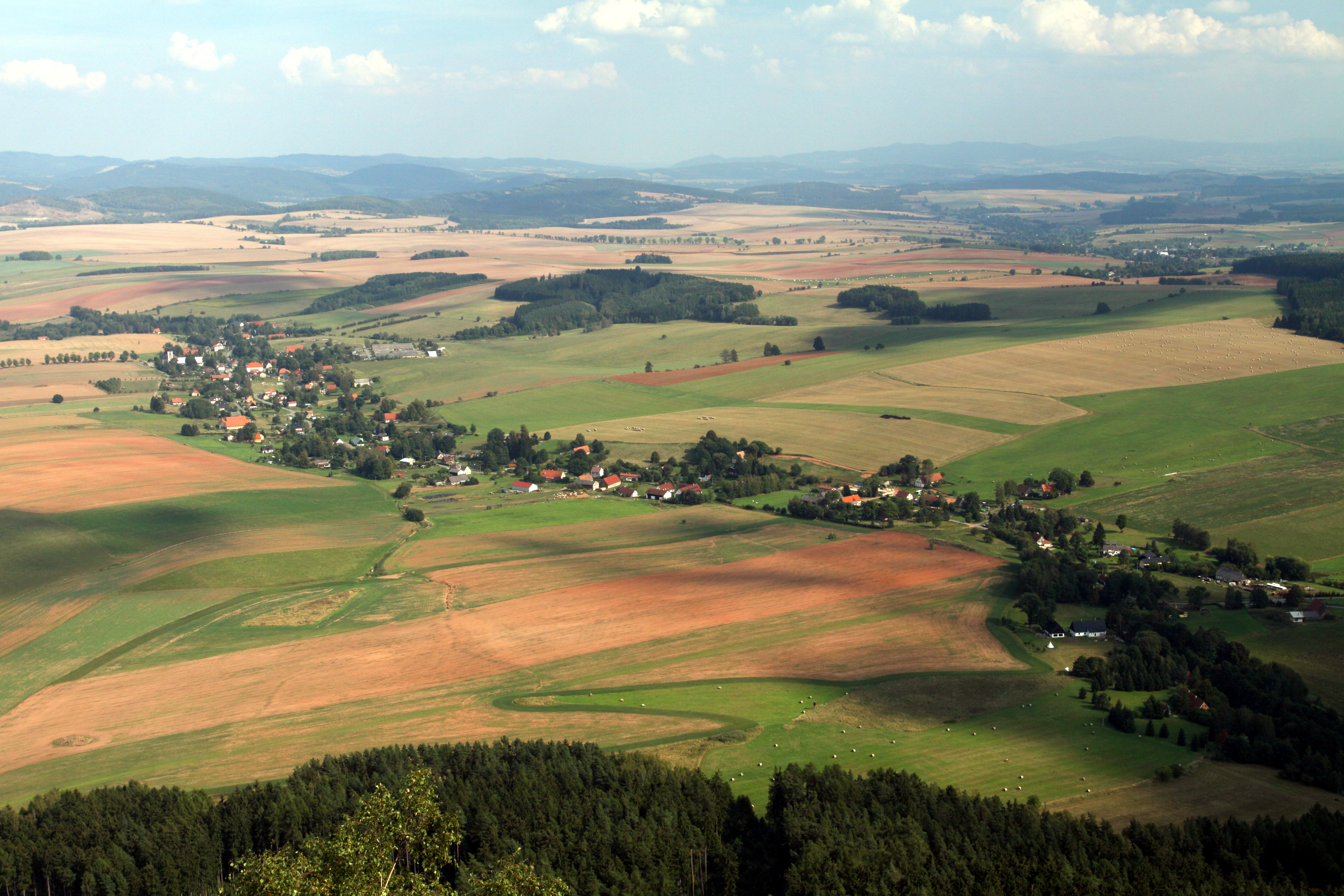
Božanov from national nature reserve Broumovské stěny

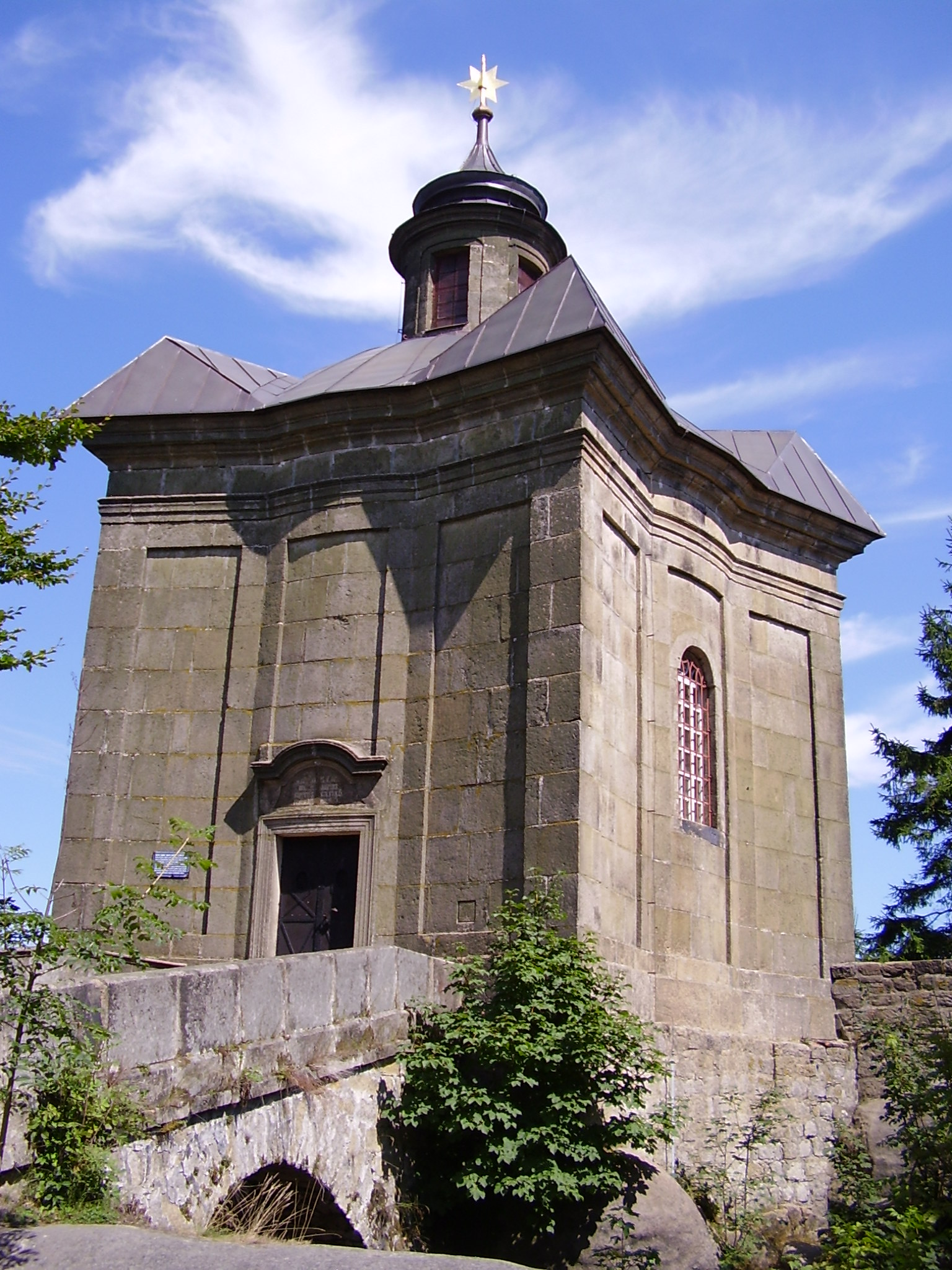
Hvězda Chapel

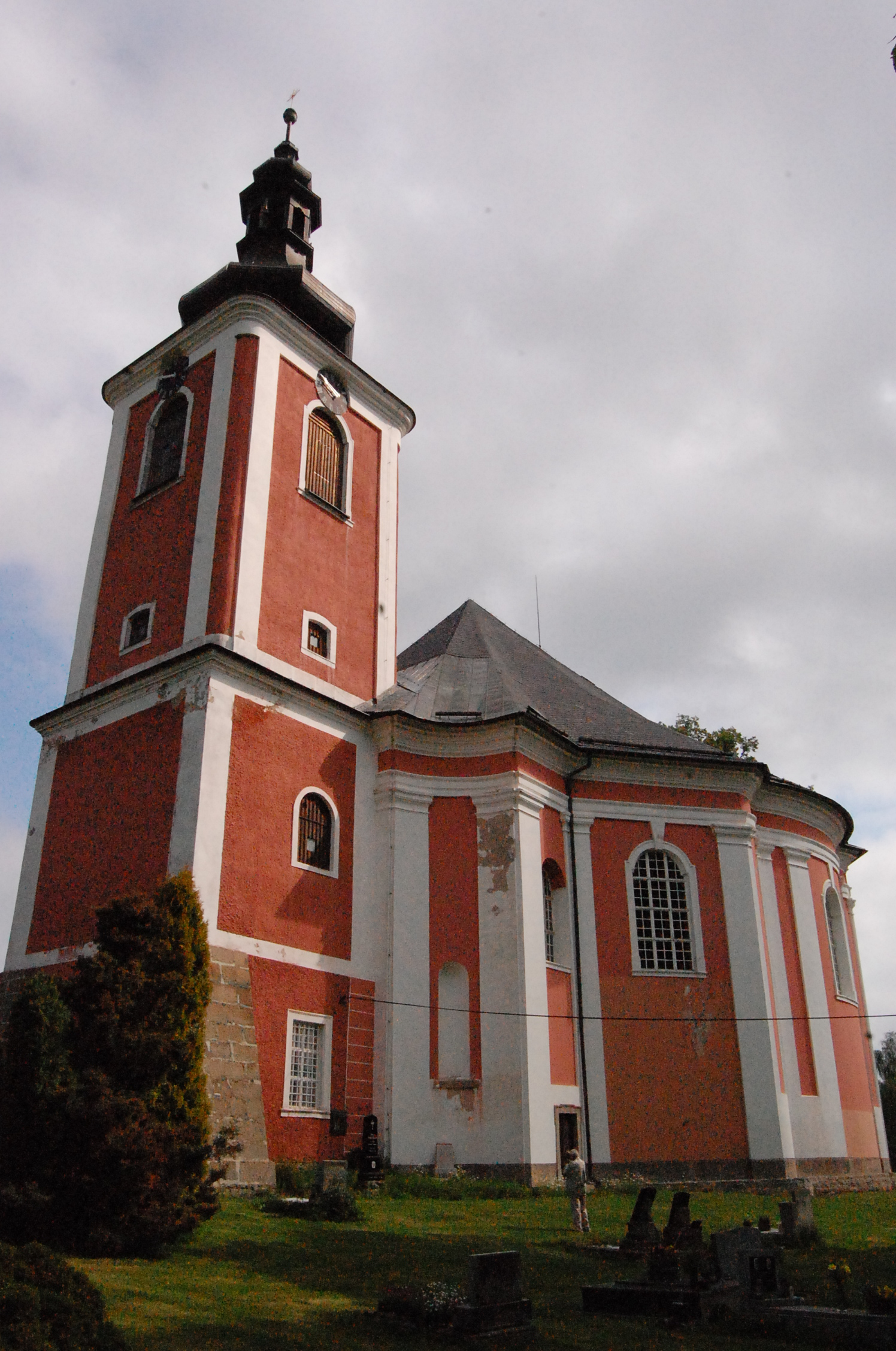
Church of Saint Mary Magdalene in Božanov

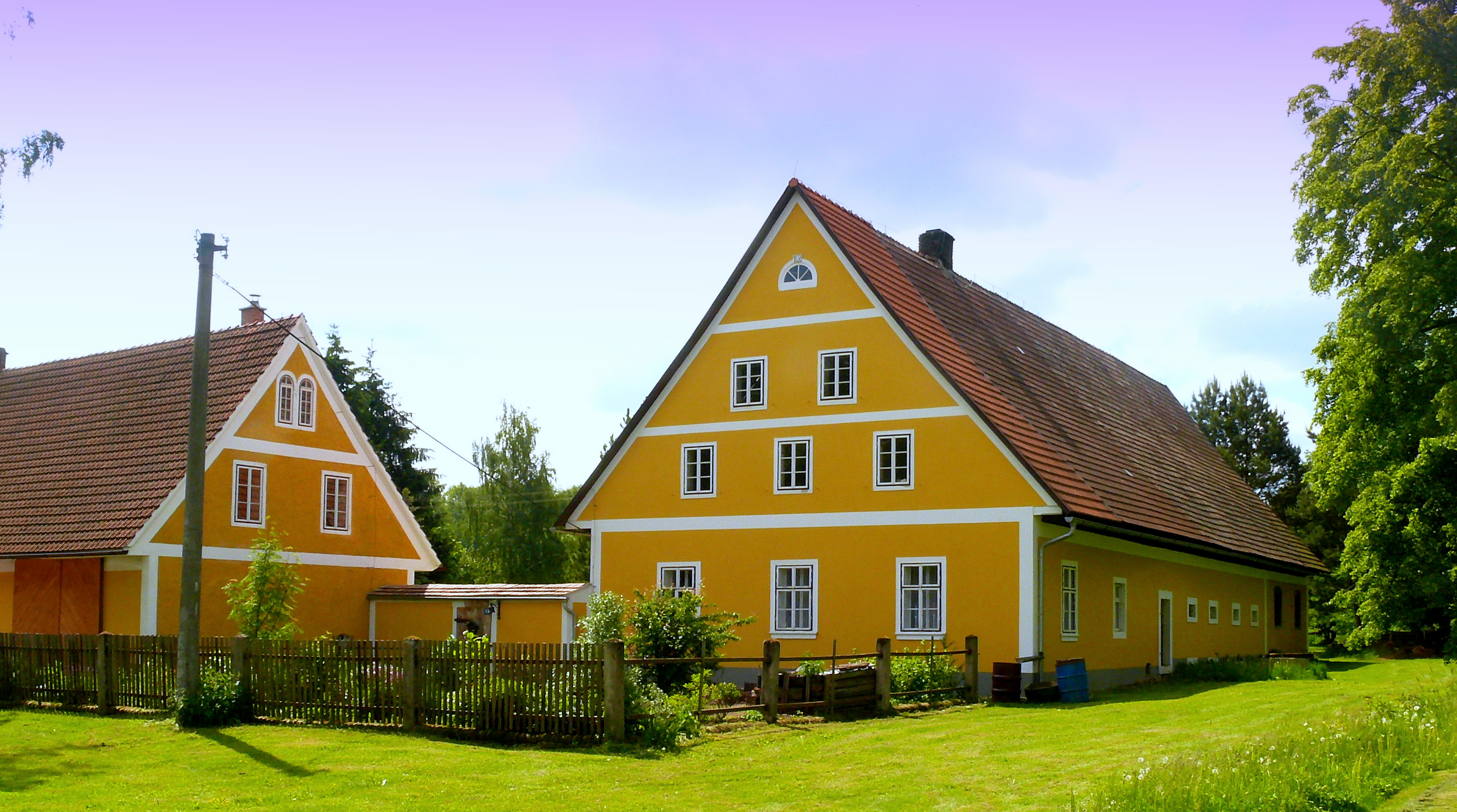
Broumovsko folk architecture
