= Žďár =

Žďár may refer to places in the Czech Republic:

- Žďár (Blansko District), a municipality and village in the South Moravian Region
- Žďár (Jindřichův Hradec District), a municipality and village in the South Bohemian Region
- Žďár (Mladá Boleslav District), a municipality and village in the Central Bohemian Region
- Žďár (Písek District), a municipality and village in the South Bohemian Region
- Žďár (Rakovník District), a municipality and village in the Central Bohemian Region
- Žďár, a village and part of Brzice in the Hradec Králové Region
- Žďár, a village and part of Chodský Újezd in the Plzeň Region
- Žďár, a village and part of Doksy in the Liberec Region
- Žďár, a village and part of Kaplice in the South Bohemian Region
- Žďár, a village and part of Levínská Olešnice in the Liberec Region
- Žďár, a village and part of Nalžovské Hory in the Plzeň Region
- Žďár, a village and part of Radíč in the Central Bohemian Region
- Žďár, a village and part of Tanvald in the Liberec Region
- Žďár, a village and part of Velké Chvojno in the Ústí nad Labem Region
- Žďár, a village and part of Veselá (Semily District) in the Liberec Region
- Žďár, a village and part of Ždírec (Plzeň-South District) in the Plzeň Region
- Žďár nad Metují, a municipality and village in the Hradec Králové Region
- Žďár nad Orlicí, a municipality and village in the Hradec Králové Region
- Žďár nad Sázavou, a town in the Vysočina Region
- Žďár u Kumburku, a village and part of Syřenov in the Central Bohemian Region
- Dolní Žďár, a municipality and village in the South Bohemian Region
- Pluhův Žďár, a municipality and village in the South Bohemian Region
- Veselý Žďár, a municipality and village in the Vysočina Region

== See also ==
- Žďárec
- Žďárek
- Žďárky
- Žďárná
- Žďárské vrchy
