= Horní Lhota =

Horní Lhota may refer to places in the Czech Republic:

- Horní Lhota (Ostrava-City District), a municipality and village in the Moravian-Silesian Region
- Horní Lhota (Zlín District), a municipality and village in the Zlín Region
- Horní Lhota, a village and part of Blansko in the South Moravian Region
- Horní Lhota, a village and part of Dolní Žďár in the South Bohemian Region
- Horní Lhota, a village and part of Načeradec in the Central Bohemian Region
- Horní Lhota, a village and part of Týnec (Klatovy District) in the Plzeň Region
