= Slavětín =

Slavětín may refer to places in the Czech Republic:

- Slavětín (Havlíčkův Brod District), a municipality and village in the Vysočina Region
- Slavětín (Louny District), a market town in the Ústí nad Labem Region
- Slavětín (Olomouc District), a municipality and village in the Olomouc Region
- Slavětín, a village and part of Hudčice in the Central Bohemian Region
- Slavětín, a village and part of Načeradec in the Central Bohemian Region
- Miřetice, a village and part of Písečné (Jindřichův Hradec District) in the South Bohemian Region
- Slavětín nad Metují, a municipality and village in the Hradec Králové Region
