= Dolní Lhota =

Horní Lhota may refer to places in the Czech Republic:

- Dolní Lhota (Ostrava-City District), a municipality and village in the Moravian-Silesian Region
- Dolní Lhota (Zlín District), a municipality and village in the Zlín Region
- Dolní Lhota, a village and part of Blansko in the South Moravian Region
- Dolní Lhota, a village and part of Janovice nad Úhlavou in the Plzeň Region
- Dolní Lhota, a village and part of Načeradec in the Central Bohemian Region
- Dolní Lhota, a village and part of Stráž nad Nežárkou in the South Bohemian Region
- Dolní Lhota, a village and part of Svojanov in the Pardubice Region
