= Dolní Lhota (Zlín District) =

- Municipality
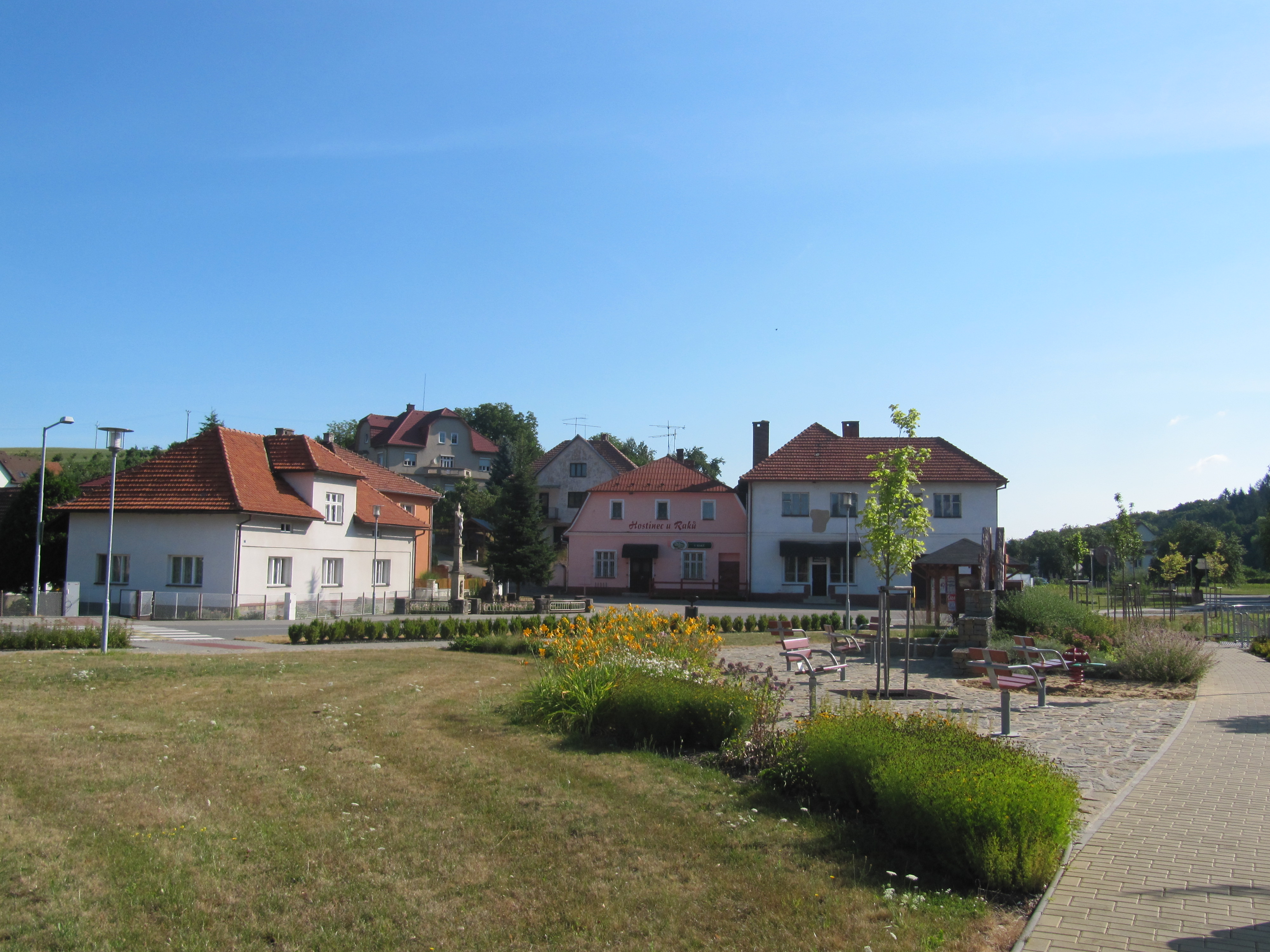
- Centre of Dolní Lhota

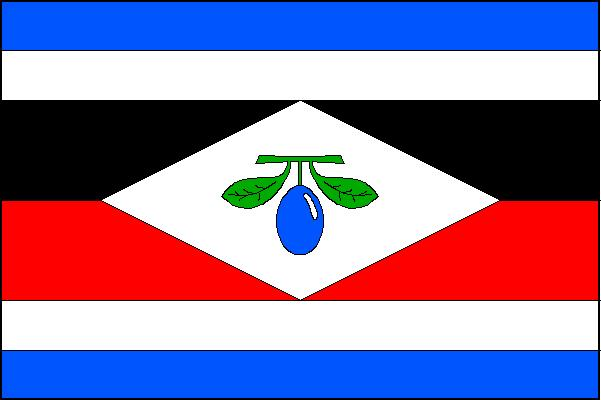
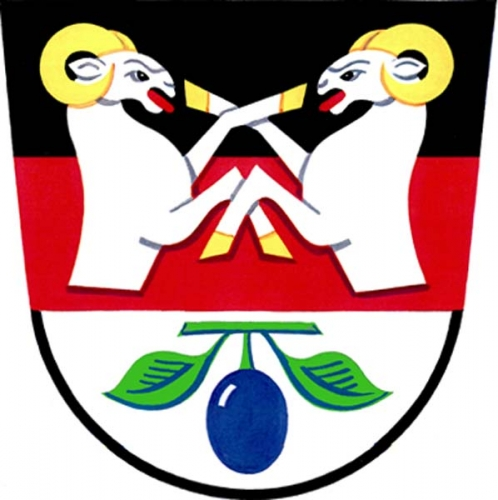
- Flag Coat of arms

- Location in the Czech Republic
- Coordinates: 49°8′14″N 17°48′45″E
- Country: Czech Republic
- Region: Zlín
- District: Zlín
- First mentioned: 1449

Area
  - Total: 5.01 km^{2} (1.93 sq mi)
- Elevation: 299 m (981 ft)

Population (2026-01-01)
  - Total: 702
  - Density: 140/km^{2} (363/sq mi)
- Time zone: UTC+1 (CET)
  - Summer (DST): UTC+2 (CEST)
- Postal code: 763 23
- Website: www.dolni-lhota.cz

Dolní Lhota is a municipality and village in Zlín District in the Zlín Region of the Czech Republic. It has about 700 inhabitants.

Dolní Lhota lies approximately 16 kilometres (10 mi) south-east of Zlín and 267 km (166 mi) south-east of Prague.

== Demographics ==
Historical population
Year	Pop.	±%
1869	285	—
1880	314	+10.2%
1890	310	−1.3%
1900	296	−4.5%
1910	330	+11.5%
1921	298	−9.7%
1930	303	+1.7%
1950	302	−0.3%
1961	378	+25.2%
1970	382	+1.1%
1980	457	+19.6%
1991	507	+10.9%
2001	565	+11.4%
2011	601	+6.4%
2021	638	+6.2%
Source: Censuses
