= Žďár (Jindřichův Hradec District) =

- Municipality
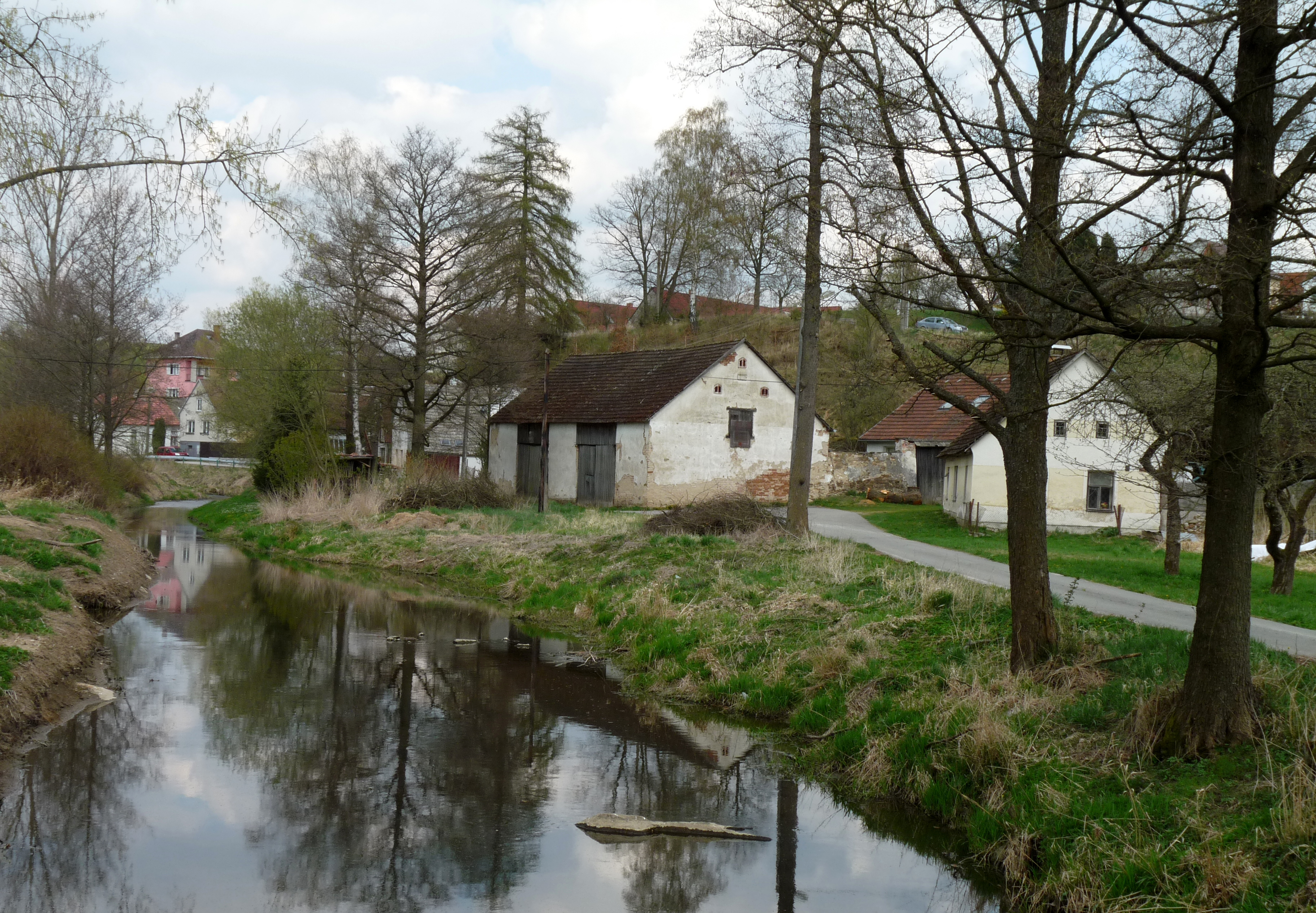
- Kamenice River in Žďár

- Location in the Czech Republic
- Coordinates: 49°15′15″N 15°4′36″E
- Country: Czech Republic
- Region: South Bohemian
- District: Jindřichův Hradec
- First mentioned: 1549

Area
  - Total: 7.13 km^{2} (2.75 sq mi)
- Elevation: 505 m (1,657 ft)

Population (2026-01-01)
  - Total: 125
  - Density: 17.5/km^{2} (45.4/sq mi)
- Time zone: UTC+1 (CET)
  - Summer (DST): UTC+2 (CEST)
- Postal code: 378 42
- Website: www.obec-zdar.cz

Žďár is a municipality and village in Jindřichův Hradec District in the South Bohemian Region of the Czech Republic. It has about 100 inhabitants.

Žďár lies approximately 14 kilometres (9 mi) north-east of Jindřichův Hradec, 55 km (34 mi) north-east of České Budějovice, and 105 km (65 mi) south-east of Prague.

== Administrative division ==
Žďár consists of two municipal parts (in brackets population according to the 2021 census):

- Žďár (99)
- Malá Rosička (15)

== Demographics ==
Historical population
Year	Pop.	±%
1869	271	—
1880	323	+19.2%
1890	274	−15.2%
1900	300	+9.5%
1910	316	+5.3%
1921	308	−2.5%
1930	255	−17.2%
1950	179	−29.8%
1961	157	−12.3%
1970	138	−12.1%
1980	103	−25.4%
1991	71	−31.1%
2001	69	−2.8%
2011	95	+37.7%
2021	114	+20.0%
Source: Censuses
