= Žďár (Rakovník District) =

- Municipality
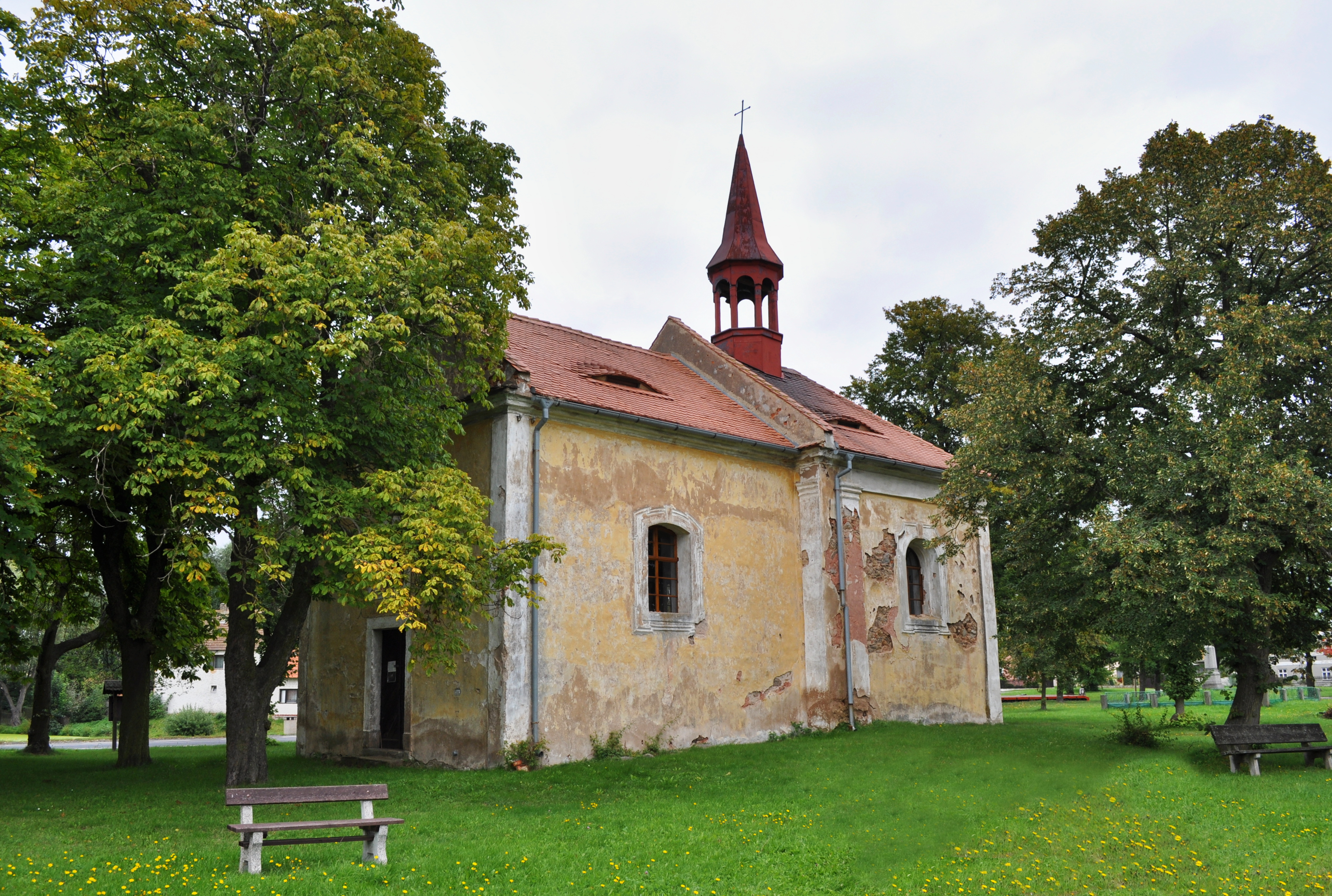
- Chapel of Saint Martin

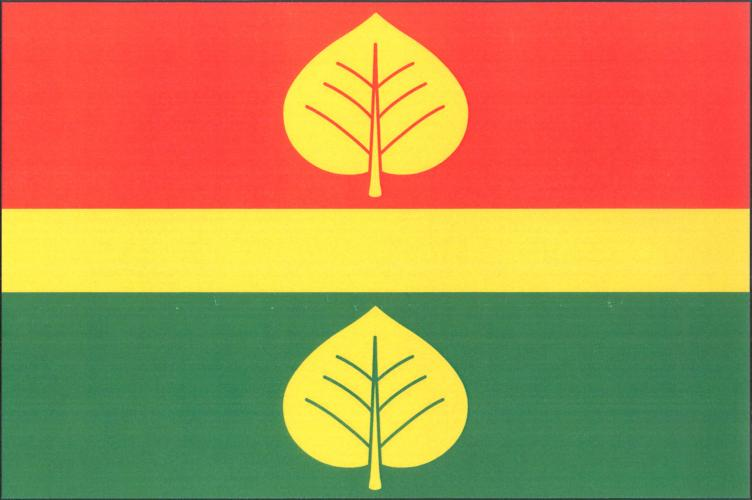
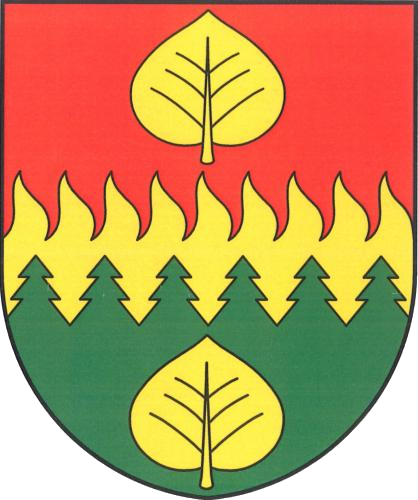
- Flag Coat of arms

- Location in the Czech Republic
- Coordinates: 50°3′31″N 13°27′35″E
- Country: Czech Republic
- Region: Central Bohemian
- District: Rakovník
- First mentioned: 1558

Area
  - Total: 8.66 km^{2} (3.34 sq mi)
- Elevation: 552 m (1,811 ft)

Population (2026-01-01)
  - Total: 130
  - Density: 15/km^{2} (39/sq mi)
- Time zone: UTC+1 (CET)
  - Summer (DST): UTC+2 (CEST)
- Postal code: 270 33
- Website: www.ouzdar.cz

Žďár is a municipality and village in Rakovník District in the Central Bohemian Region of the Czech Republic. It has about 100 inhabitants.

== Administrative division ==
Žďár consists of two municipal parts (in brackets population according to the 2021 census):

- Žďár (102)
- Otěvěky (32)

== Demographics ==
Historical population
Year	Pop.	±%
1869	423	—
1880	412	−2.6%
1890	387	−6.1%
1900	339	−12.4%
1910	341	+0.6%
1921	322	−5.6%
1930	332	+3.1%
1950	221	−33.4%
1961	188	−14.9%
1970	122	−35.1%
1980	137	+12.3%
1991	106	−22.6%
2001	90	−15.1%
2011	95	+5.6%
2021	134	+41.1%
Source: Censuses
