= Žďár nad Metují =

- Municipality
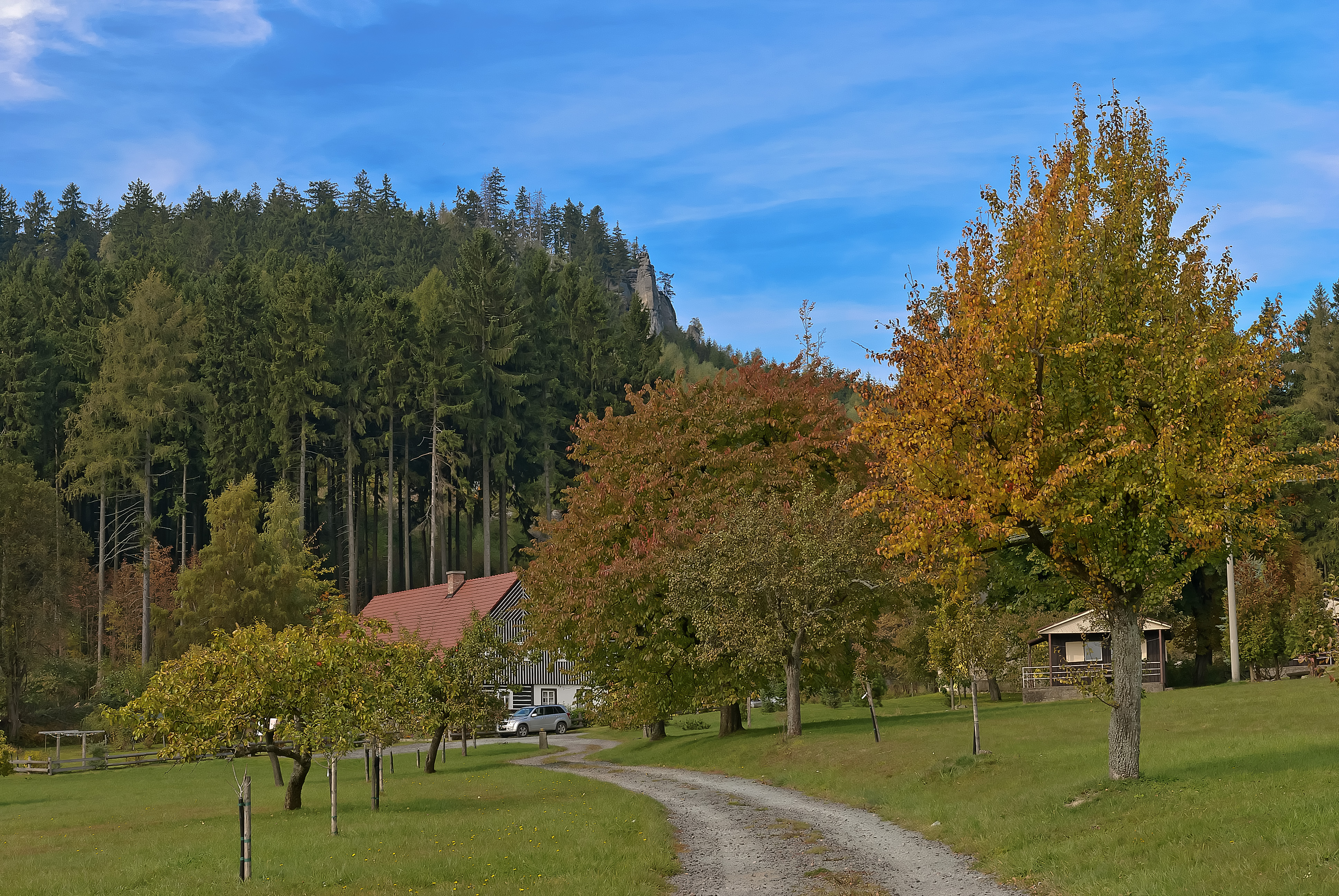
- Ostaš hamlet

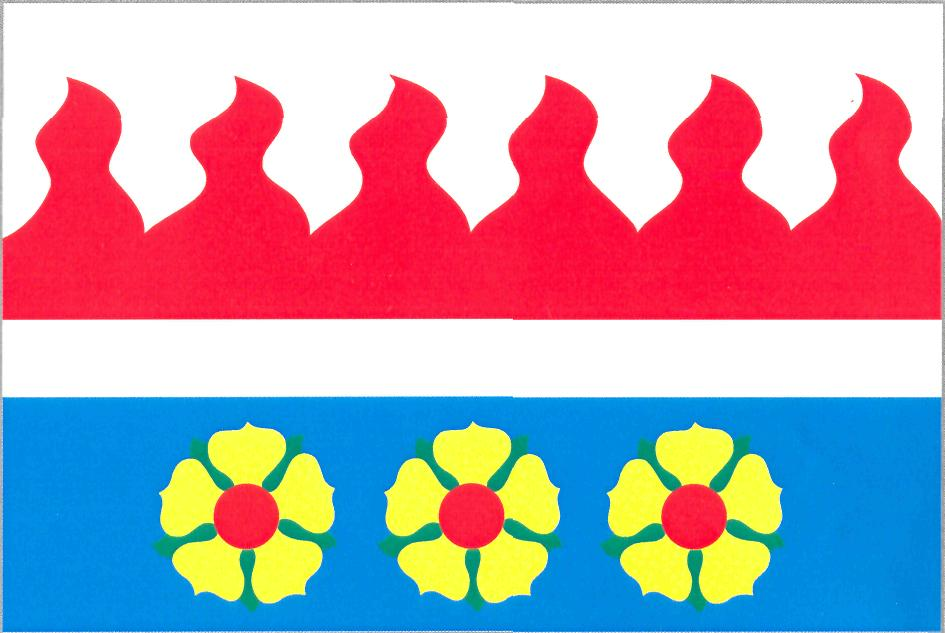
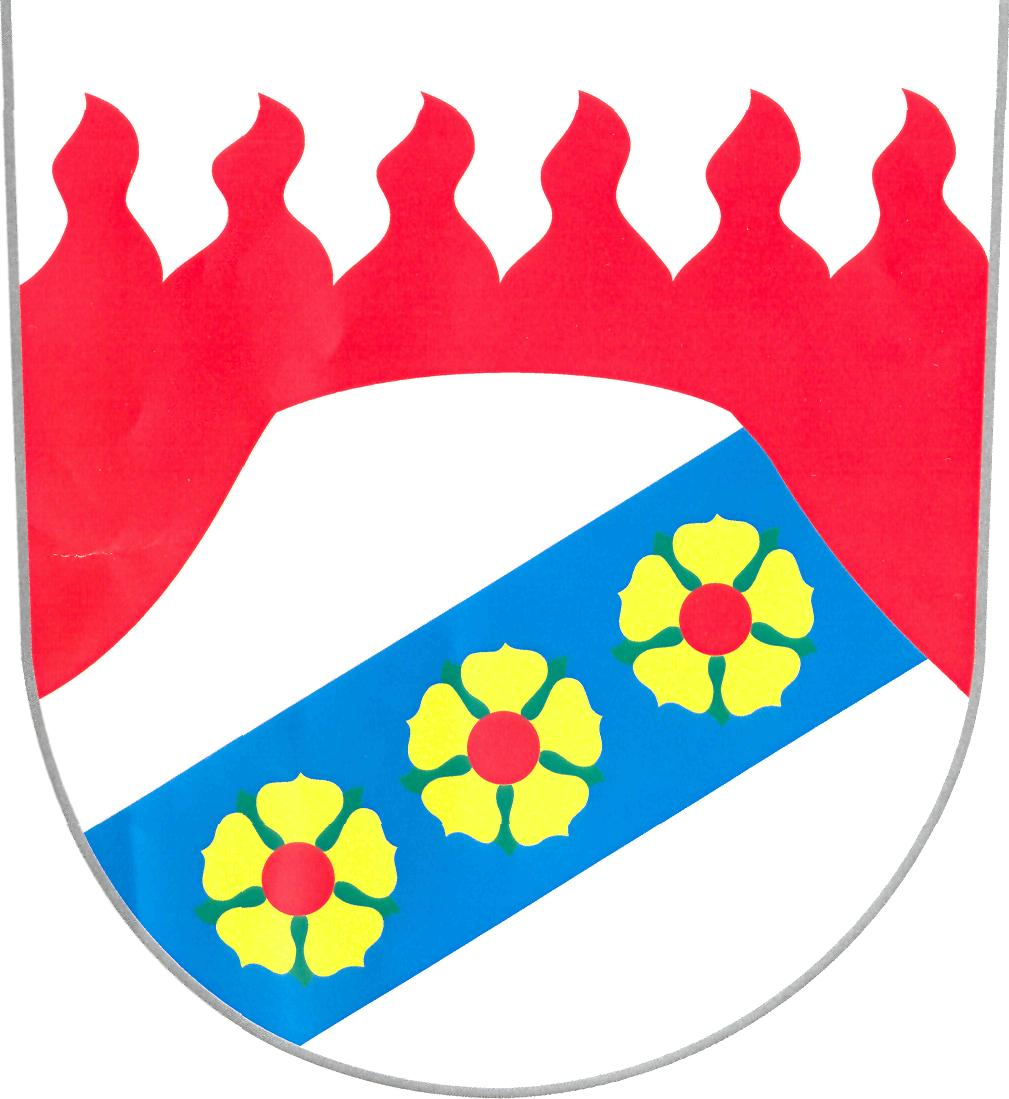
- Flag Coat of arms

- Location in the Czech Republic
- Coordinates: 50°32′20″N 16°12′48″E
- Country: Czech Republic
- Region: Hradec Králové
- District: Náchod
- First mentioned: 1406

Area
  - Total: 8.16 km^{2} (3.15 sq mi)
- Elevation: 441 m (1,447 ft)

Population (2026-01-01)
  - Total: 643
  - Density: 78.8/km^{2} (204/sq mi)
- Time zone: UTC+1 (CET)
  - Summer (DST): UTC+2 (CEST)
- Postal codes: 549 31, 549 34, 549 55
- Website: www.zdarnadmetuji.cz

Žďár nad Metují (German: Brand an der Mettau) is a municipality and village in Náchod District in the Hradec Králové Region of the Czech Republic. It has about 600 inhabitants.

== Demographics ==
Historical population
Year	Pop.	±%
1869	695	—
1880	752	+8.2%
1890	743	−1.2%
1900	694	−6.6%
1910	712	+2.6%
1921	632	−11.2%
1930	631	−0.2%
1950	471	−25.4%
1961	493	+4.7%
1970	493	+0.0%
1980	492	−0.2%
1991	454	−7.7%
2001	487	+7.3%
2011	634	+30.2%
2021	626	−1.3%
Source: Censuses
