= Chodský Újezd =

- Municipality
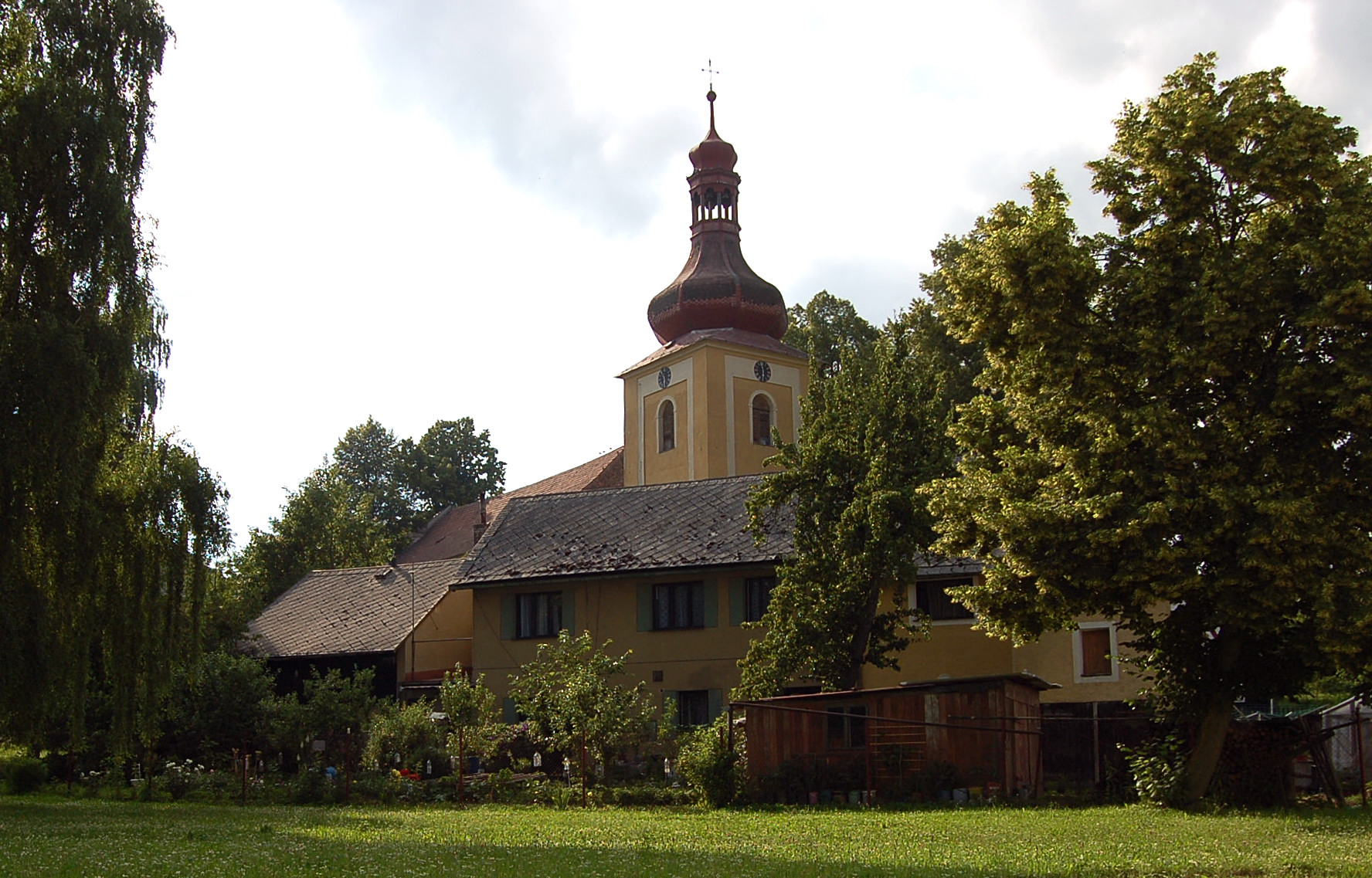
- Church of the Exaltation of the Holy Cross

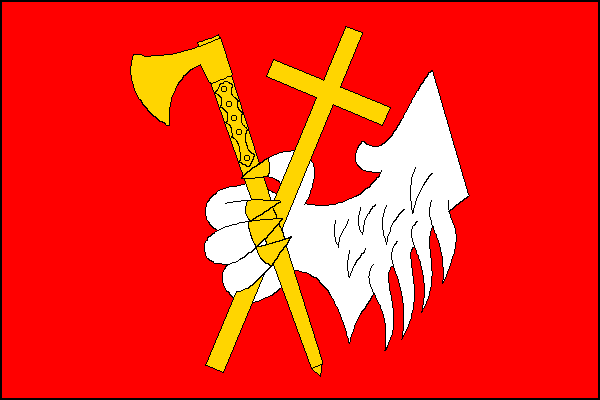
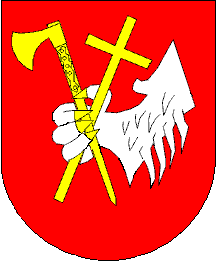
- Flag Coat of arms

- Location in the Czech Republic
- Coordinates: 49°51′52″N 12°39′0″E
- Country: Czech Republic
- Region: Plzeň
- District: Tachov
- First mentioned: 1359

Area
  - Total: 64.75 km^{2} (25.00 sq mi)
- Elevation: 556 m (1,824 ft)

Population (2026-01-01)
  - Total: 834
  - Density: 12.9/km^{2} (33.4/sq mi)
- Time zone: UTC+1 (CET)
  - Summer (DST): UTC+2 (CEST)
- Postal code: 348 15
- Website: www.chodskyujezd.eu

Chodský Újezd (German: Heiligenkreuz) is a municipality and village in Tachov District in the Plzeň Region of the Czech Republic. It has about 800 inhabitants.

Chodský Újezd lies approximately 8 kilometres (5 mi) north of Tachov, 56 km (35 mi) west of Plzeň, and 131 km (81 mi) west of Prague.

== Administrative division ==
Chodský Újezd consists of seven municipal parts (in brackets population according to the 2021 census):

- Chodský Újezd (383)
- Dolní Jadruž (57)
- Horní Jadruž (69)
- Nahý Újezdec (144)
- Neblažov (36)
- Štokov (36)
- Žďár (38)

== Demographics ==
Historical population
Year	Pop.	±%
1869	2,635	—
1880	2,859	+8.5%
1890	2,906	+1.6%
1900	2,851	−1.9%
1910	2,847	−0.1%
1921	2,846	−0.0%
1930	2,614	−8.2%
1950	1,169	−55.3%
1961	1,010	−13.6%
1970	883	−12.6%
1980	839	−5.0%
1991	753	−10.3%
2001	763	+1.3%
2011	723	−5.2%
2021	763	+5.5%
Source: Censuses
