= Žďár (Mladá Boleslav District) =

- Municipality
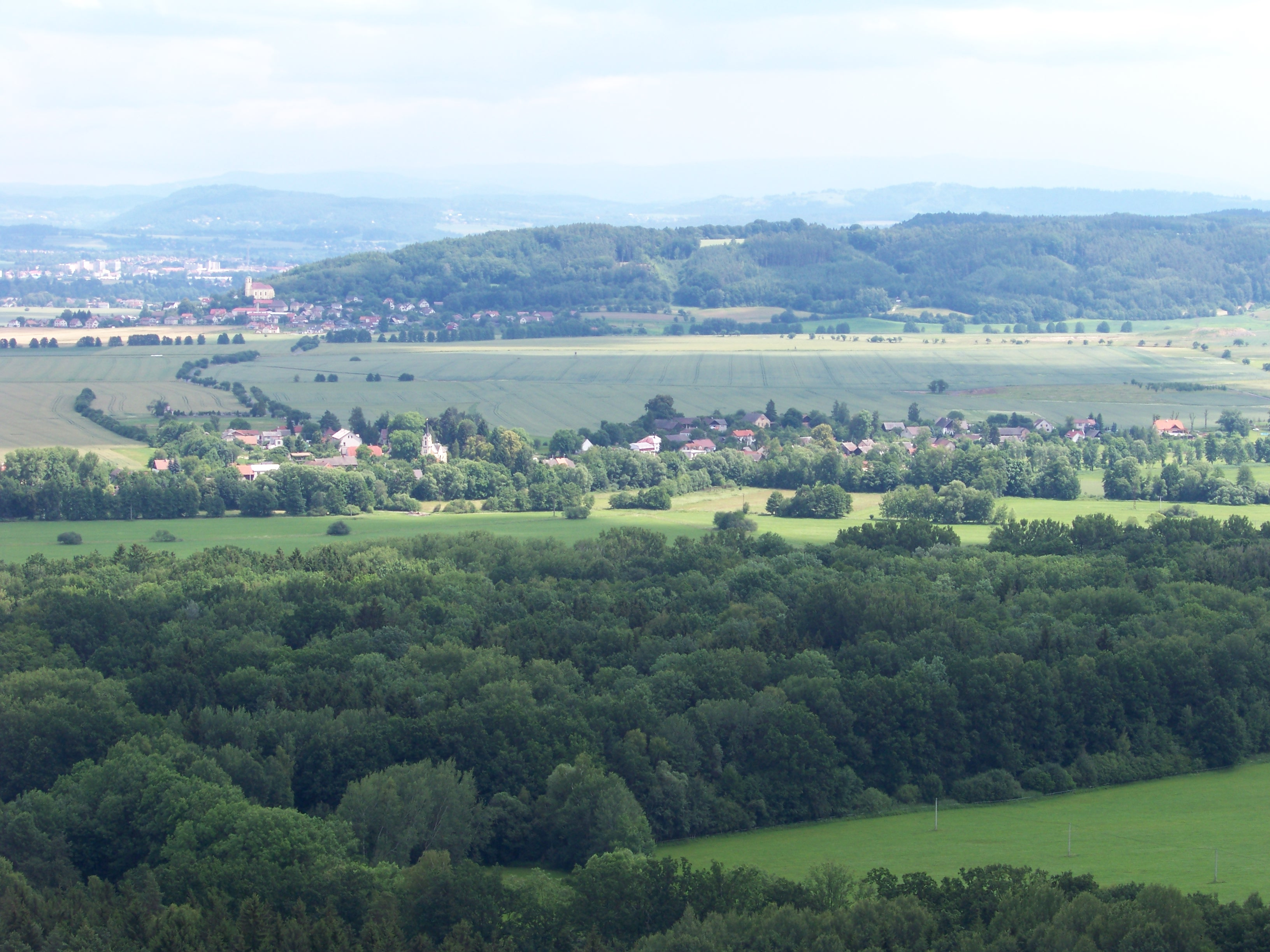
- View from the south

- Flag Coat of arms

- Location in the Czech Republic
- Coordinates: 50°32′37″N 15°4′50″E
- Country: Czech Republic
- Region: Central Bohemian
- District: Mladá Boleslav
- First mentioned: 1403

Area
  - Total: 14.81 km^{2} (5.72 sq mi)
- Elevation: 239 m (784 ft)

Population (2026-01-01)
  - Total: 1,501
  - Density: 101.4/km^{2} (262.5/sq mi)
- Time zone: UTC+1 (CET)
  - Summer (DST): UTC+2 (CEST)
- Postal codes: 294 11, 294 12
- Website: www.obec-zdar.eu

Žďár is a municipality and village in Mladá Boleslav District in the Central Bohemian Region of the Czech Republic. It has about 1,500 inhabitants.

== Administrative division ==
Žďár consists of six municipal parts (in brackets population according to the 2021 census):

- Žďár (278)
- Břehy (94)
- Doubrava (783)
- Příhrazy (29)
- Skokovy (87)
- Žehrov (189)

== Etymology ==
Žďár is a common Czech toponym. In the Middle Ages, the Old Czech word žďár denoted a place where the forest had been cleared and burned to make way for meadows and fields.

== Geography ==
Žďár is located about 18 kilometres (11 mi) northeast of Mladá Boleslav and 23 km (14 mi) south of Liberec. It lies in the Jičín Uplands. The highest point is at 375 m (1,230 ft) above sea level. Most of the municipal territory lies in the Bohemian Paradise Protected Landscape Area.

== History ==
The first written mention of Žďár is from 1403. Until 1547, the village was owned by the Vartenberk family as part of the Rohozec estate.

== Demographics ==
Historical population

Year	Pop.	±%
1869	1,296	—
1880	1,588	+22.5%
1890	1,569	−1.2%
1900	1,457	−7.1%
1910	1,533	+5.2%

Year	Pop.	±%
1921	1,499	−2.2%
1930	1,623	+8.3%
1950	1,434	−11.6%
1961	1,387	−3.3%
1970	1,324	−4.5%

Year	Pop.	±%
1980	1,243	−6.1%
1991	1,206	−3.0%
2001	1,162	−3.6%
2011	1,265	+8.9%
2021	1,460	+15.4%

Source: Censuses

== Transport ==
There are no railways or major roads passing through the municipality. However, the D1 motorway from Prague to Turnov and the railway line Mladá Boleslav–Turnov run along the northwestern municipal border just outside the municipality.

== Sights ==
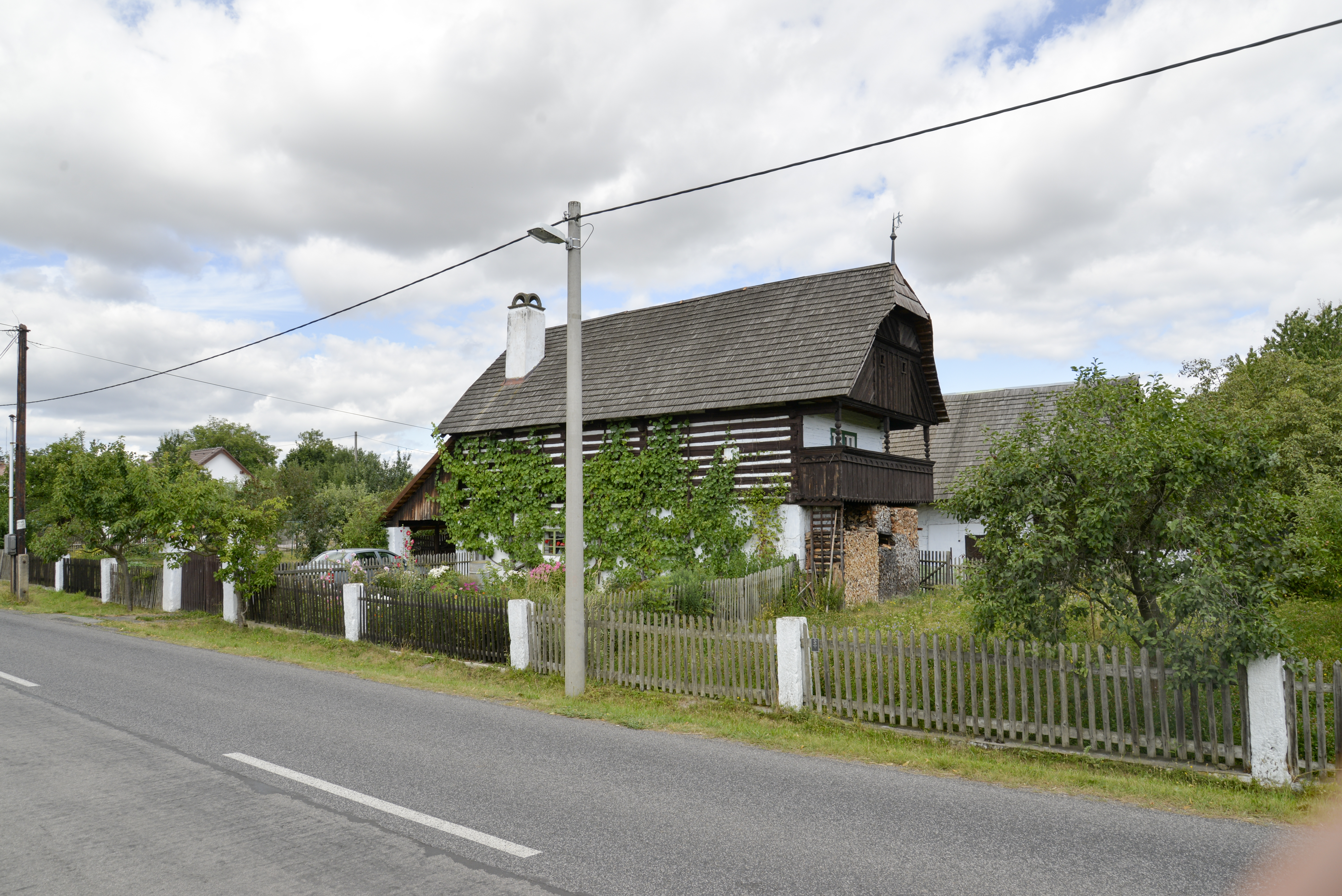
Former smithery

The main landmark of Žďár is the Chapel of the Visitation of the Virgin Mary. It was built in the neo-Gothic style in 1903–1904.

A valuable house is the former smithery, which is a timbered building with a brick ground floor from the first half of the 18th century.

In the woods near Žehrov is a hunting lodge from 1820 called Belvín or Bellevue. It is inaccessible to the public.
