= Veselý Žďár =

- Municipality
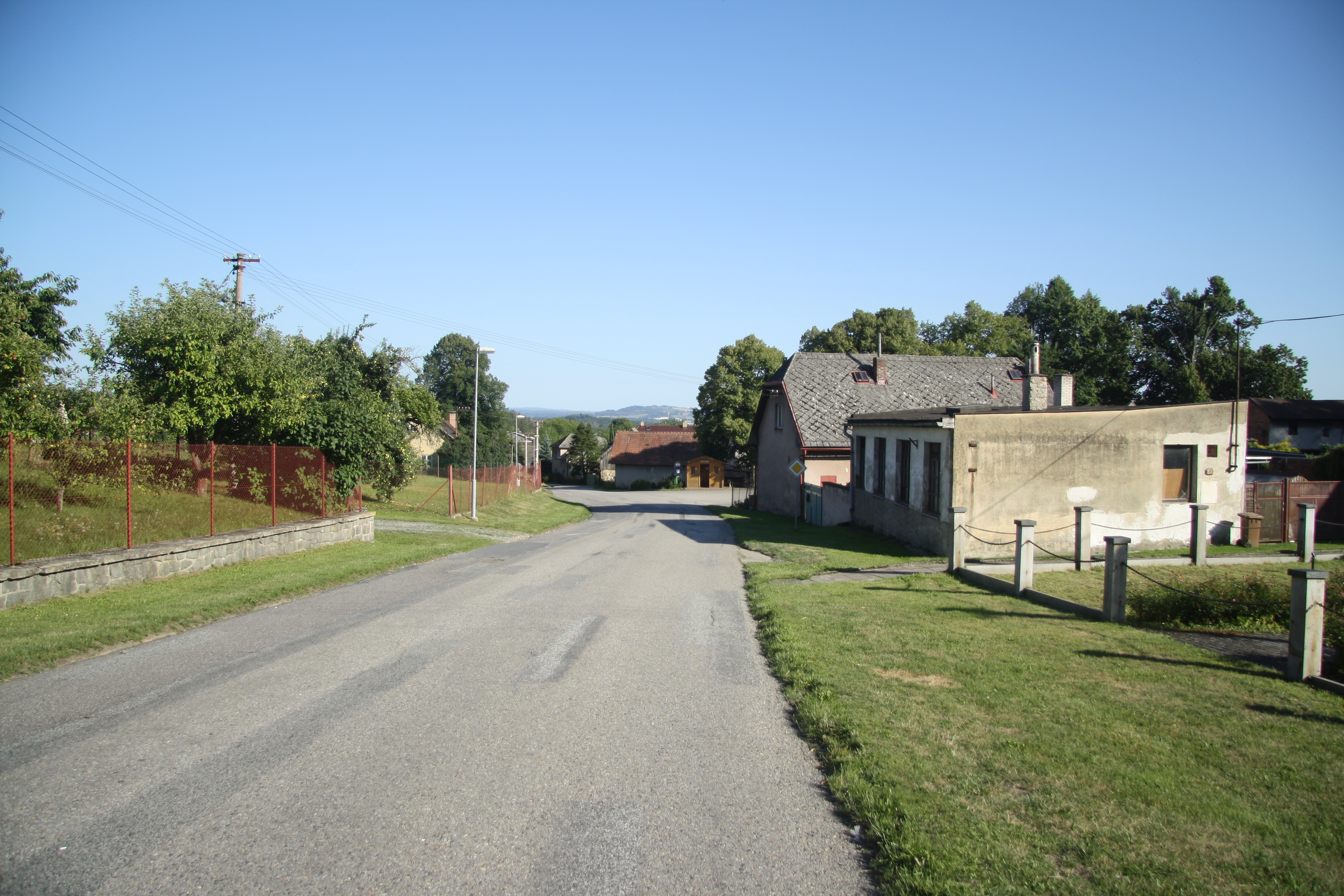
- Road through Veselý Žďár

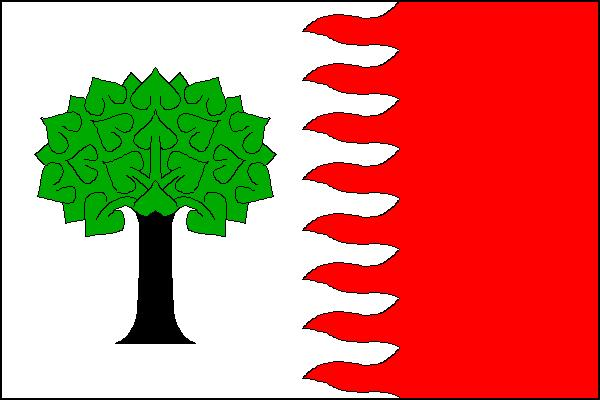
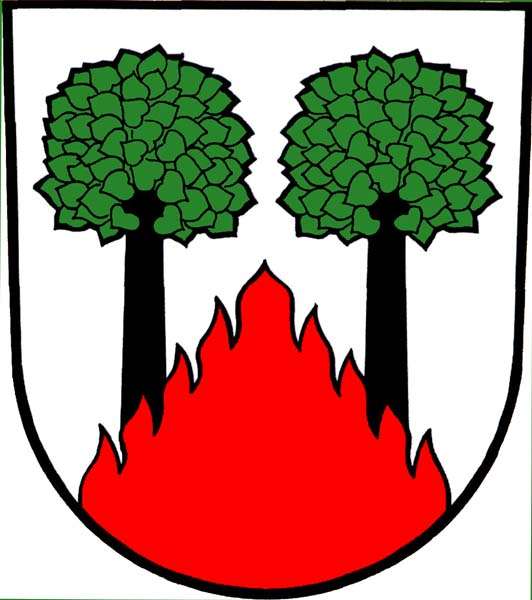
- Flag Coat of arms

- Location in the Czech Republic
- Coordinates: 49°38′23″N 15°31′34″E
- Country: Czech Republic
- Region: Vysočina
- District: Havlíčkův Brod
- First mentioned: 1379

Area
  - Total: 8.70 km^{2} (3.36 sq mi)
- Elevation: 491 m (1,611 ft)

Population (2026-01-01)
  - Total: 604
  - Density: 69.4/km^{2} (180/sq mi)
- Time zone: UTC+1 (CET)
  - Summer (DST): UTC+2 (CEST)
- Postal code: 580 01
- Website: www.veselyzdar.cz

Veselý Žďár is a municipality and village in Havlíčkův Brod District in the Vysočina Region of the Czech Republic. It has about 600 inhabitants.

Veselý Žďár lies approximately 6 kilometres (4 mi) north-west of Havlíčkův Brod, 28 km (17 mi) north of Jihlava, and 94 km (58 mi) south-east of Prague.

== Demographics ==
Historical population
Year	Pop.	±%
1869	582	—
1880	570	−2.1%
1890	555	−2.6%
1900	521	−6.1%
1910	594	+14.0%
1921	656	+10.4%
1930	640	−2.4%
1950	572	−10.6%
1961	564	−1.4%
1970	526	−6.7%
1980	510	−3.0%
1991	457	−10.4%
2001	470	+2.8%
2011	517	+10.0%
2021	580	+12.2%
Source: Censuses
