= Horní Lhota (Zlín District) =

- Municipality
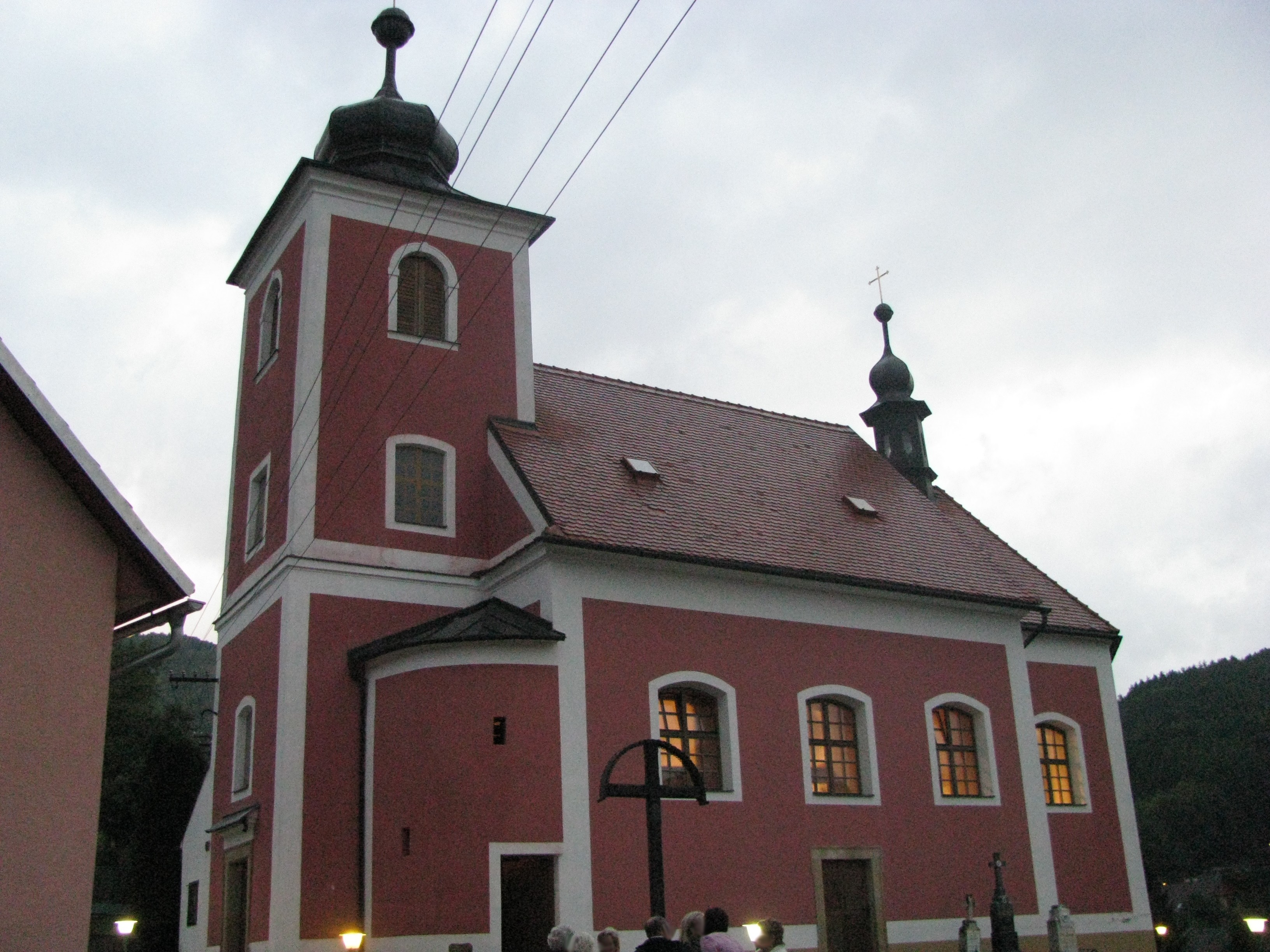
- Church of Saint Denis of Paris

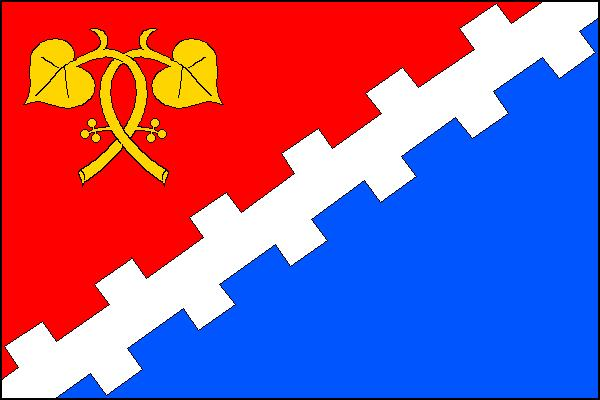
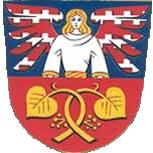
- Flag Coat of arms

- Location in the Czech Republic
- Coordinates: 49°9′16″N 17°48′16″E
- Country: Czech Republic
- Region: Zlín
- District: Zlín
- First mentioned: 1420

Area
  - Total: 12.65 km^{2} (4.88 sq mi)
- Elevation: 340 m (1,120 ft)

Population (2026-01-01)
  - Total: 608
  - Density: 48.1/km^{2} (124/sq mi)
- Time zone: UTC+1 (CET)
  - Summer (DST): UTC+2 (CEST)
- Postal code: 763 23
- Website: www.horni-lhota.cz

Horní Lhota is a municipality and village in Zlín District in the Zlín Region of the Czech Republic. It has about 600 inhabitants.

Horní Lhota lies approximately 14 kilometres (9 mi) south-east of Zlín and 265 km (165 mi) south-east of Prague.

== Demographics ==
Historical population
Year	Pop.	±%
1869	387	—
1880	379	−2.1%
1890	378	−0.3%
1900	381	+0.8%
1910	418	+9.7%
1921	441	+5.5%
1930	431	−2.3%
1950	441	+2.3%
1961	506	+14.7%
1970	520	+2.8%
1980	496	−4.6%
1991	500	+0.8%
2001	530	+6.0%
2011	552	+4.2%
2021	565	+2.4%
Source: Censuses
