= Žďár (Blansko District) =

- Municipality
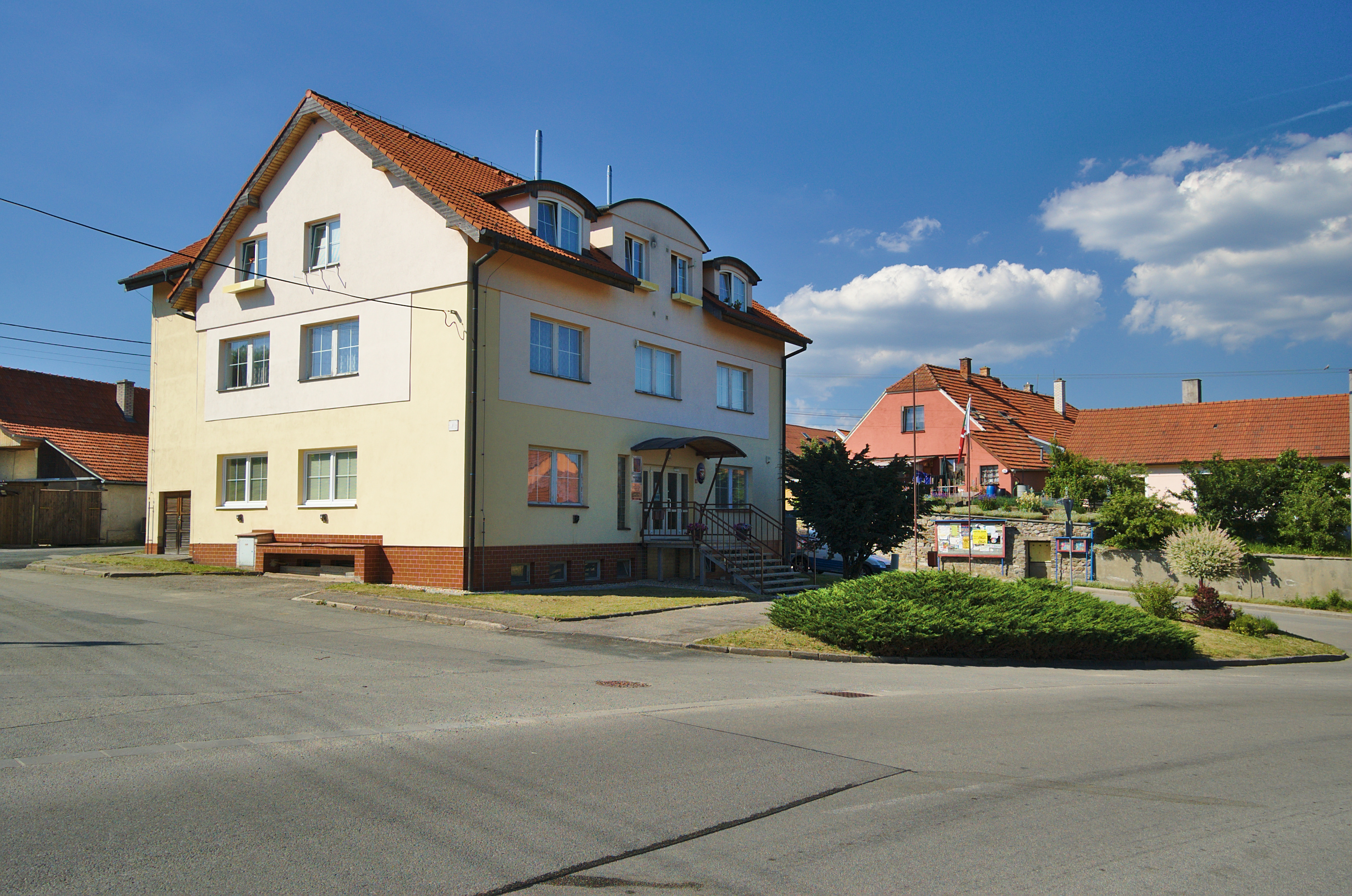
- Municipal office

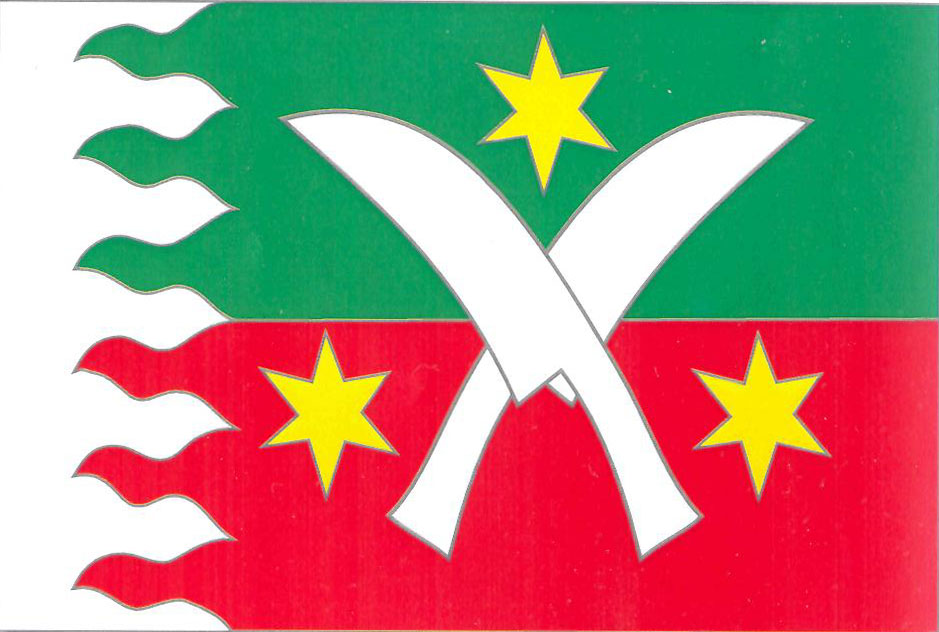
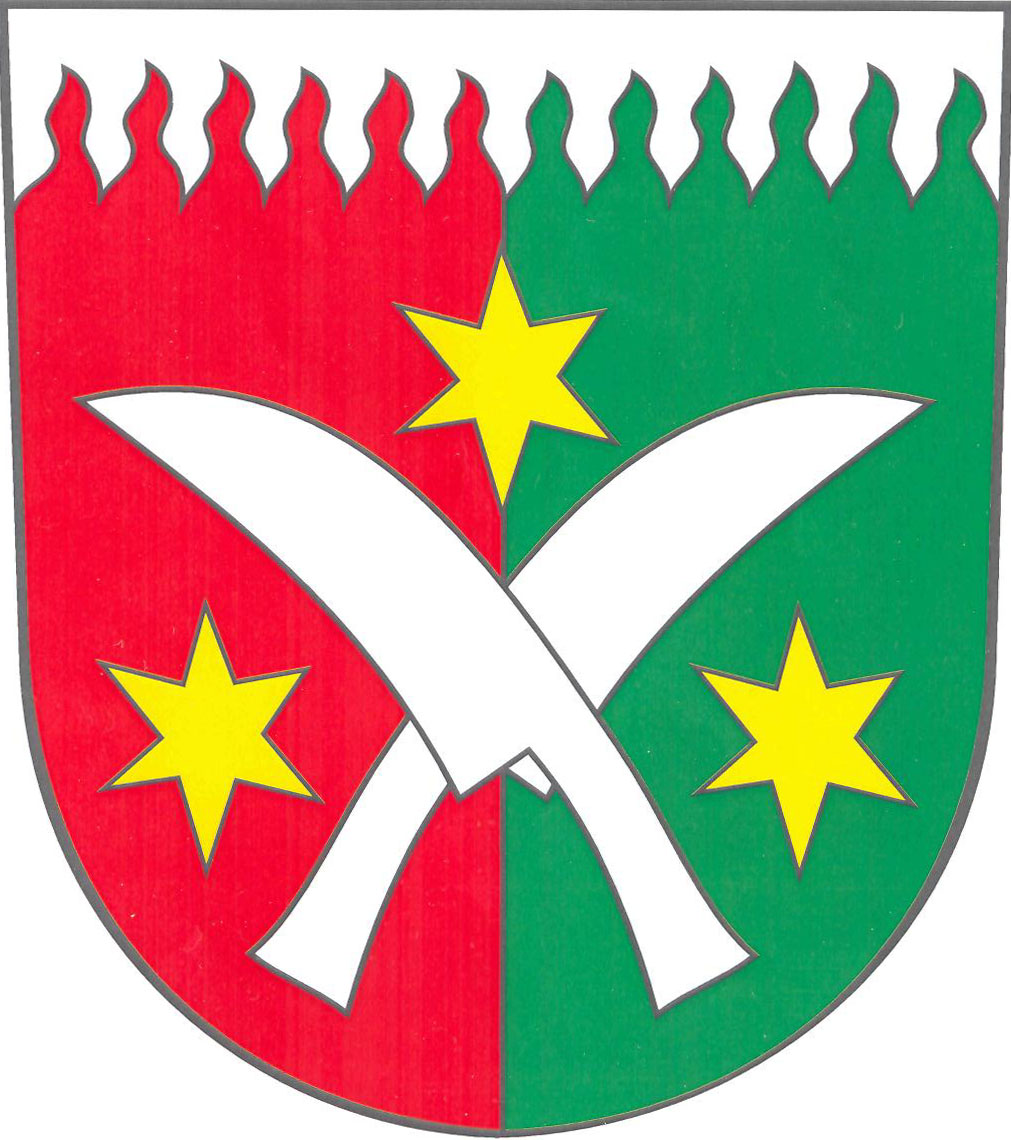
- Flag Coat of arms

- Location in the Czech Republic
- Coordinates: 49°25′18″N 16°41′52″E
- Country: Czech Republic
- Region: South Moravian
- District: Blansko
- First mentioned: 1371

Area
  - Total: 5.09 km^{2} (1.97 sq mi)
- Elevation: 565 m (1,854 ft)

Population (2026-01-01)
  - Total: 394
  - Density: 77.4/km^{2} (200/sq mi)
- Time zone: UTC+1 (CET)
  - Summer (DST): UTC+2 (CEST)
- Postal code: 679 02
- Website: ou-zdar.cz

Žďár is a municipality and village in Blansko District in the South Moravian Region of the Czech Republic. It has about 400 inhabitants.

Žďár lies approximately 8 kilometres (5 mi) north-east of Blansko, 26 km (16 mi) north of Brno, and 181 km (112 mi) south-east of Prague.

== Demographics ==
Historical population
Year	Pop.	±%
1869	532	—
1880	541	+1.7%
1890	539	−0.4%
1900	626	+16.1%
1910	609	−2.7%
1921	574	−5.7%
1930	552	−3.8%
1950	439	−20.5%
1961	422	−3.9%
1970	415	−1.7%
1980	398	−4.1%
1991	363	−8.8%
2001	359	−1.1%
2011	365	+1.7%
2021	382	+4.7%
Source: Censuses
