= Slavětín (Havlíčkův Brod District) =

- Municipality
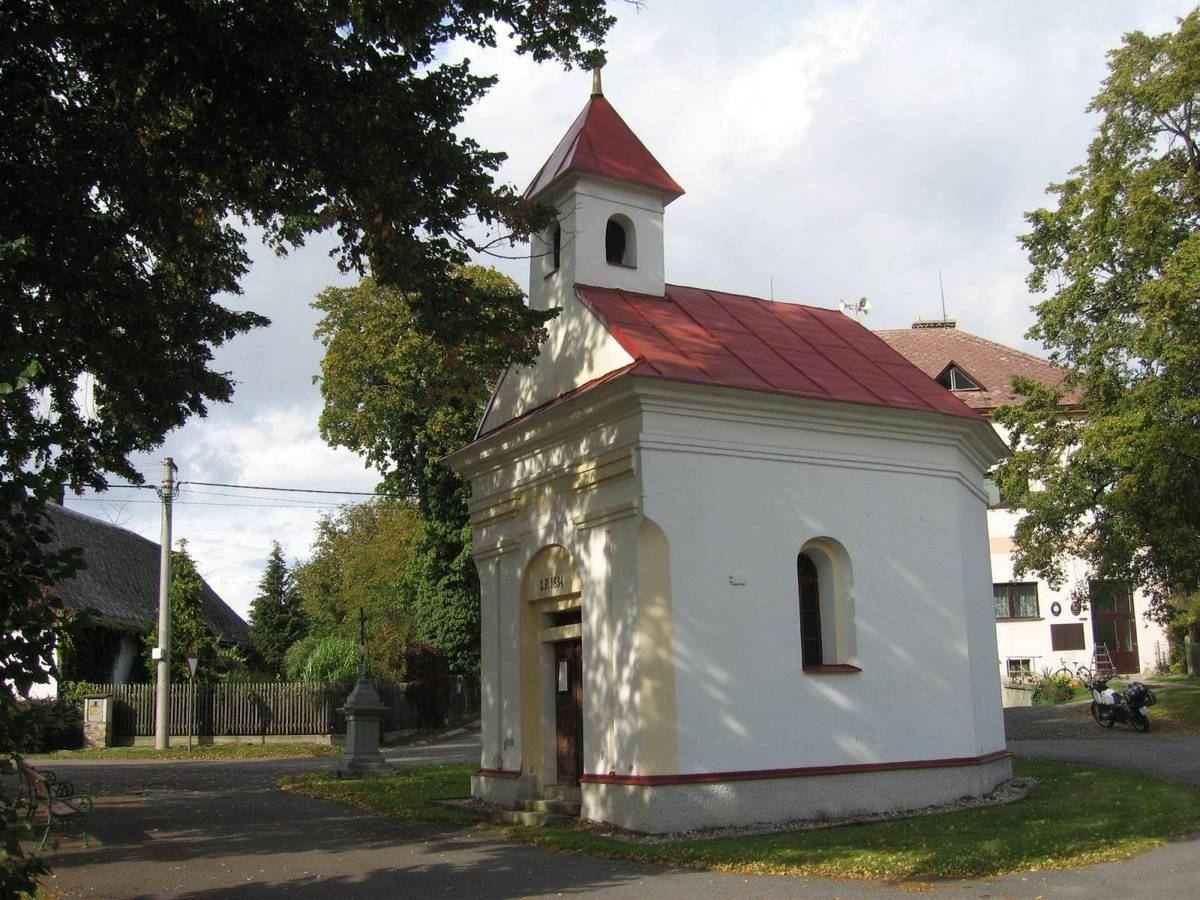
- Chapel of Saint Anne

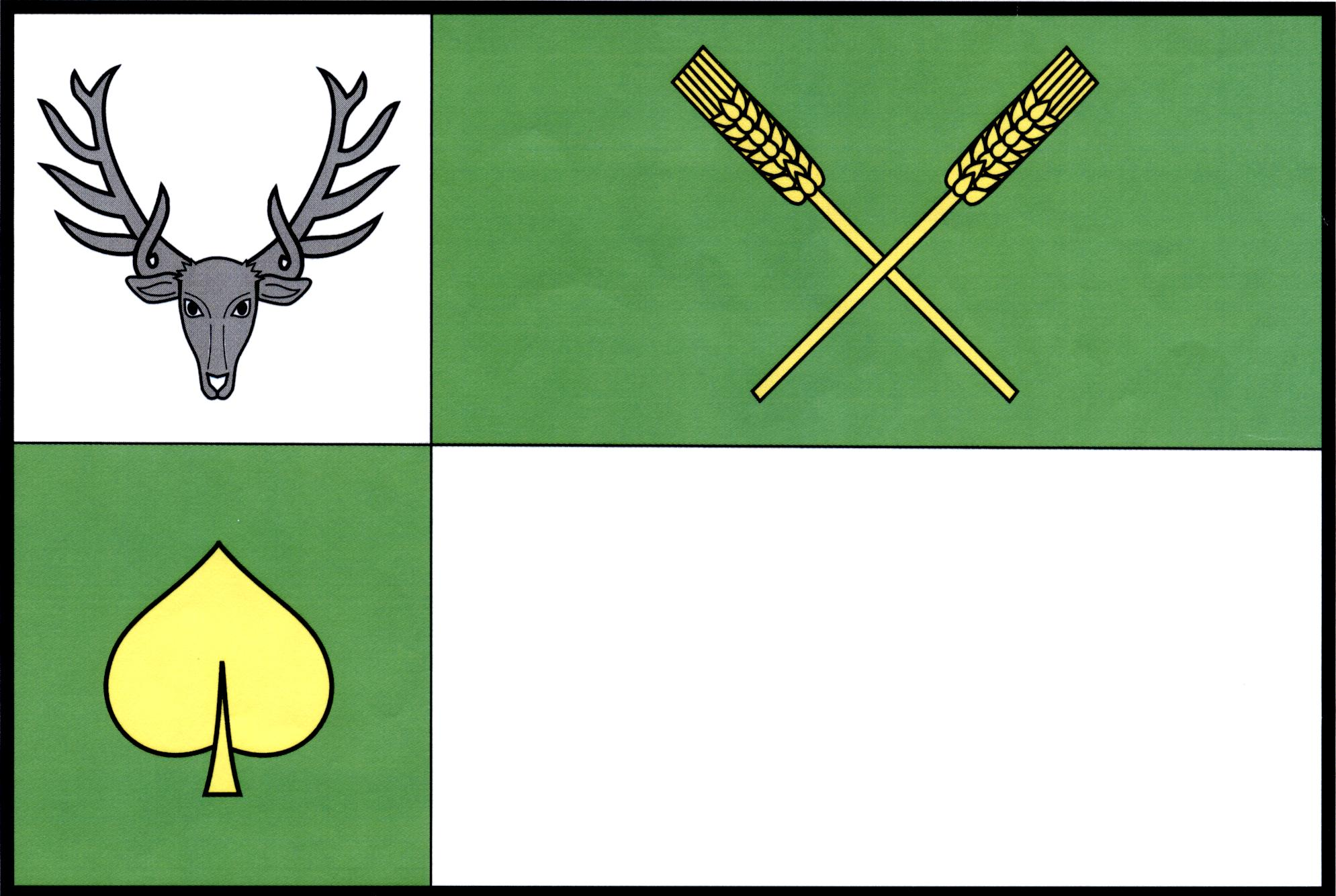
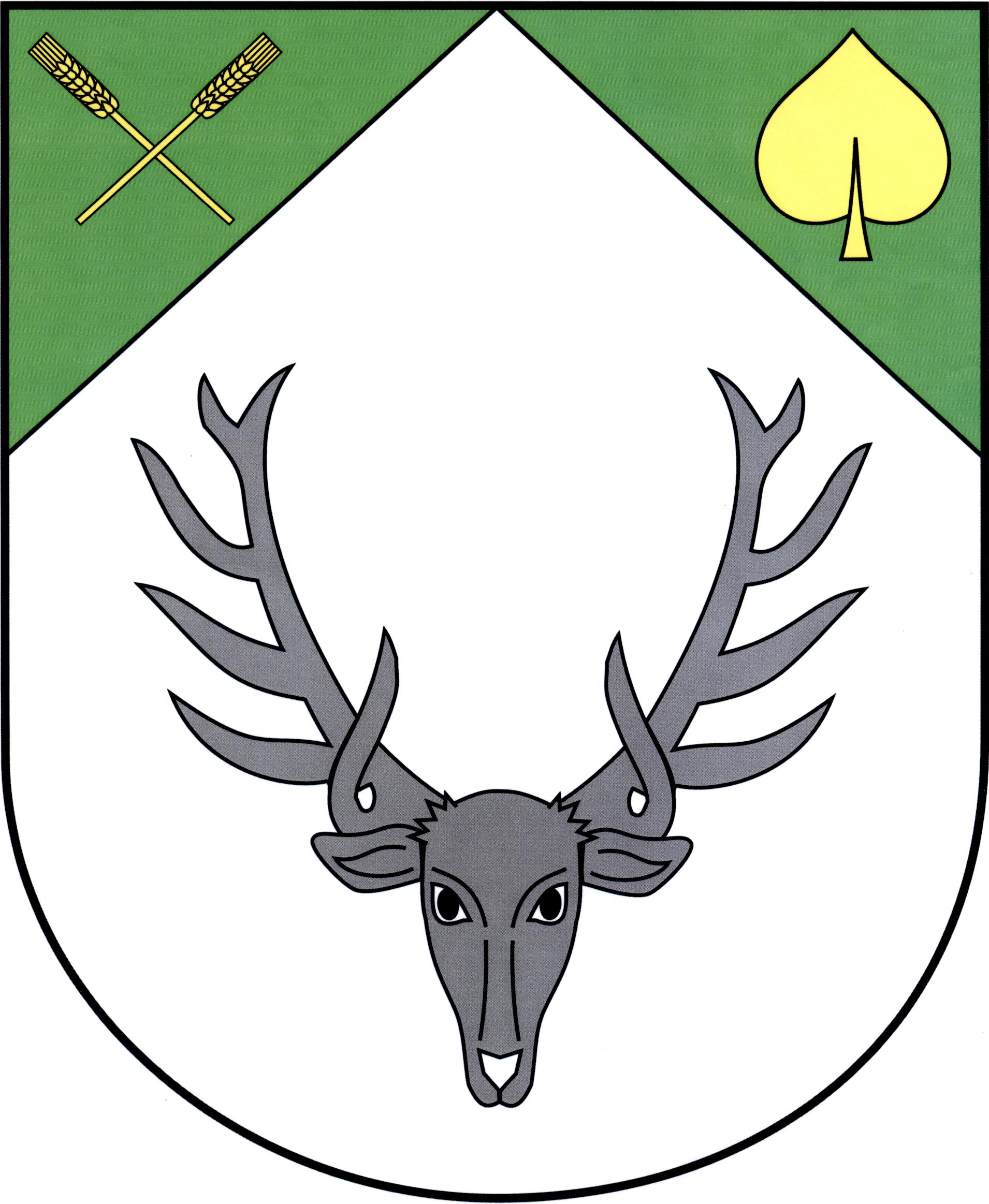
- Flag Coat of arms

- Location in the Czech Republic
- Coordinates: 49°40′7″N 15°46′22″E
- Country: Czech Republic
- Region: Vysočina
- District: Havlíčkův Brod
- First mentioned: 1314

Area
  - Total: 2.19 km^{2} (0.85 sq mi)
- Elevation: 579 m (1,900 ft)

Population (2026-01-01)
  - Total: 132
  - Density: 60.3/km^{2} (156/sq mi)
- Time zone: UTC+1 (CET)
  - Summer (DST): UTC+2 (CEST)
- Postal code: 582 63
- Website: obecslavetin.estranky.cz

Slavětín is a municipality and village in Havlíčkův Brod District in the Vysočina Region of the Czech Republic. It has about 100 inhabitants.

Slavětín lies approximately 16 kilometres (10 mi) north-east of Havlíčkův Brod, 34 km (21 mi) north-east of Jihlava, and 108 km (67 mi) south-east of Prague.

== Demographics ==
Historical population
Year	Pop.	±%
1869	272	—
1880	240	−11.8%
1890	244	+1.7%
1900	265	+8.6%
1910	277	+4.5%
1921	276	−0.4%
1930	250	−9.4%
1950	208	−16.8%
1961	204	−1.9%
1970	189	−7.4%
1980	137	−27.5%
1991	97	−29.2%
2001	95	−2.1%
2011	104	+9.5%
2021	113	+8.7%
Source: Censuses
