= Slavětín nad Metují =

- Municipality
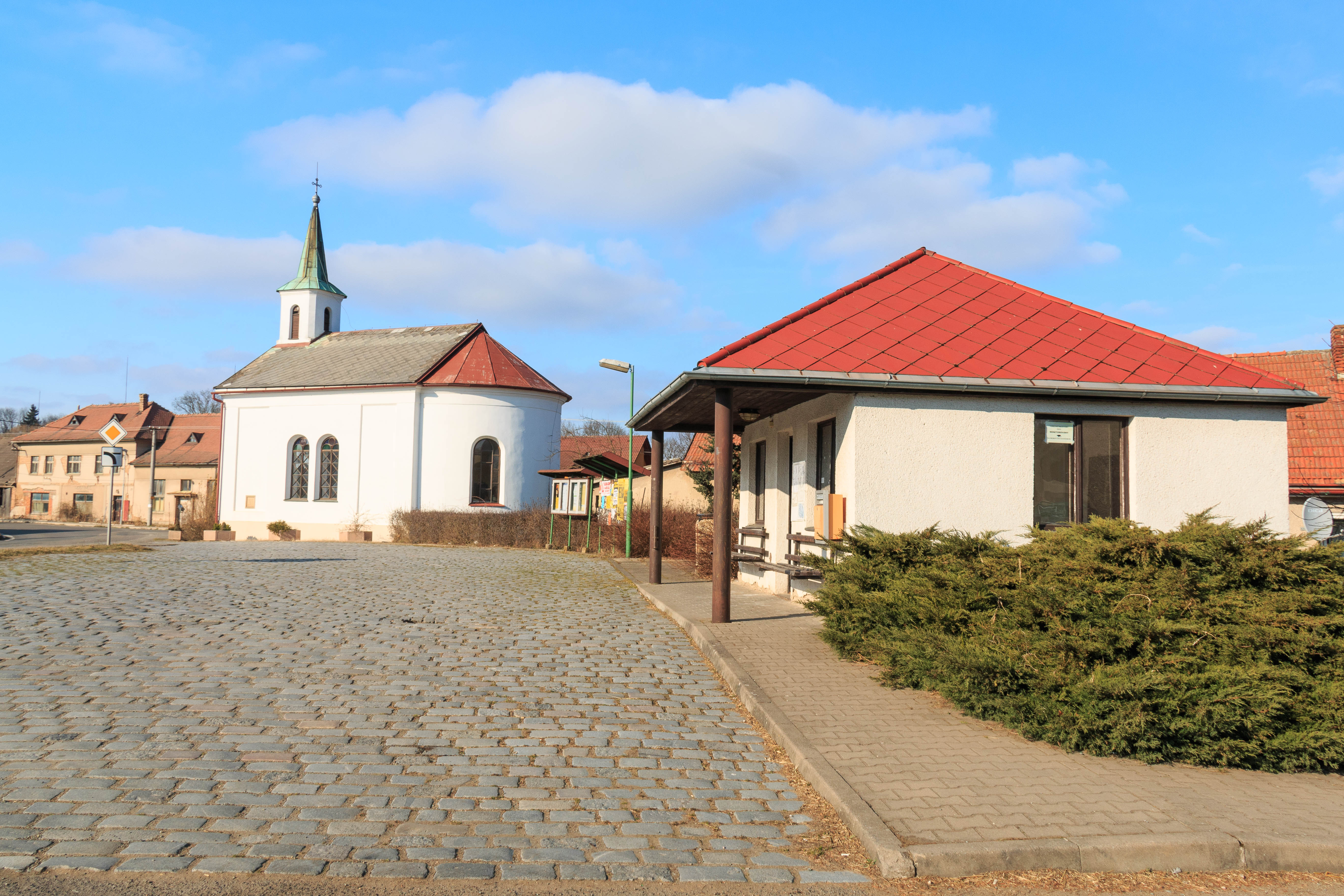
- Chapel of the Visitation of the Virgin Mary

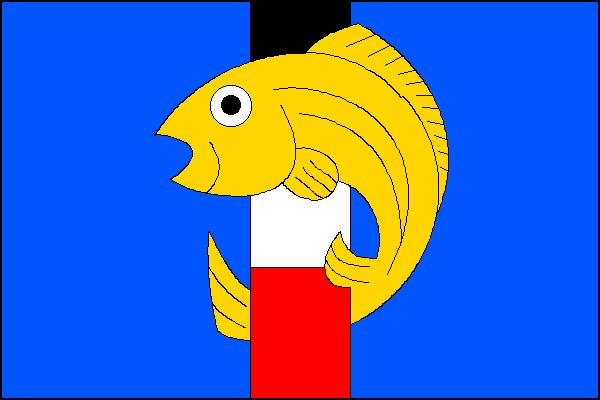
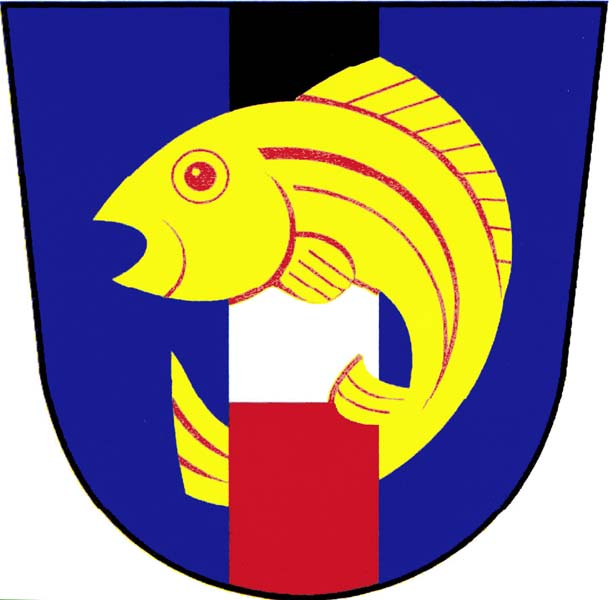
- Flag Coat of arms

- Location in the Czech Republic
- Coordinates: 50°19′44″N 16°3′11″E
- Country: Czech Republic
- Region: Hradec Králové
- District: Náchod
- First mentioned: 1495

Area
  - Total: 5.55 km^{2} (2.14 sq mi)
- Elevation: 268 m (879 ft)

Population (2026-01-01)
  - Total: 254
  - Density: 45.8/km^{2} (119/sq mi)
- Time zone: UTC+1 (CET)
  - Summer (DST): UTC+2 (CEST)
- Postal code: 549 01
- Website: www.slavetinnadmetuji.cz

Slavětín nad Metují is a municipality and village in Náchod District in the Hradec Králové Region of the Czech Republic. It has about 300 inhabitants. It lies on the Metuje River.

== Demographics ==
Historical population
Year	Pop.	±%
1869	490	—
1880	501	+2.2%
1890	515	+2.8%
1900	466	−9.5%
1910	458	−1.7%
1921	463	+1.1%
1930	409	−11.7%
1950	312	−23.7%
1961	278	−10.9%
1970	268	−3.6%
1980	276	+3.0%
1991	243	−12.0%
2001	230	−5.3%
2011	248	+7.8%
2021	257	+3.6%
Source: Censuses
