= Týnec (Klatovy District) =

- Municipality
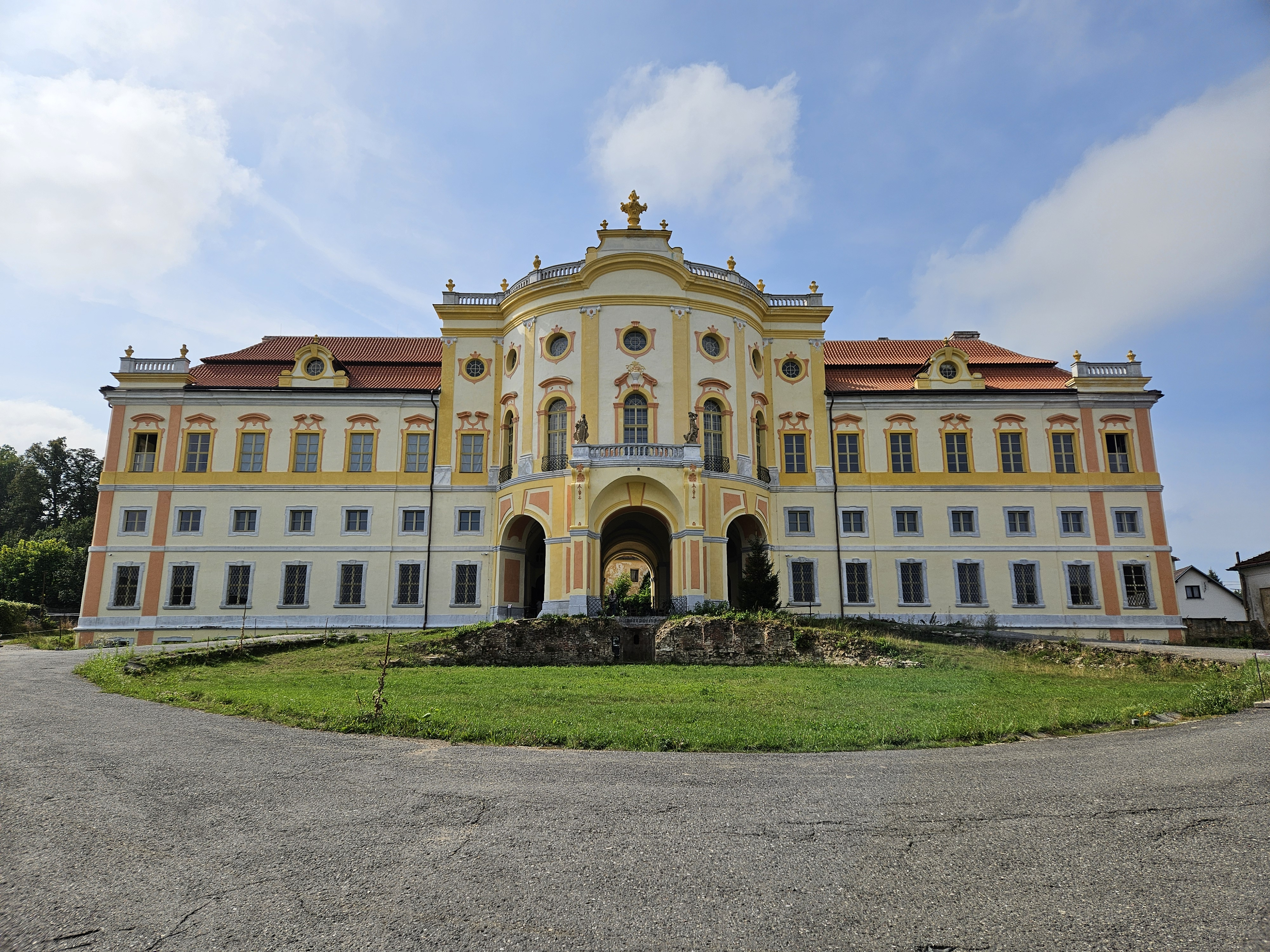
- Týnec Castle

- Flag Coat of arms

- Location in the Czech Republic
- Coordinates: 49°20′15″N 13°29′26″E
- Country: Czech Republic
- Region: Plzeň
- District: Klatovy
- First mentioned: 1227

Area
  - Total: 7.48 km^{2} (2.89 sq mi)
- Elevation: 507 m (1,663 ft)

Population (2026-01-01)
  - Total: 365
  - Density: 48.8/km^{2} (126/sq mi)
- Time zone: UTC+1 (CET)
  - Summer (DST): UTC+2 (CEST)
- Postal codes: 340 21
- Website: www.sumavanet.cz/tynec/

Týnec is a municipality and village in Klatovy District in the Plzeň Region of the Czech Republic. It has about 400 inhabitants.

Týnec lies approximately 6 kilometres (4 mi) south of Klatovy, 46 km (29 mi) south of Plzeň, and 117 km (73 mi) south-west of Prague.

== Administrative division ==
Týnec consists of four municipal parts (in brackets population according to the 2021 census):

- Týnec (247)
- Horní Lhota (39)
- Loreta (32)
- Rozpáralka (11)

== Demographics ==
Historical population
Year	Pop.	±%
1869	634	—
1880	712	+12.3%
1890	643	−9.7%
1900	647	+0.6%
1910	689	+6.5%
1921	721	+4.6%
1930	596	−17.3%
1950	457	−23.3%
1961	489	+7.0%
1970	454	−7.2%
1980	374	−17.6%
1991	310	−17.1%
2001	308	−0.6%
2011	304	−1.3%
2021	329	+8.2%
Source: Censuses
