= Žďárná =

- Municipality
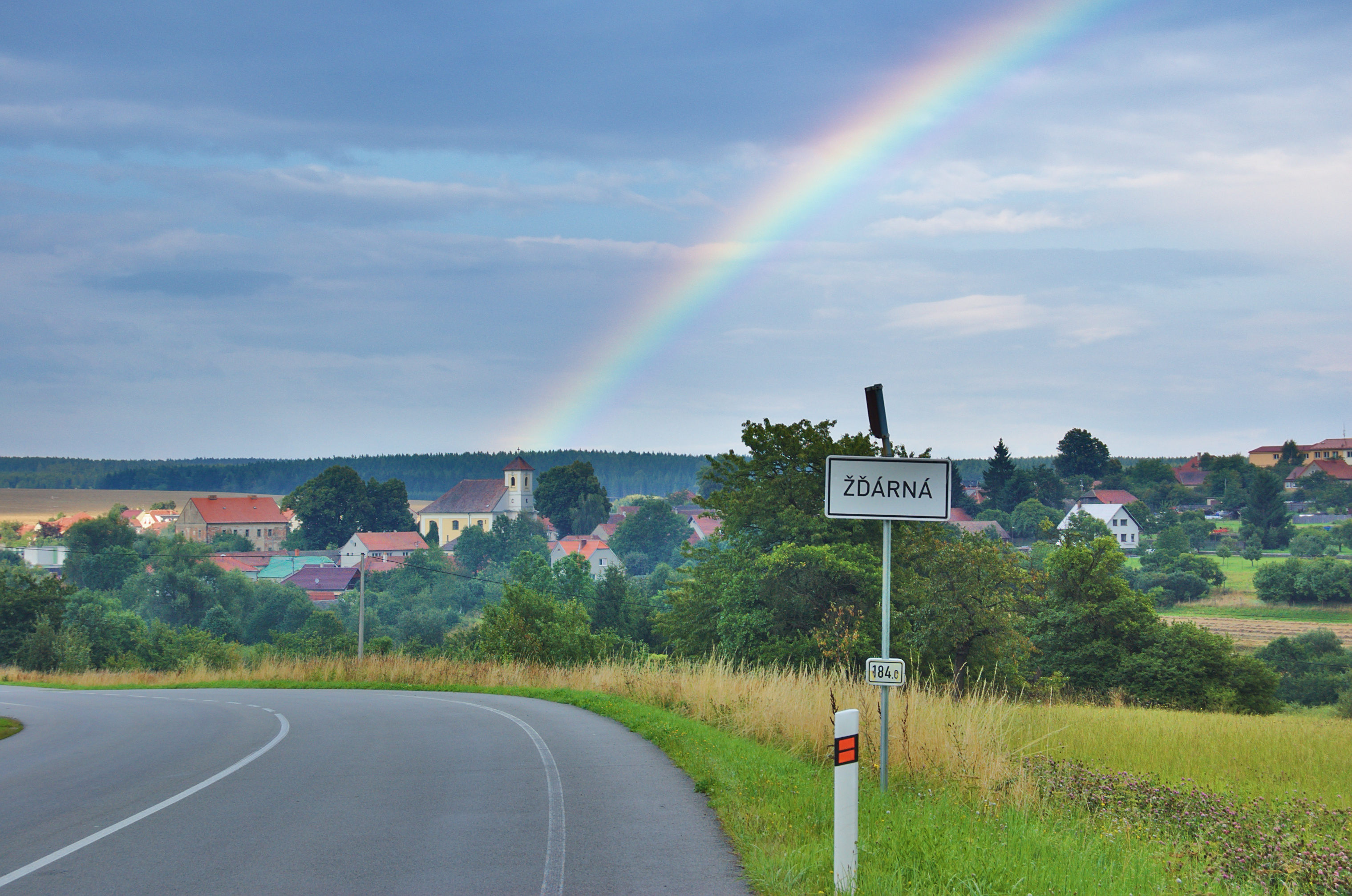
- General view

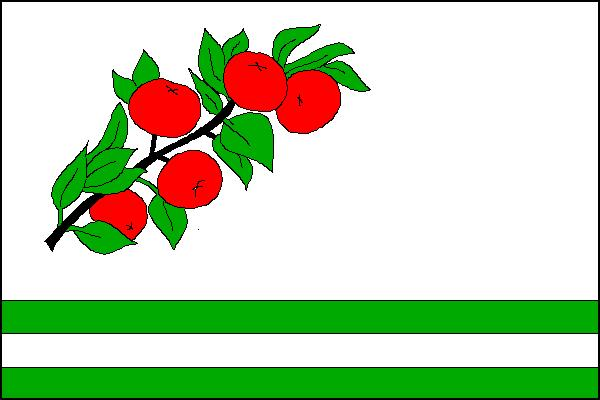
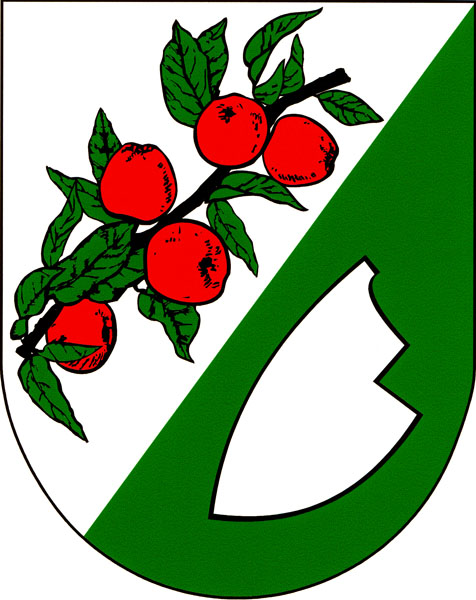
- Flag Coat of arms

- Location in the Czech Republic
- Coordinates: 49°28′7″N 16°45′31″E
- Country: Czech Republic
- Region: South Moravian
- District: Blansko
- First mentioned: 1418

Area
  - Total: 10.36 km^{2} (4.00 sq mi)
- Elevation: 638 m (2,093 ft)

Population (2026-01-01)
  - Total: 828
  - Density: 79.9/km^{2} (207/sq mi)
- Time zone: UTC+1 (CET)
  - Summer (DST): UTC+2 (CEST)
- Postal code: 679 52
- Website: www.zdarna.eu

Žďárná is a municipality and village in Blansko District in the South Moravian Region of the Czech Republic. It has about 800 inhabitants.

Žďárná lies approximately 15 kilometres (9 mi) north-east of Blansko, 32 kilometres (20 mi) north of Brno, and 183 kilometres (114 mi) east of Prague.

== Demographics ==
Historical population
Year	Pop.	±%
1869	829	—
1880	892	+7.6%
1890	1,014	+13.7%
1900	1,004	−1.0%
1910	1,031	+2.7%
1921	1,040	+0.9%
1930	1,002	−3.7%
1950	953	−4.9%
1961	976	+2.4%
1970	906	−7.2%
1980	764	−15.7%
1991	730	−4.5%
2001	699	−4.2%
2011	751	+7.4%
2021	746	−0.7%
Source: Censuses
