= Dolní Žďár =

- Municipality
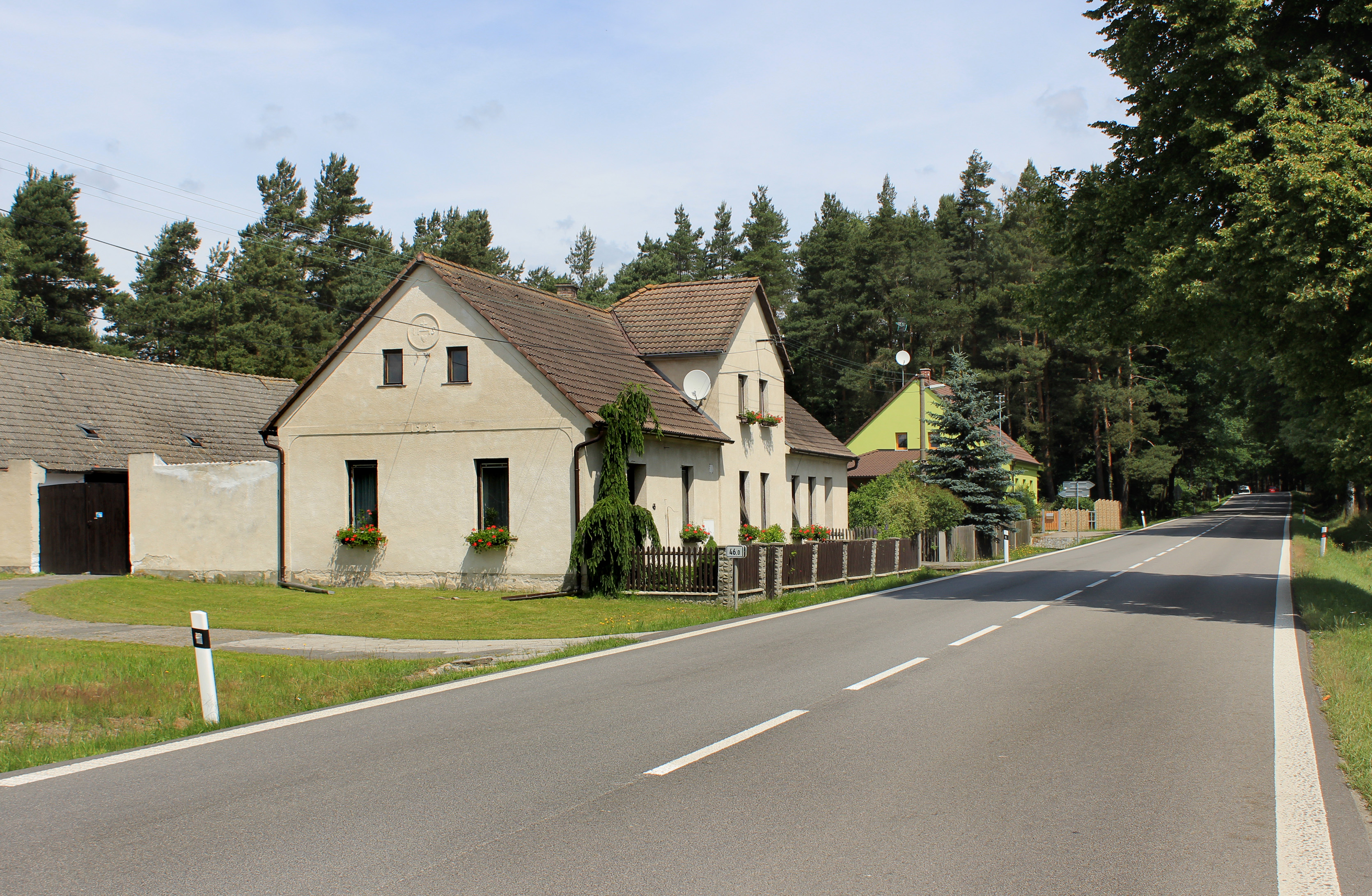
- Main road

- Location in the Czech Republic
- Coordinates: 49°6′4″N 14°59′17″E
- Country: Czech Republic
- Region: South Bohemian
- District: Jindřichův Hradec
- First mentioned: 1211

Area
  - Total: 6.84 km^{2} (2.64 sq mi)
- Elevation: 455 m (1,493 ft)

Population (2026-01-01)
  - Total: 164
  - Density: 24.0/km^{2} (62.1/sq mi)
- Time zone: UTC+1 (CET)
  - Summer (DST): UTC+2 (CEST)
- Postal code: 378 02
- Website: www.dolnizdar.cz

Dolní Žďár (German: Niedermühl) is a municipality and village in Jindřichův Hradec District in the South Bohemian Region of the Czech Republic. It has about 200 inhabitants.

== Administrative division ==
Dolní Žďár consists of two municipal parts (in brackets population according to the 2021 census):

- Dolní Žďár (82)
- Horní Lhota (68)

== Demographics ==
Historical population
Year	Pop.	±%
1869	514	—
1880	462	−10.1%
1890	446	−3.5%
1900	426	−4.5%
1910	395	−7.3%
1921	391	−1.0%
1930	382	−2.3%
1950	291	−23.8%
1961	277	−4.8%
1970	182	−34.3%
1980	151	−17.0%
1991	108	−28.5%
2001	109	+0.9%
2011	155	+42.2%
2021	150	−3.2%
Source: Censuses
