= Načeradec =

- Market town
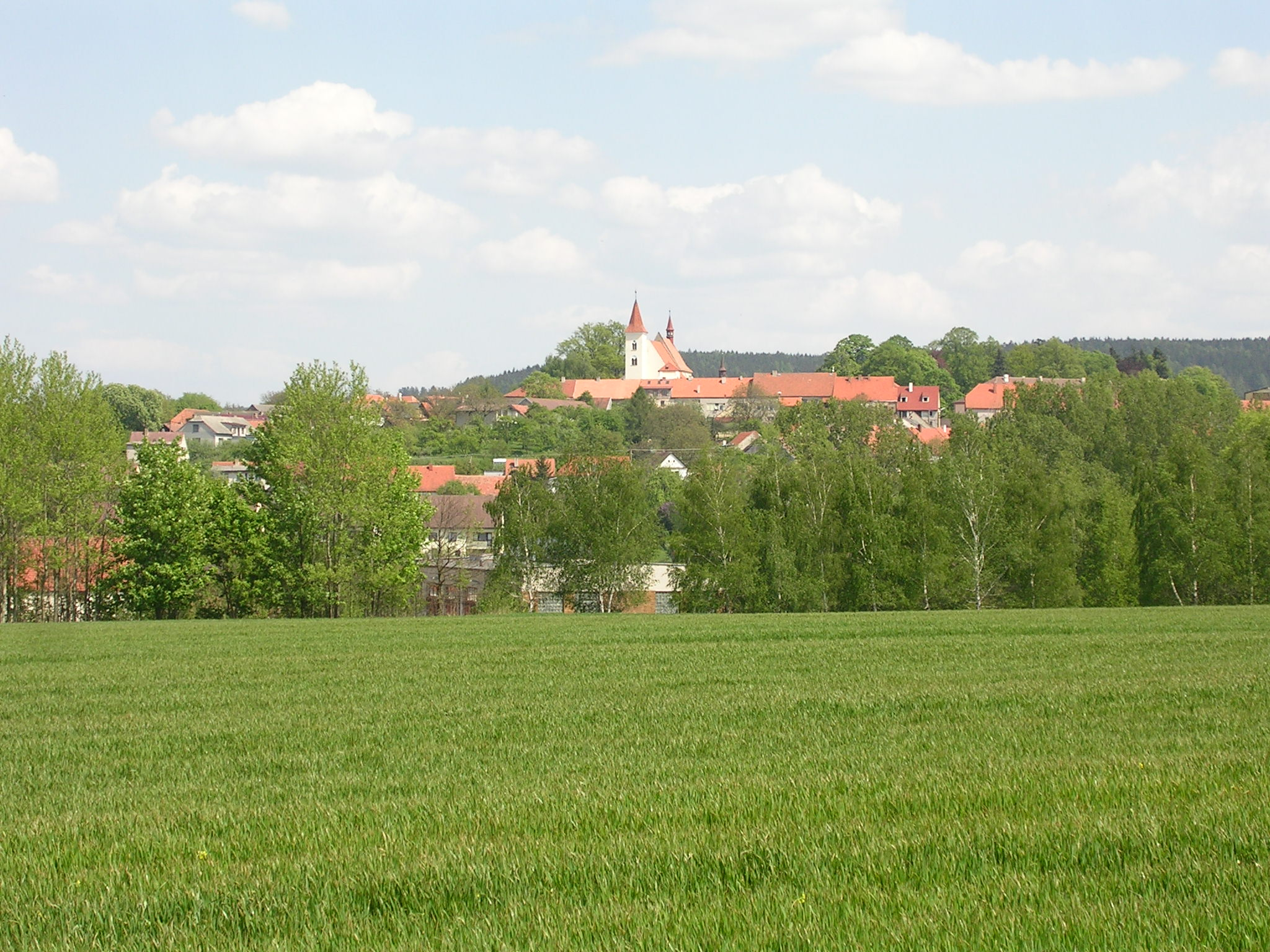
- Načeradec seen from the northwest

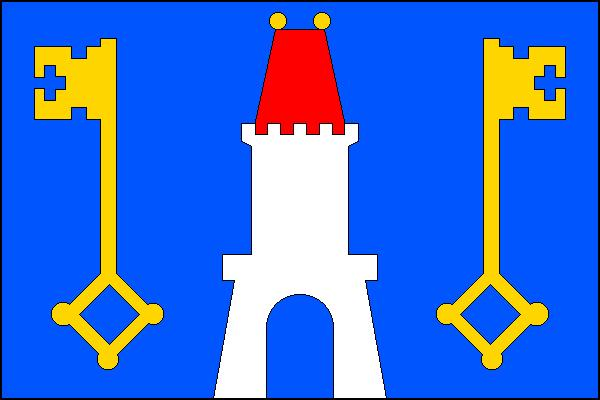
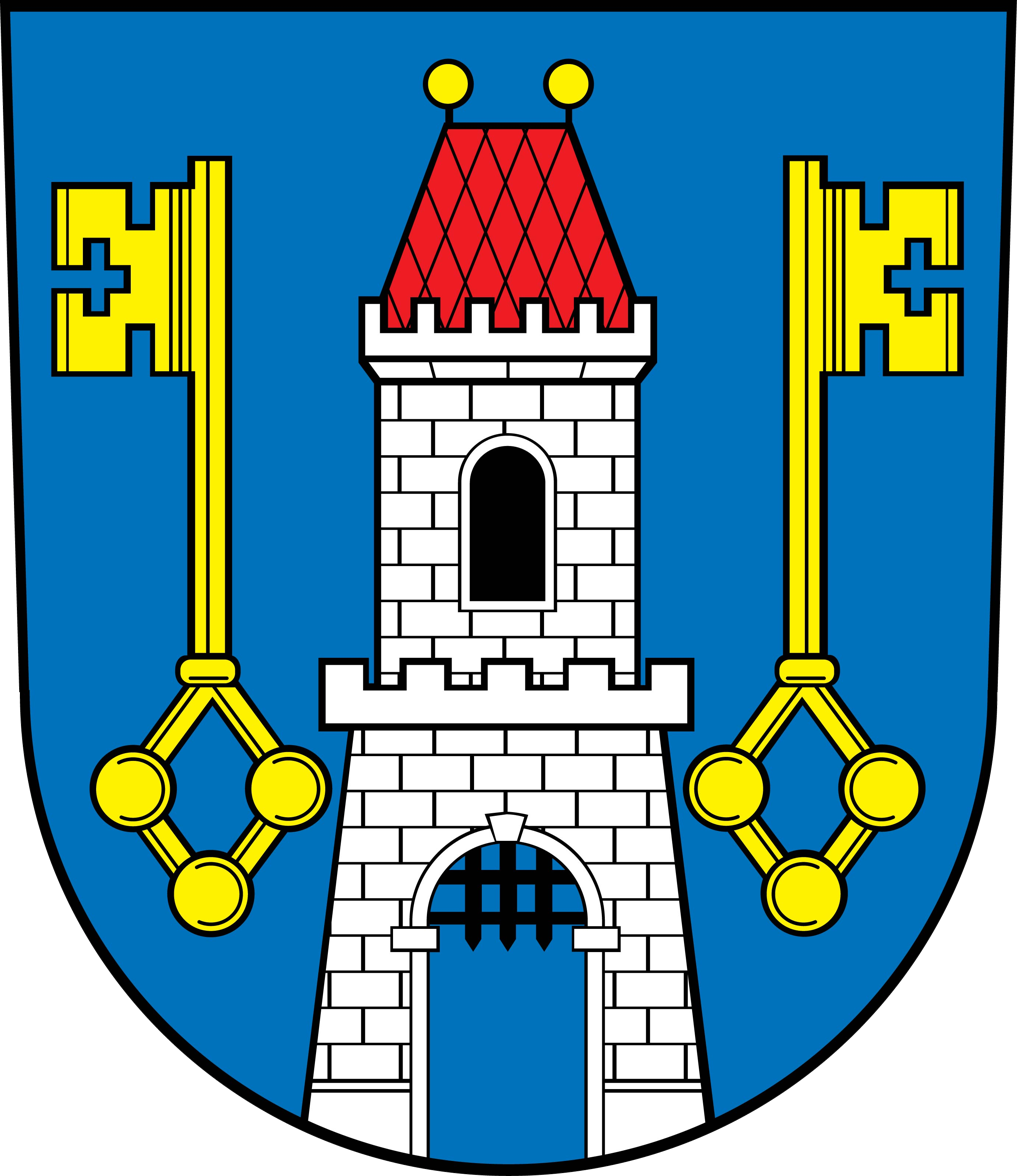
- Flag Coat of arms

- Location in the Czech Republic
- Coordinates: 49°36′37″N 14°54′23″E
- Country: Czech Republic
- Region: Central Bohemian
- District: Benešov
- First mentioned: 1184

Area
  - Total: 48.45 km^{2} (18.71 sq mi)
- Elevation: 528 m (1,732 ft)

Population (2026-01-01)
  - Total: 1,148
  - Density: 23.69/km^{2} (61.37/sq mi)
- Time zone: UTC+1 (CET)
  - Summer (DST): UTC+2 (CEST)
- Postal code: 257 08
- Website: www.naceradec.cz

Načeradec (Czech pronunciation: [ˈnatʃɛradɛts]) is a market town in Benešov District in the Central Bohemian Region of the Czech Republic. It has about 1,100 inhabitants. The historic centre of Načeradec is well preserved and is protected as an urban monument zone.

== Administrative division ==
Načeradec consists of 11 municipal parts (in brackets population according to the 2021 census):

- Načeradec (686)
- Daměnice (76)
- Dolní Lhota (38)
- Horní Lhota (74)
- Novotinky (14)
- Olešná (36)
- Pravětice (37)
- Řísnice (35)
- Slavětín (33)
- Vračkovice (22)
- Zdiměřice (0)

== Etymology ==
The initial name of Načeradec was Načerac. The name was derived from the personal name Načerat, meaning "Načerat's (court)".

== Geography ==
Načeradec is located about 25 kilometres (16 mi) southeast of Benešov and 56 km (35 mi) southeast of Prague. Most of the municipal territory lies in the Křemešník Highlands. The northwestern part lies in the Vlašim Uplands and extends into the Blaník Protected Landscape Area. The highest point is the hill Řísnický vrch at 689 m (2,260 ft) above sea level.

== History ==
The first written mention of Načeradec is from 1184.

== Demographics ==
Historical population

Year	Pop.	±%
1869	4,246	—
1880	4,342	+2.3%
1890	3,881	−10.6%
1900	3,723	−4.1%
1910	3,705	−0.5%

Year	Pop.	±%
1921	3,636	−1.9%
1930	3,137	−13.7%
1950	2,229	−28.9%
1961	1,971	−11.6%
1970	1,658	−15.9%

Year	Pop.	±%
1980	1,341	−19.1%
1991	1,154	−13.9%
2001	1,055	−8.6%
2011	1,003	−4.9%
2021	1,051	+4.8%

Source: Censuses

== Transport ==
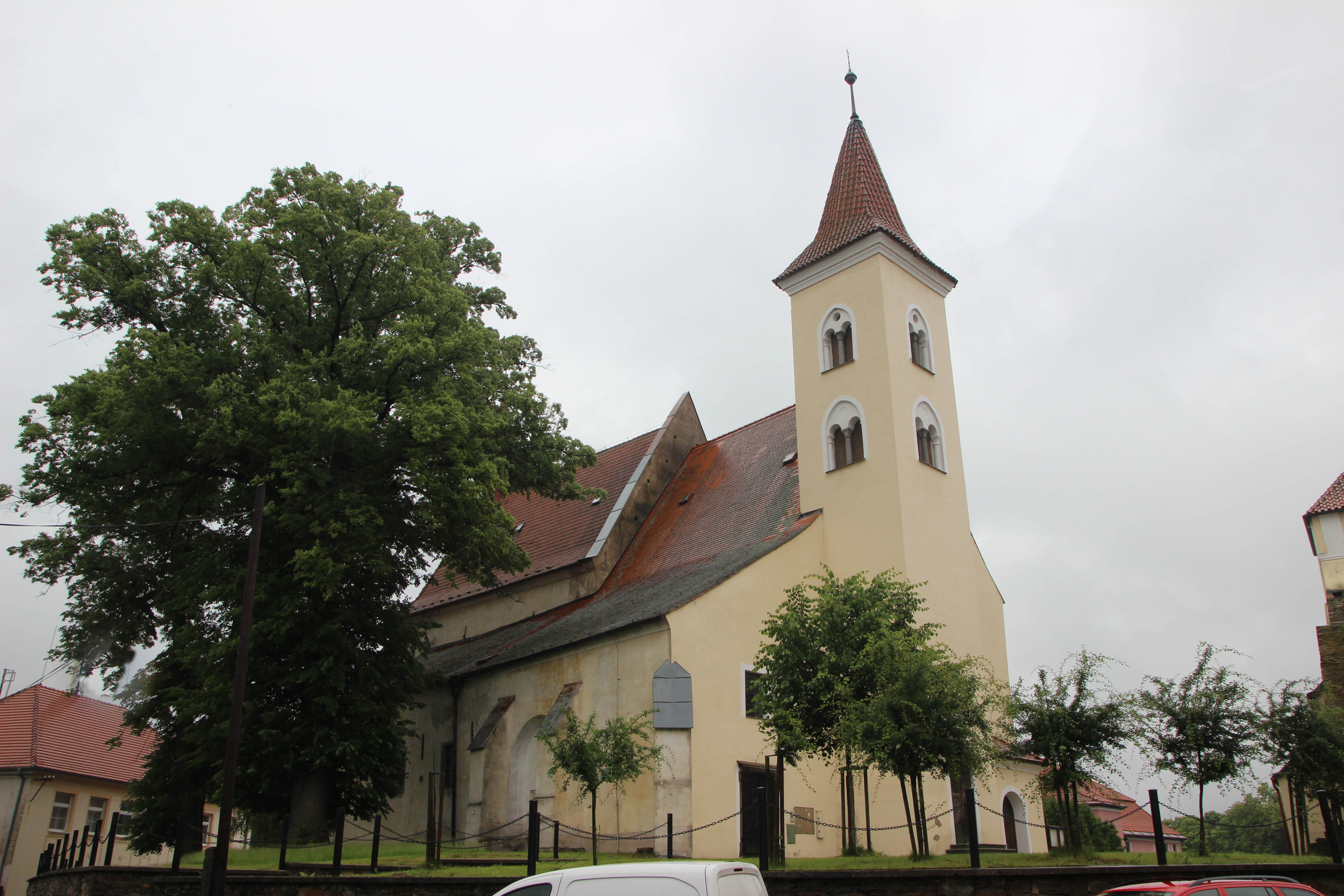
Church of Saints Peter and Paul

There are no railways or major roads passing through the municipality.

== Sights ==
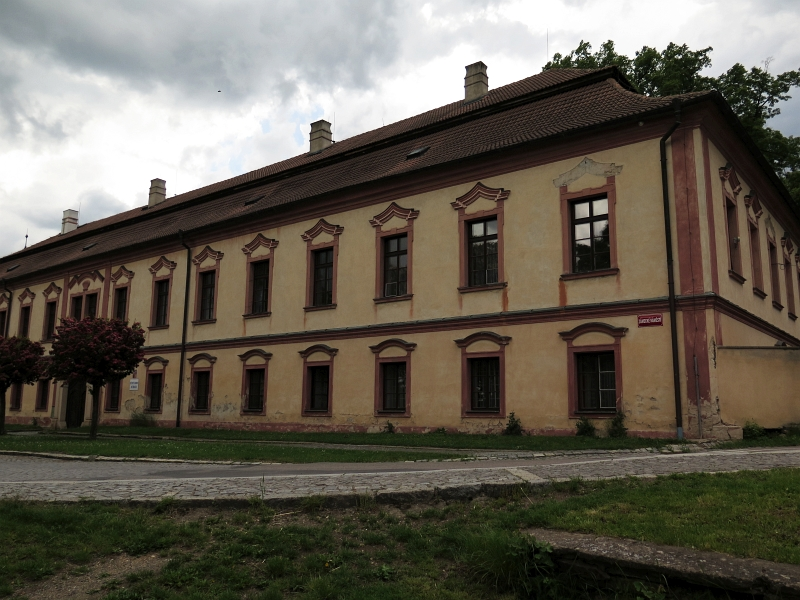
Načeradec Castle

The Romanesque part of the Church of Saints Peter and Paul is from around 1120. Next to the church stands as a remnant of the church fortifications an old bastion from 1278, which is transformed into a bell tower. The bell in the bell tower is from 1512. There is also one the rare Načeradec Missal from the 13th century.

Other sights include a Baroque castle from 1734, a town hall from 1738, and 13 chapels of the Stations of the Cross.
