= Adršpach =

- Municipality
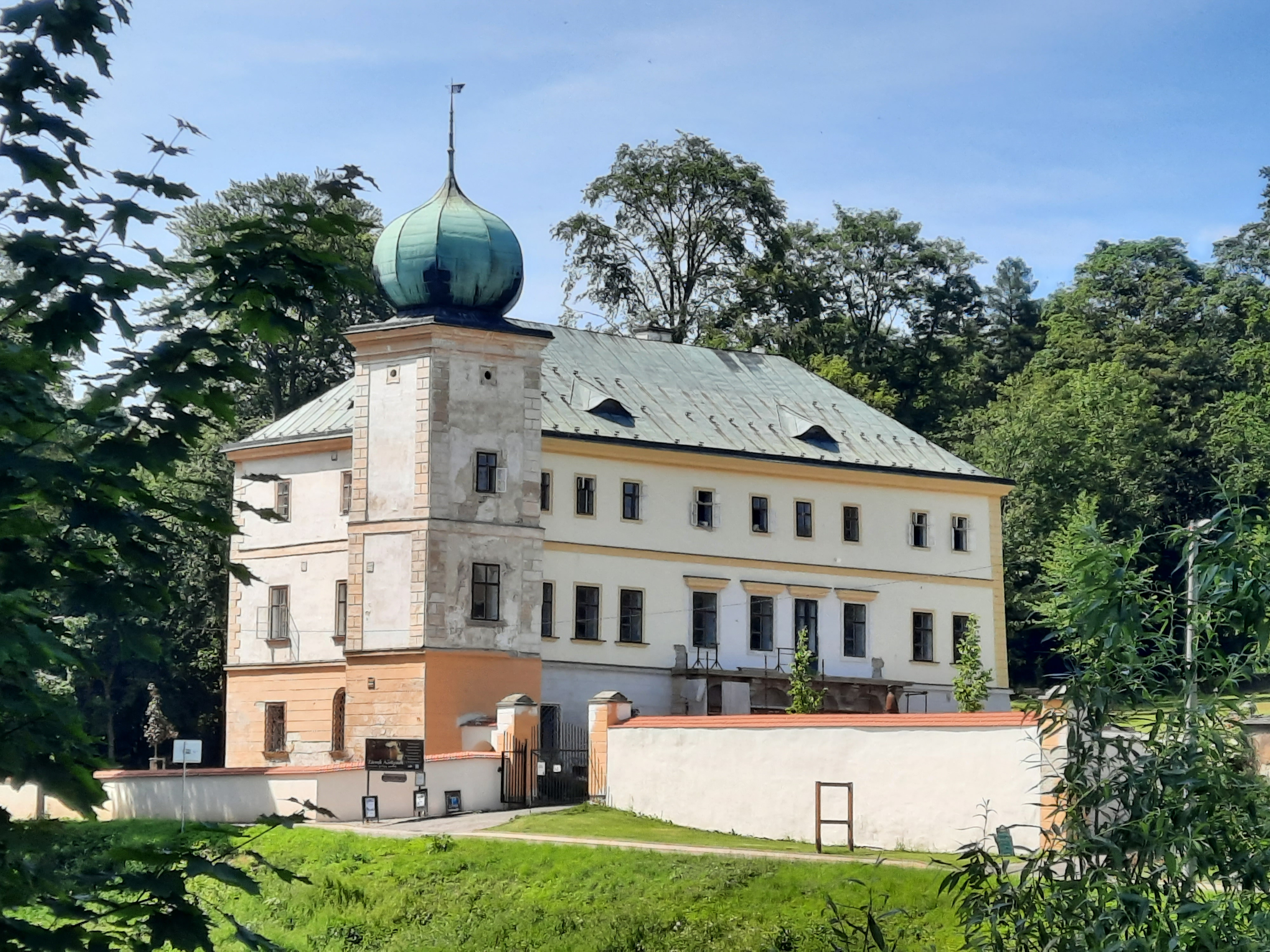
- Adršpach Castle

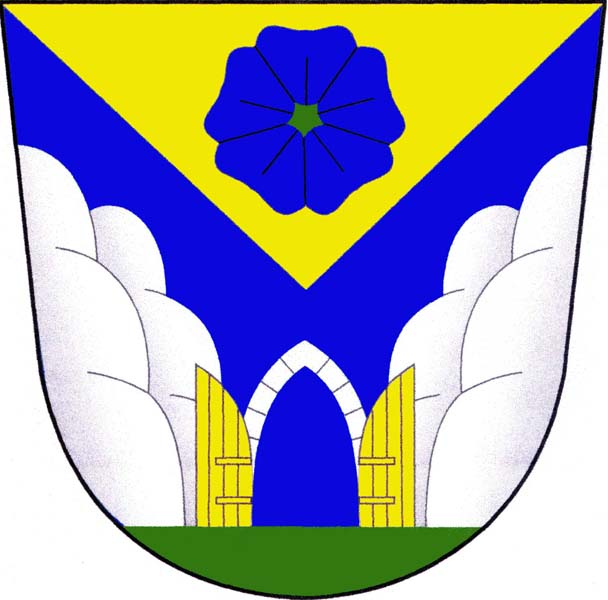
- Flag Coat of arms

- Location in the Czech Republic
- Coordinates: 50°37′7″N 16°6′31″E
- Country: Czech Republic
- Region: Hradec Králové
- District: Náchod
- First mentioned: 1348

Area
  - Total: 19.65 km^{2} (7.59 sq mi)
- Elevation: 554 m (1,818 ft)

Population (2026-01-01)
  - Total: 491
  - Density: 25.0/km^{2} (64.7/sq mi)
- Time zone: UTC+1 (CET)
  - Summer (DST): UTC+2 (CEST)
- Postal code: 549 52
- Website: www.obecadrspach.cz

Adršpach (German: Adersbach) is a municipality in Náchod District in the Hradec Králové Region of the Czech Republic. It has about 500 inhabitants. It is known for the Adršpach-Teplice Rocks.

== Administrative division ==
Adršpach consists of two municipal parts (in brackets population according to the 2021 census):

- Dolní Adršpach (131)
- Horní Adršpach (337)

== Etymology ==
The initial German name of the settlement was Ebersbach, meaning "Eber's stream". Eber was an abbreviated form of the name Eberhart/Eberhard. The Czech name Adršpach was created by transcription and gradual changes of the German name.

== Geography ==
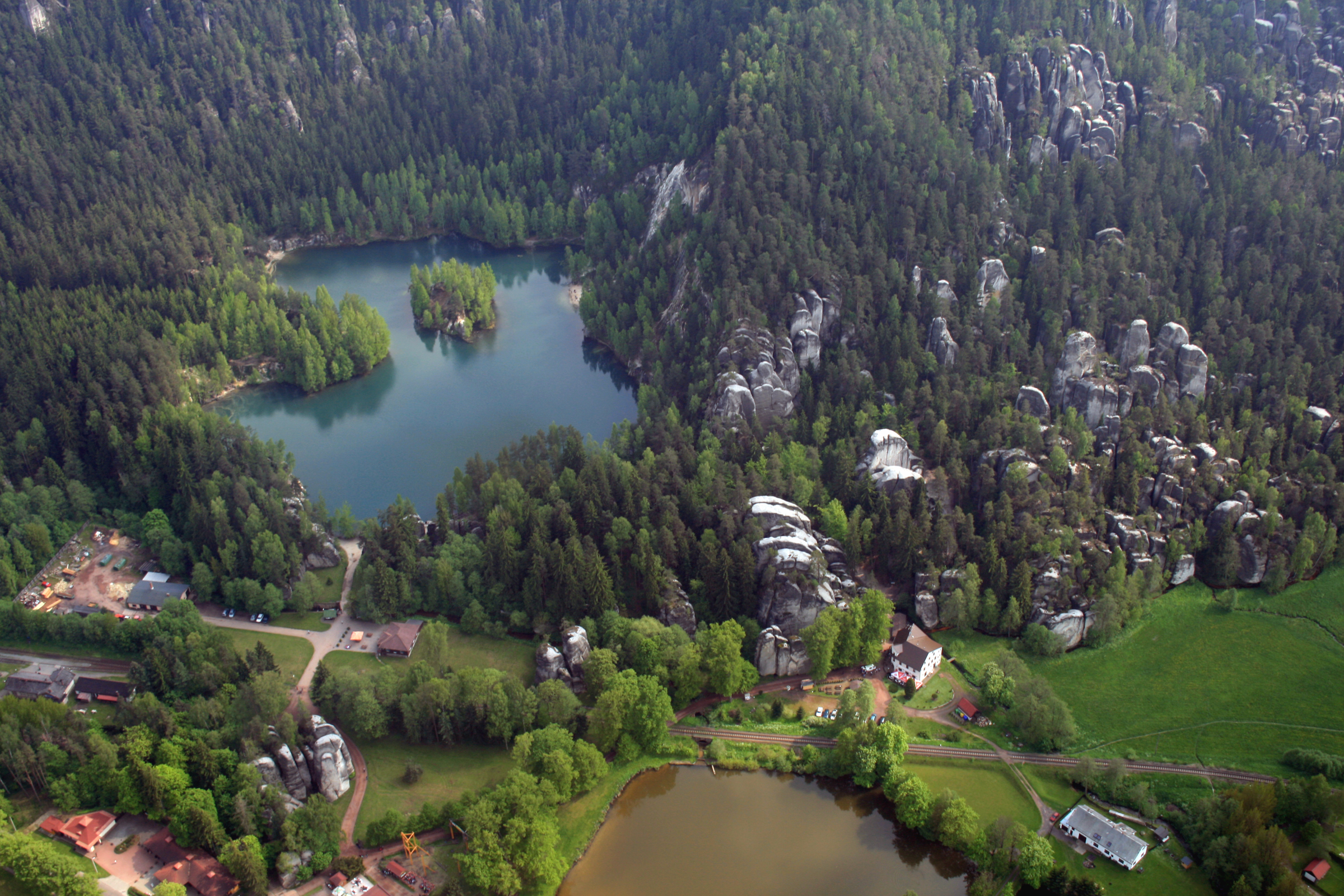
Adršpach-Teplice Rocks with Lake Pískovna

Adršpach is located about 23 kilometres (14 mi) north of Náchod and 49 km (30 mi) northeast of Hradec Králové. It borders Poland in the west. It lies in the Broumov Highlands. The highest point is the hill Dlouhý vrch at 698 m (2,290 ft) above sea level. The Metuje river flows through the municipality. The largest body of water is Lake Pískovna, created by flooding of a sandstone quarry.

The whole territory of Adršpach lies in the Broumovsko Protected Landscape Area. Adršpach is known for the Adršpach-Teplice Rocks, a set of sandstone formations protected as a national nature reserve.

== History ==
The first written mention of Adršpach is from 1348.

== Demographics ==
Historical population

Year	Pop.	±%
1869	1,424	—
1880	1,674	+17.6%
1890	1,660	−0.8%
1900	1,538	−7.3%
1910	1,605	+4.4%

Year	Pop.	±%
1921	1,449	−9.7%
1930	1,490	+2.8%
1950	789	−47.0%
1961	660	−16.3%
1970	565	−14.4%

Year	Pop.	±%
1980	609	+7.8%
1991	535	−12.2%
2001	508	−5.0%
2011	511	+0.6%
2021	468	−8.4%

Source: Censuses

== Transport ==
Adršpach is located on the railway line Trutnov–Teplice nad Metují. The municipality is served by two train stations: Adršpach and Horní Adršpach.

== Sights ==
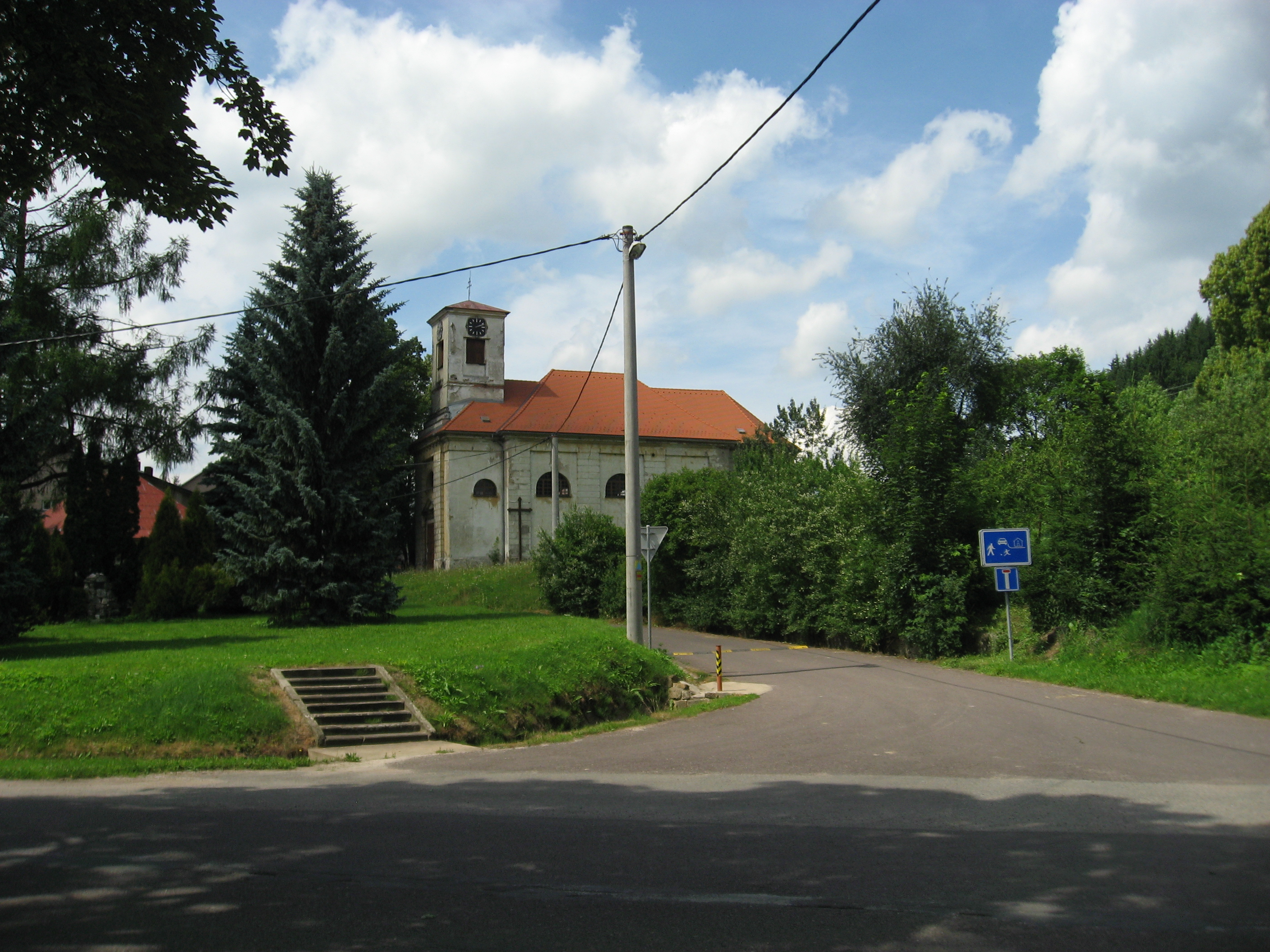
Church of the Exaltation of the Holy Cross

The main tourist destination is the Adršpach Castle in Dolní Adršpach. It is a small aristocratic residence, built for the Bohdanecký of Hodkov family in the Renaissance style at the turn of the 16th and 17th centuries. Today, the castle houses the Climbing Museum and expositions about life at the castle and about flax industry.

A cultural monument is the ruin of the original Gothic castle, located on a hill above Dolní Adršpach. The castle was probably founded in the first half of the 14th century, but it was demolished in 1447, after being occupied by robbers. A few fragments have survived.

The Church of the Exaltation of the Holy Cross is located in the centre of Horní Adršpach. It is a rare example of a Neoclassical church in the region, built in 1827–1831.

== In popular culture ==
The nature in the municipality was used as the filming location for several films and TV series, including The Chronicles of Narnia: The Lion, the Witch and the Wardrobe (2005) and The Musketeers (2014).

== Twin towns – sister cities ==
Adršpach is twinned with:

- Lubawka, Poland
- Radków, Poland
