= Adršpach-Teplice Rocks =

Protected area in the Czech Republic

Coordinates: 50°36′41″N 16°06′54″E

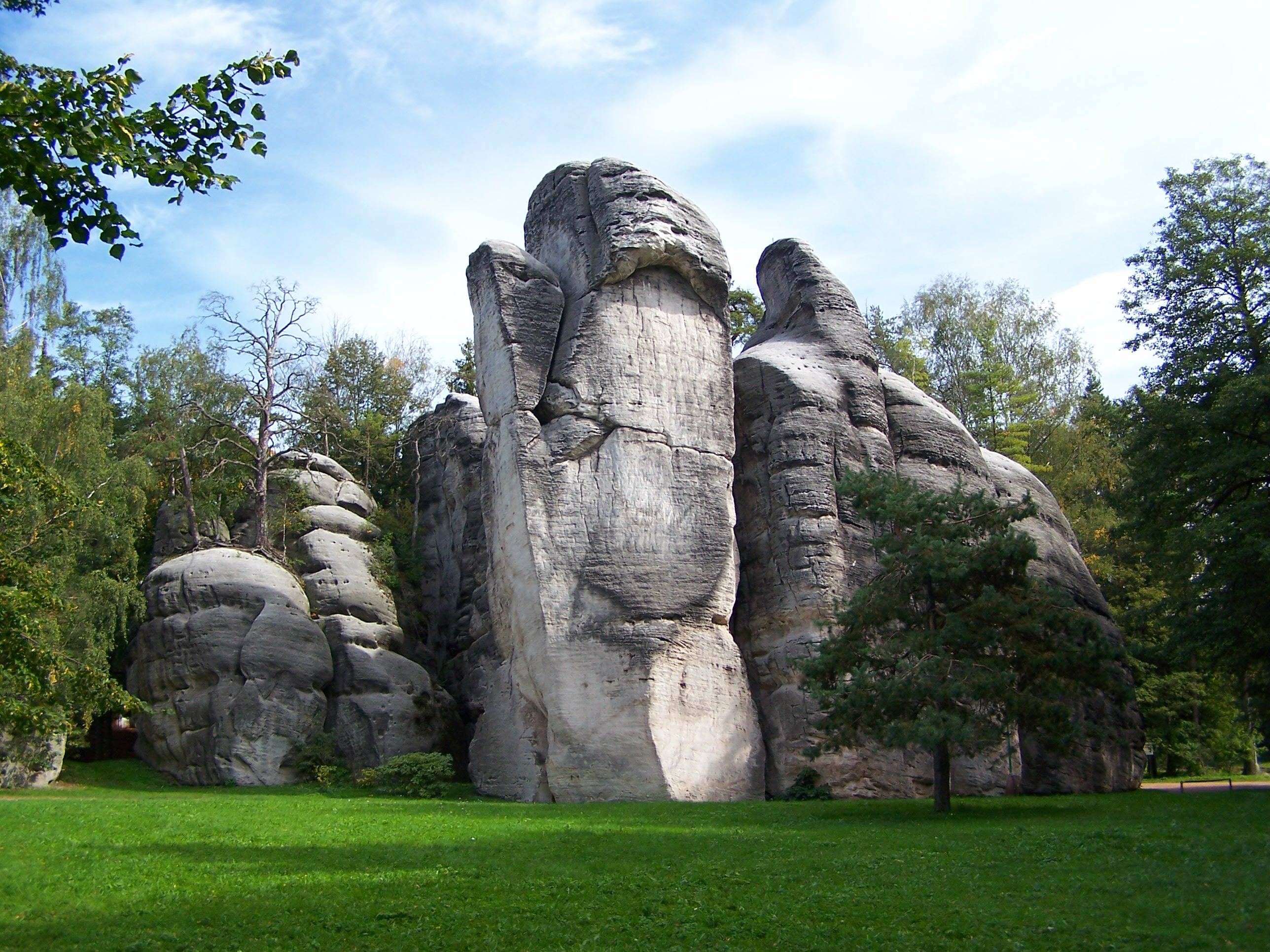
Adršpach-Teplice Rocks

Adršpach-Teplice Rocks

The Adršpach-Teplice Rocks (Czech: Adršpašsko-teplické skály, German: Adersbach-Weckelsdorfer Felsenstadt) are a set of sandstone formations in Hradec Králové Region of the Czech Republic. They are named after two nearby municipalities: Adršpach, and Teplice nad Metují.

The site was apparently a regional destination during the 19th and early 20th century, as attested by the varied language of stone inscriptions on the site, and surviving postcards.

The rocks have been protected as a national nature reserve since 1933, and since 1991 the reserve is within the Broumovsko Protected Landscape Area. The national nature reserve has an area of 17.12 km^{2} (6.61 sq mi).

The area is a popular destination for rock climbers. In recent years, it has become a focus for the high-risk climbing-related sport of rock jumping.

The area is also one of the largest permanent breeding sites of peregrine falcon in Europe, as they are protected here under national law. Some areas have been designated off limits to climbers and hikers to make sure the birds aren't disturbed.

== History ==
Towards the end of the 13th century, two castles were built here: Střmen and Adersbach, and later the castle and present-day ruin Bischofstein (Czech: Skály). Many rock formations were given imaginative names, such as “Spanish Wall,” “Grandfather’s Chair,” “Handle Jug,” “Sugar Loaf,” “Mayor,” “Lovers,” “Rübezahl’s Organ,” “Rübezahl’s Toothpick,” etc. The local population only ventured into the rock city when they felt threatened. Around 1700, the first nature lovers from Silesia came to the rock city. It has been accessible ever since. In 1790, Goethe visited it. In 1824, a forest fire broke out in the rocks that lasted several weeks and destroyed the entire surrounding forest. At the beginning of the 19th century, the first paths were laid out to make the rocks more accessible. The rock city has been a protected nature reserve since 1933.

== Gallery ==
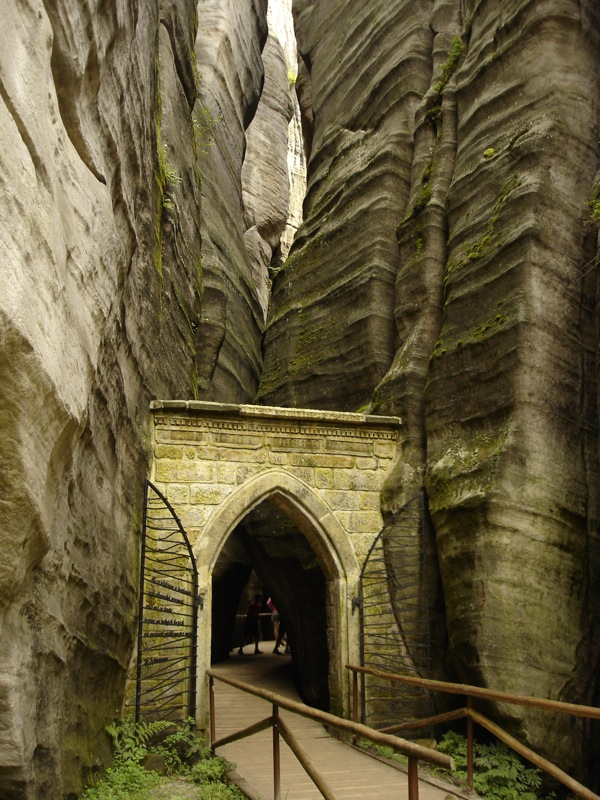

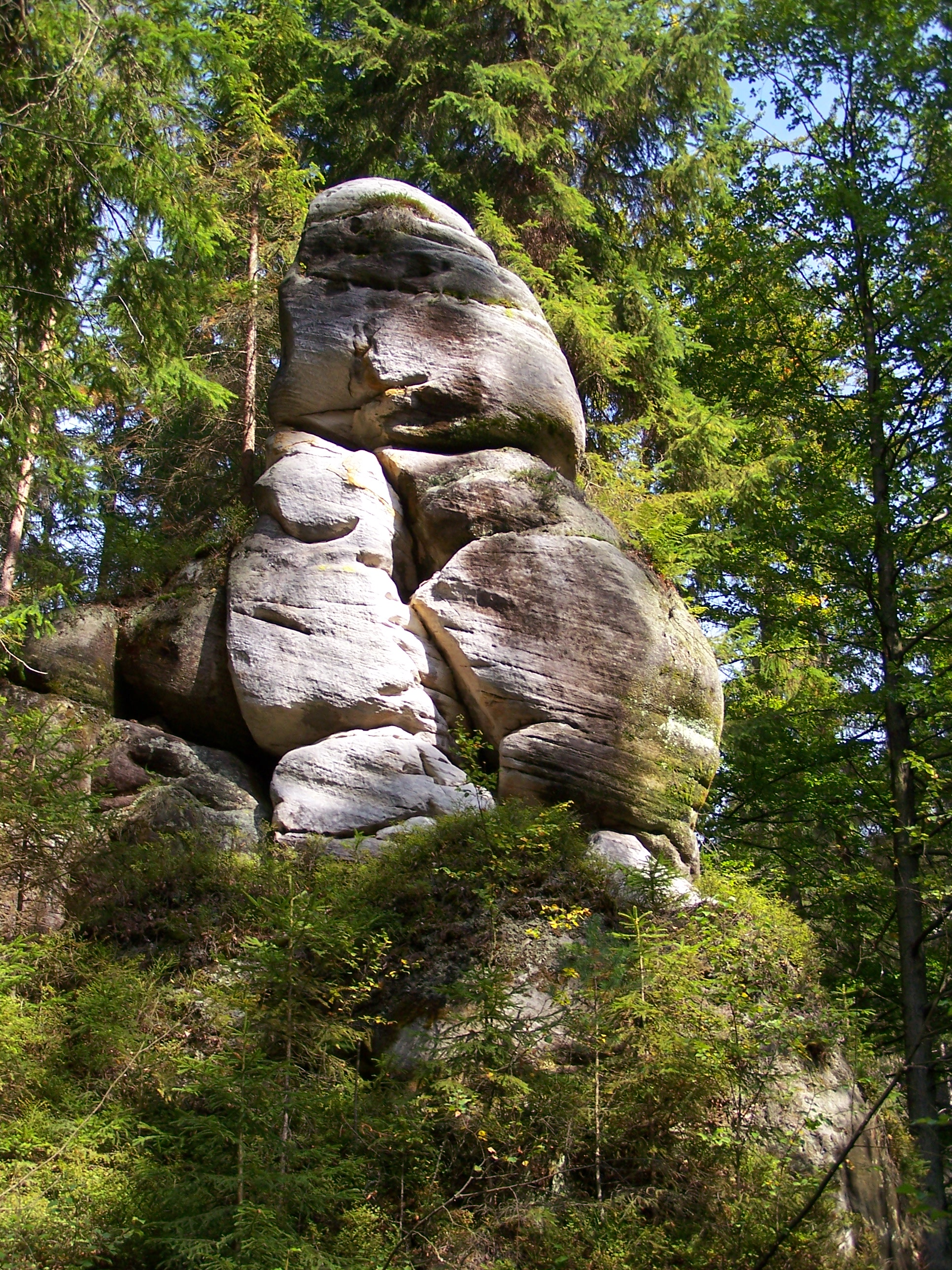

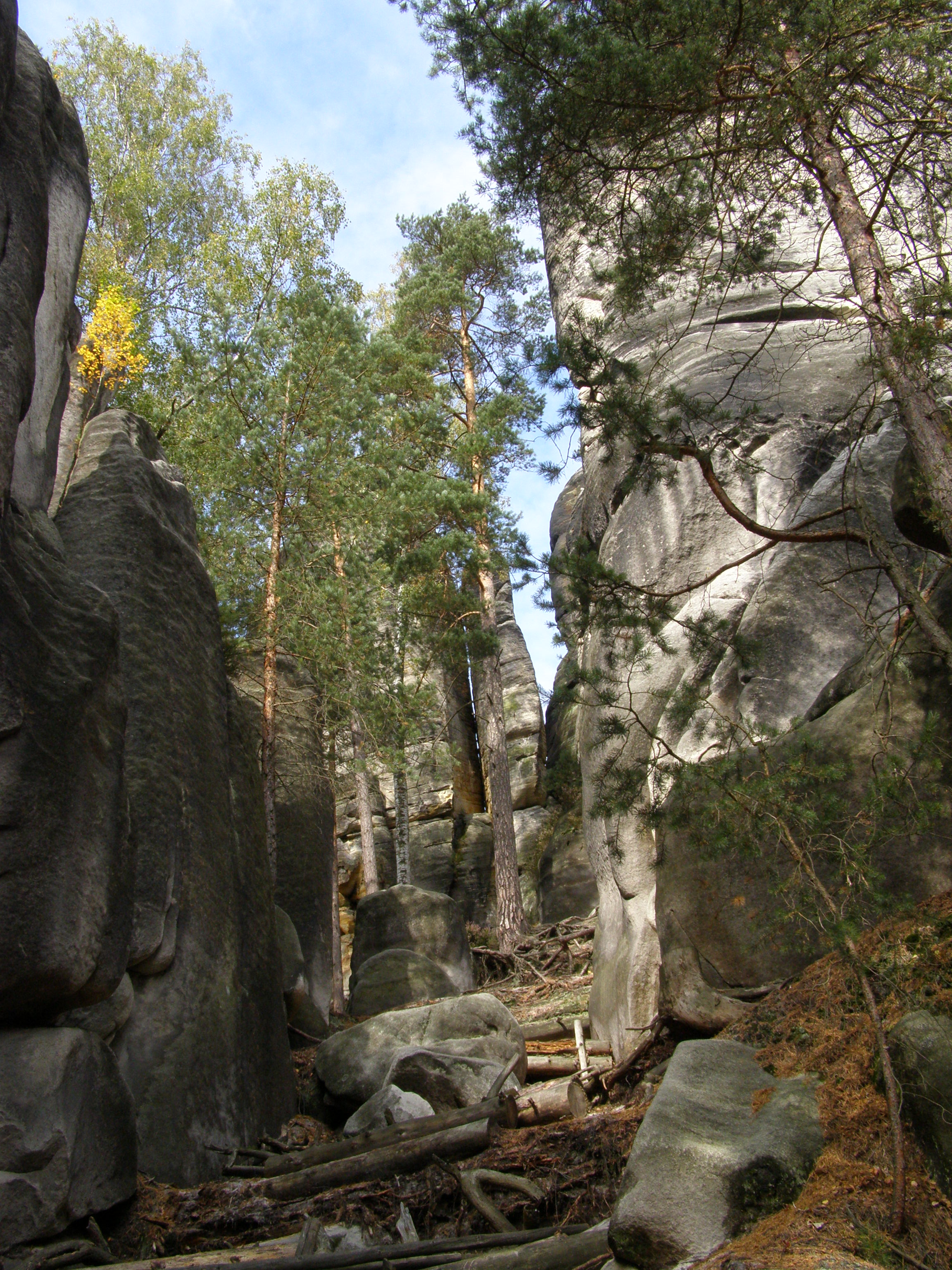

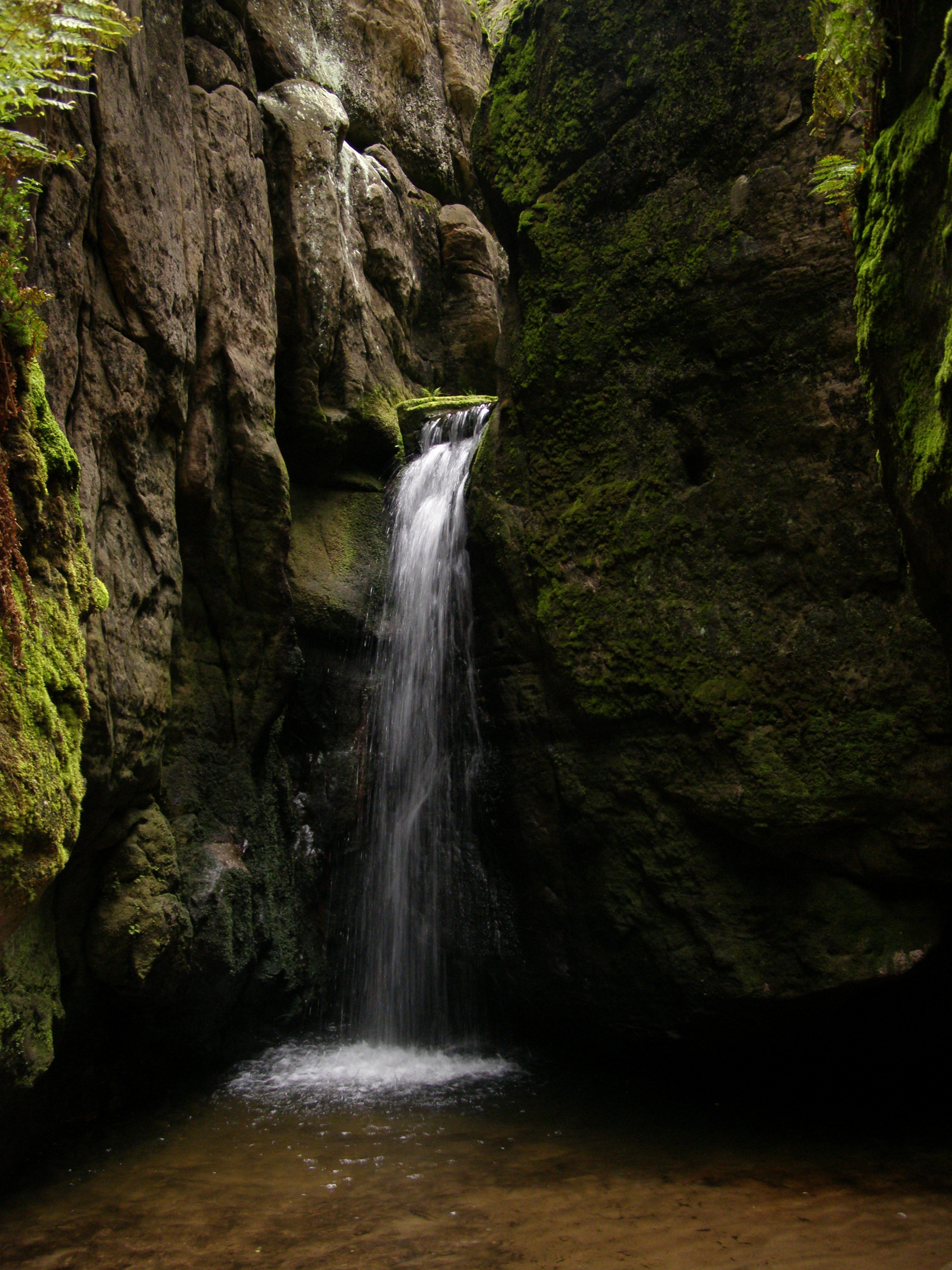

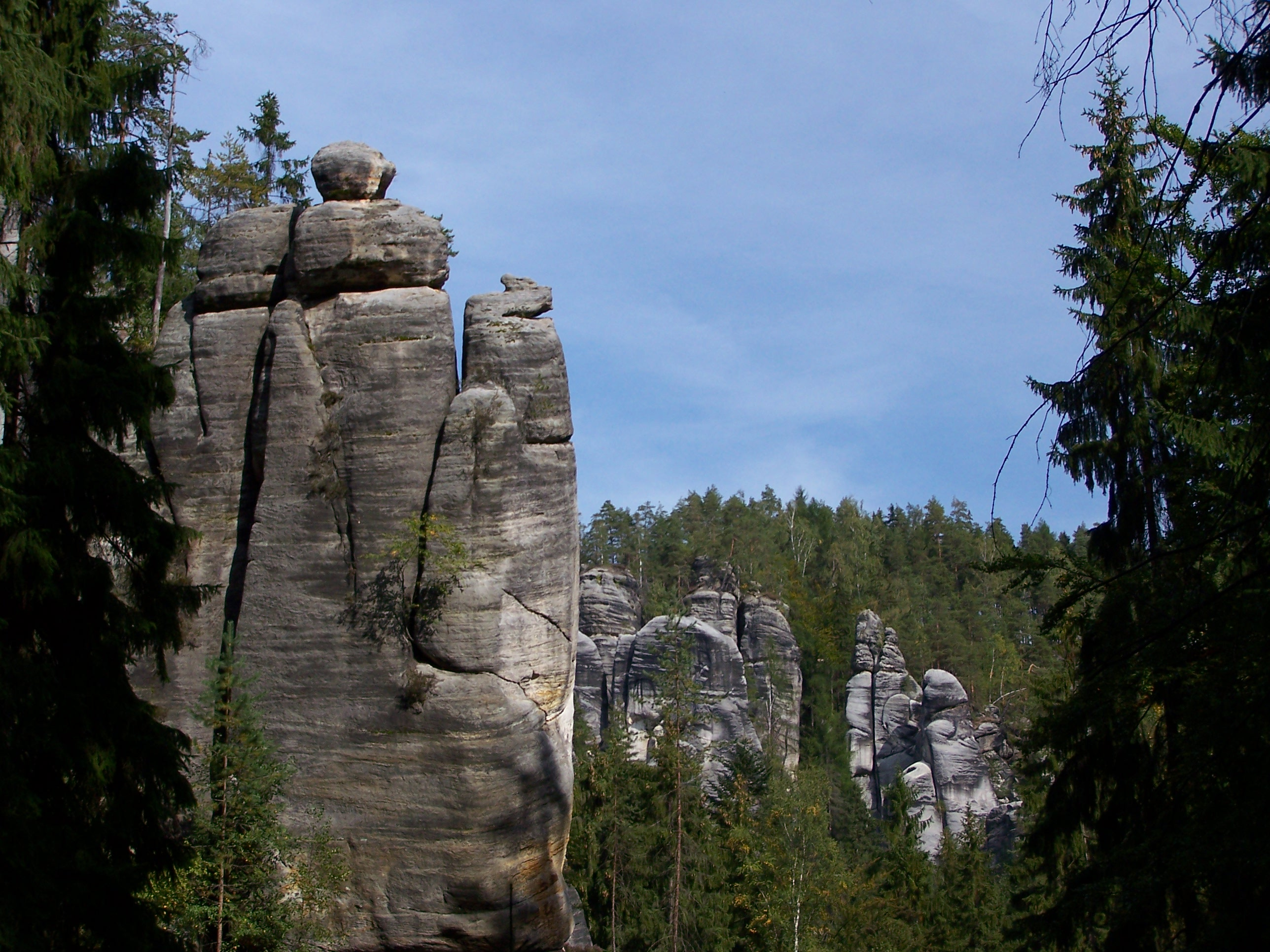

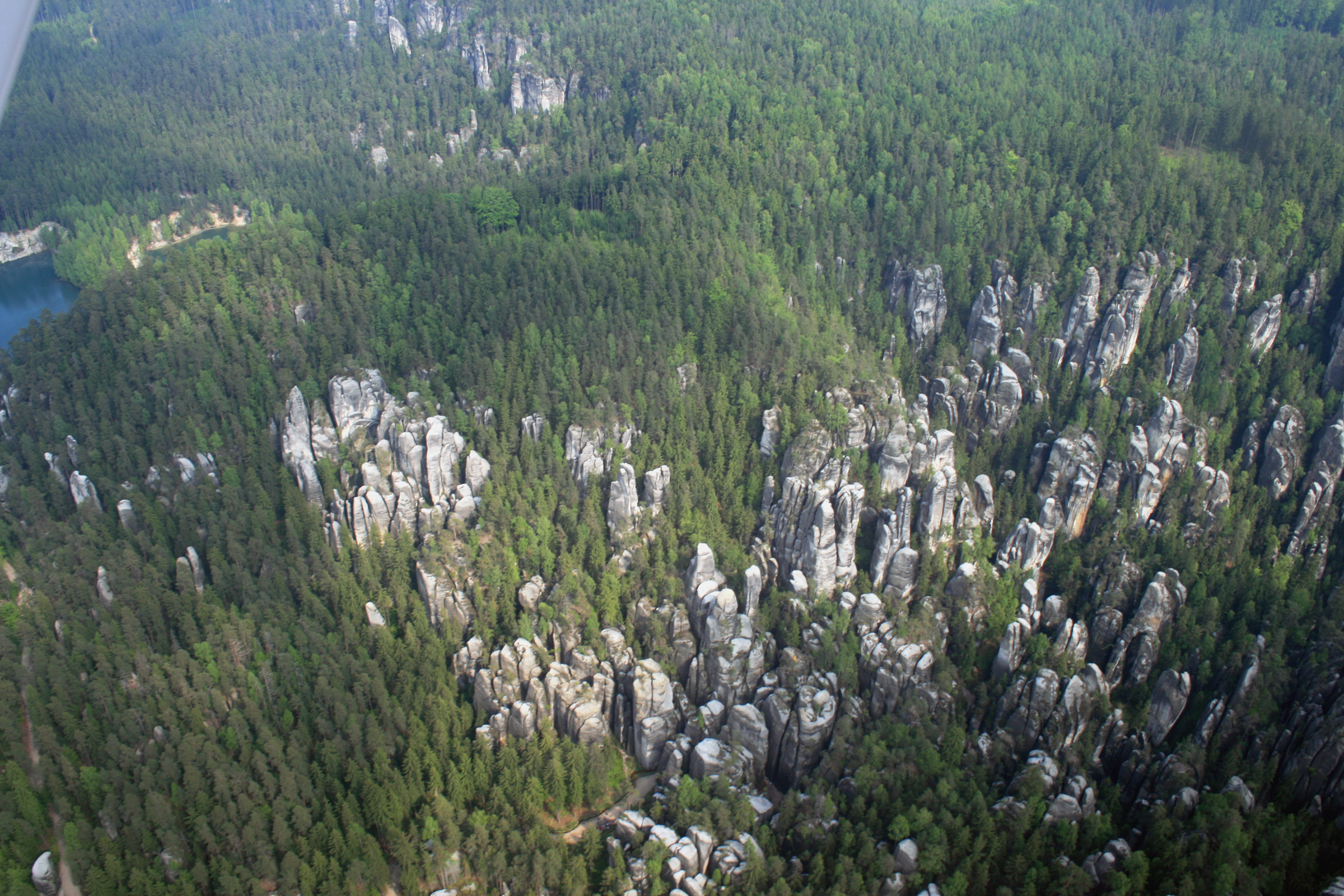
air view

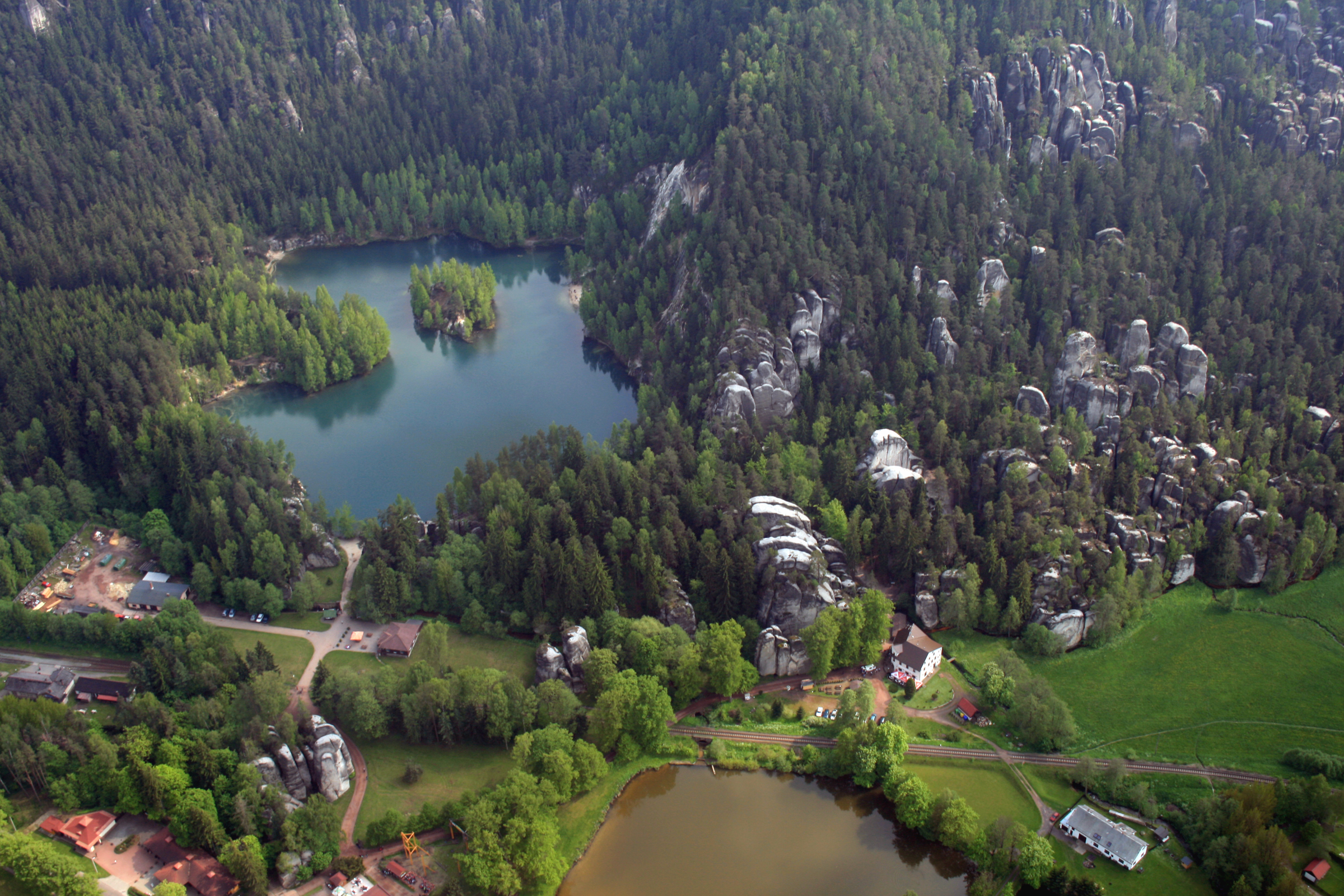
air view
