= Teplice nad Metují =

- Town
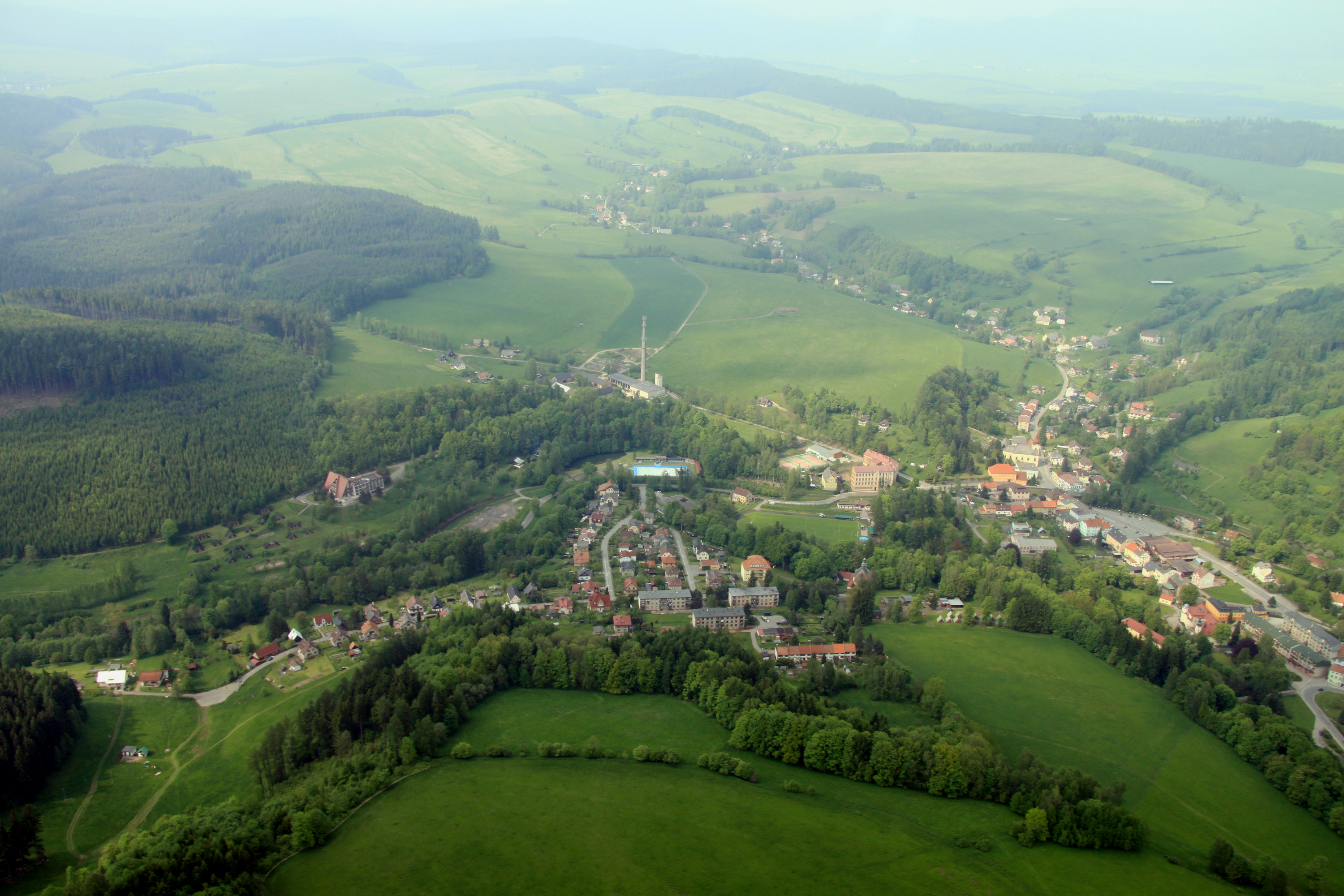
- Aerial view of Teplice nad Metují

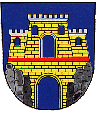
- Flag Coat of arms

- Location in the Czech Republic
- Coordinates: 50°35′36″N 16°10′13″E
- Country: Czech Republic
- Region: Hradec Králové
- District: Náchod
- First mentioned: 1362

Government
  - Mayor: Josef Bitnar

Area
  - Total: 56.06 km^{2} (21.64 sq mi)
- Elevation: 463 m (1,519 ft)

Population (2026-01-01)
  - Total: 1,584
  - Density: 28.26/km^{2} (73.18/sq mi)
- Time zone: UTC+1 (CET)
  - Summer (DST): UTC+2 (CEST)
- Postal code: 549 57
- Website: www.teplicenadmetuji.cz

Teplice nad Metují (Czech pronunciation: [ˈtɛplɪtsɛ ˈnad mɛtujiː]; German: Weckelsdorf) is a town in Náchod District in the Hradec Králové Region of the Czech Republic. It has about 1,600 inhabitants. The town is located on the Metuje River in the Broumov Highlands. The town is known for the national nature reserve of Adršpach-Teplice Rocks.

== Administrative division ==
Teplice nad Metují consists of five municipal parts (in brackets population according to the 2021 census):

- Teplice nad Metují (796)
- Bohdašín (60)
- Dědov (40)
- Dolní Teplice (235)
- Horní Teplice (110)
- Javor (59)
- Lachov (89)
- Libná (5)
- Skály (10)
- Zdoňov (163)

== Etymology ==
The Old Czech word teplice (from teplý = 'warm') means 'warm water', 'hot water'.

== Geography ==
Teplice nad Metují is located about 19 kilometres (12 mi) north of Náchod and 21 km (13 mi) southwest of the Polish city of Wałbrzych. It is located on the border with Poland. It lies in the Broumov Highlands, in the Broumovsko Protected Landscape Area. The highest point is the hill Čáp at 786 m (2,579 ft) above sea level. The Metuje River flows through the town.

Teplice nad Metují is known for the Adršpach-Teplice Rocks, a set of sandstone formations protected as a national nature reserve.

== History ==
The predecessors of Teplice nad Metují and villages in the municipality were the castles Střmen and Skály, built for protection of a trade route in the 13th century, and small settlements around them. The first written mention of Teplice located below Střmen is from 1362. The Střmen castle was demolished in 1447. From 1614 to 1848, Teplice was divided into Horní Teplice and Dolní Teplice ('lower Teplice' and 'upper Teplice') and had different owners.

During World War II, the German occupiers operated the E431 forced labour subcamp of the Stalag VIII-B/344 prisoner-of-war camp in Dolní Teplice.

== Demographics ==
Historical population

Year	Pop.	±%
1869	6,495	—
1880	6,486	−0.1%
1890	6,292	−3.0%
1900	6,128	−2.6%
1910	6,154	+0.4%

Year	Pop.	±%
1921	5,475	−11.0%
1930	5,206	−4.9%
1950	2,556	−50.9%
1961	2,447	−4.3%
1970	2,379	−2.8%

Year	Pop.	±%
1980	2,136	−10.2%
1991	1,906	−10.8%
2001	1,840	−3.5%
2011	1,698	−7.7%
2021	1,567	−7.7%

Source: Censuses

== Transport ==
On the Czech–Polish border are the road border crossing Zdoňov / Łączna and the pedestrian border crossing Libná / Chełmsko Śląskie.

Teplice nad Metují is located on the railway lines Broumov–Starkoč and Trutnov–Teplice nad Metují. There are four train stations and stops: Teplice nad Metují, Teplice nad Metují město, Teplice nad Metují skály and Dědov.

== Sights ==
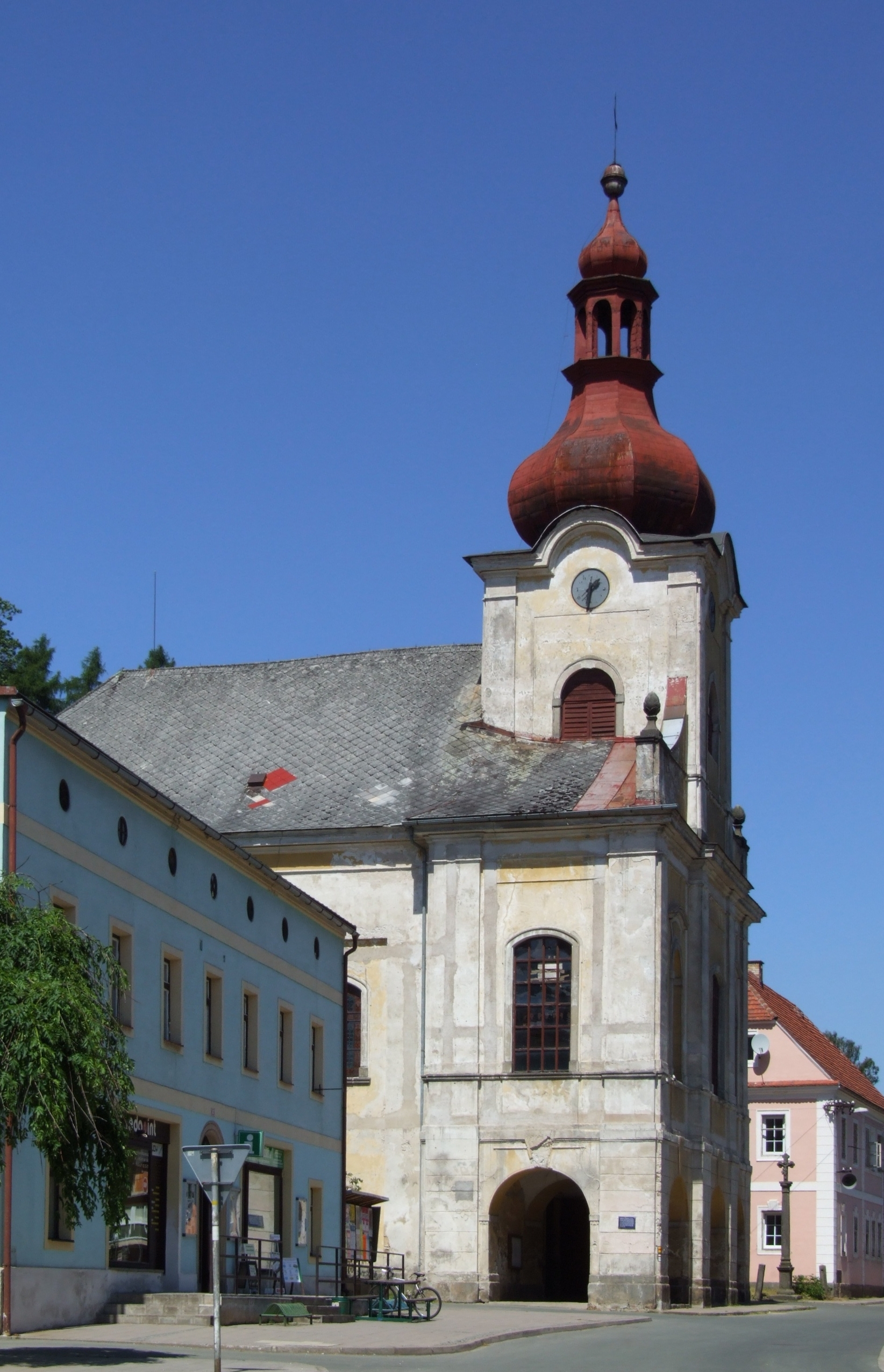
Church of Saint Lawrence

The Church of Saint Lawrence was built in the Baroque style in 1724. The pilgrimage Church of Our Lady Help of Christians was built in 1754–1763 and has a unique wooden hermitage.

The castle Horní zámek ('upper castle') was built in the Renaissance style in 1599 and today serves as the municipal office. The early Baroque castle Dolní zámek ('lower castle') from 1664 houses a retirement home.

On the hill Čáp is the eponymous observation tower. It was built in 2014 and has a height of 13 m (43 ft).

== Notable people ==
- Josef Tichatschek (1807–1886), opera singer

== Twin towns – sister cities ==
Teplice nad Metují is twinned with:

- Jaworzyna Śląska, Poland
