= Hradec Králové Region =

Region of the Czech Republic

Hradec Králové Region Královéhradecký kraj
- Region
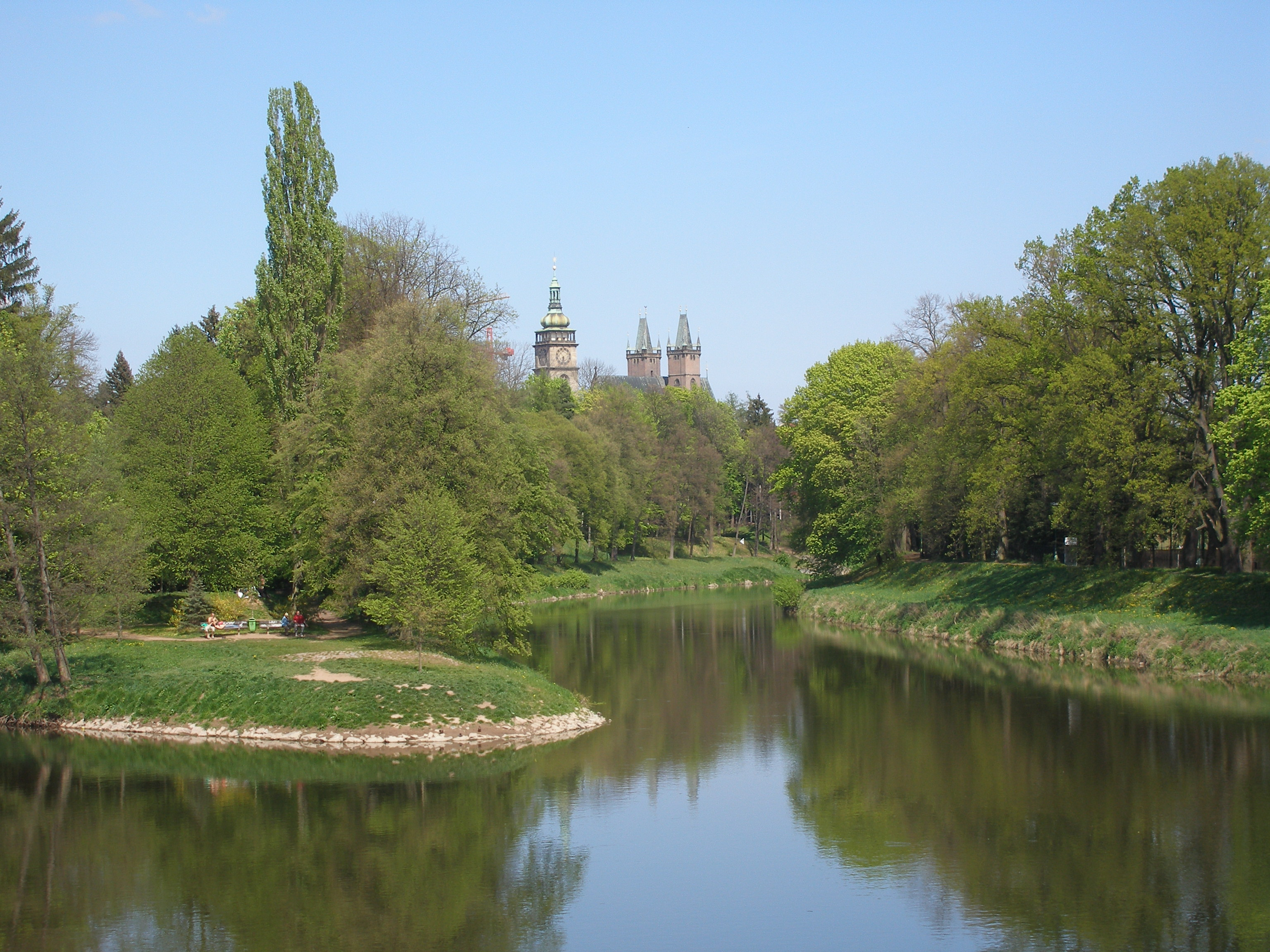

- Flag Coat of arms

- Country: Czech Republic
- Capital: Hradec Králové
- Districts: Jičín District, Náchod District, Rychnov nad Kněžnou District, Trutnov District

Government
  - Governor: Petr Koleta (ANO)

Area
  - Total: 4,758.54 km^{2} (1,837.28 sq mi)
- Highest elevation: 1,603 m (5,259 ft)

Population (2024-01-01)
  - Total: 556,949
  - Density: 117.042/km^{2} (303.137/sq mi)

GDP
  - Total: CZK 288.036 billion (€11.233 billion)
- ISO 3166 code: CZ-52
- Vehicle registration: H
- Website: www.kr-kralovehradecky.cz

Hradec Králové Region (Czech: Královéhradecký kraj, pronounced [ˈkraːlovɛːˌɦradɛtskiː ˈkraj]) is an administrative unit (Czech: kraj) of the Czech Republic located in the north-eastern part of the historical region of Bohemia. It is named after its capital Hradec Králové. The region neighbours the Pardubice Region in the south, the Central Bohemian Region in the south-west, and the Liberec Region in the west. It also shares a 208 km long international border with Polish Lower Silesian Voivodeship in the north and the east.

== Administrative divisions ==
After the state administration reform took place (1 January 2000); the Hradec Králové Region is divided into 5 districts:

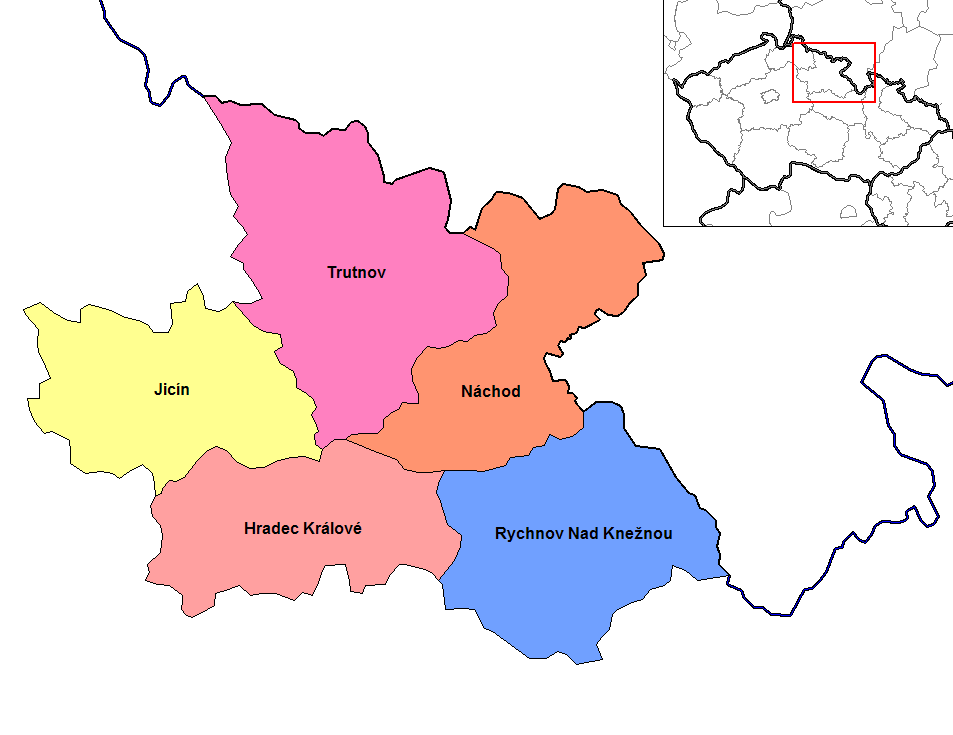
Districts of Hradec Králové Region

Hradec Králové
Jičín
Náchod

Rychnov Nad Kněžnou
Trutnov

As for area, Trutnov District is the largest taking almost one fourth of the entire region's territory, followed by the Rychnov nad Kněžnou District with 21% and as for the three remaining districts each has about 18%. As of 2003, 15 municipalities with extended powers and 35 municipalities with a delegated municipal office were established in the region.

== Population ==
As of January 2019, the Hradec Králové Region had 551,021 inhabitants, which was 5.2% of the total population of the Czech Republic. With its 116 inhabitants per square kilometer, the region has a lower density than the national average (135 inhabitants per km^{2}). The region has in total 448 independent municipalities, whereof 48 enjoy the status of town. The share of urban population is ca. 67%. The region's centre is Hradec Králové (92,742 inhabitants). About 12.5% inhabitants in the region live in a municipality of 500 inhabitants or less. Out of all Czech regions, the Hradec Králové Region has the lowest share of inhabitants aged 15–64 (67%) and the highest share of population aged 65+ (18%). Average age of both men and women is also above the national average.

The table below shows the municipalities in Hradec Králové Region with the largest population (as of 1 January 2024):

Name	Population	Area (km^{2})	District
Hradec Králové	93,906	106	Hradec Králové District
Trutnov	29,584	103	Trutnov District
Náchod	20,036	33	Náchod District
Jičín	16,230	25	Jičín District
Dvůr Králové nad Labem	15,339	36	Trutnov District
Jaroměř	12,541	24	Náchod District
Vrchlabí	12,131	28	Trutnov District
Rychnov nad Kněžnou	11,442	35	Rychnov nad Kněžnou District
Nové Město nad Metují	9,304	23	Náchod District
Nová Paka	9,060	29	Jičín District

Historical population

Year	Pop.	±%
1869	581,238	—
1880	617,817	+6.3%
1890	633,558	+2.5%
1900	650,787	+2.7%
1910	681,602	+4.7%

Year	Pop.	±%
1921	638,850	−6.3%
1930	654,763	+2.5%
1950	531,533	−18.8%
1961	540,838	+1.8%
1970	540,337	−0.1%

Year	Pop.	±%
1980	561,385	+3.9%
1991	552,809	−1.5%
2001	550,724	−0.4%
2011	547,916	−0.5%
2021	538,303	−1.8%

Source: Censuses

== Geography ==
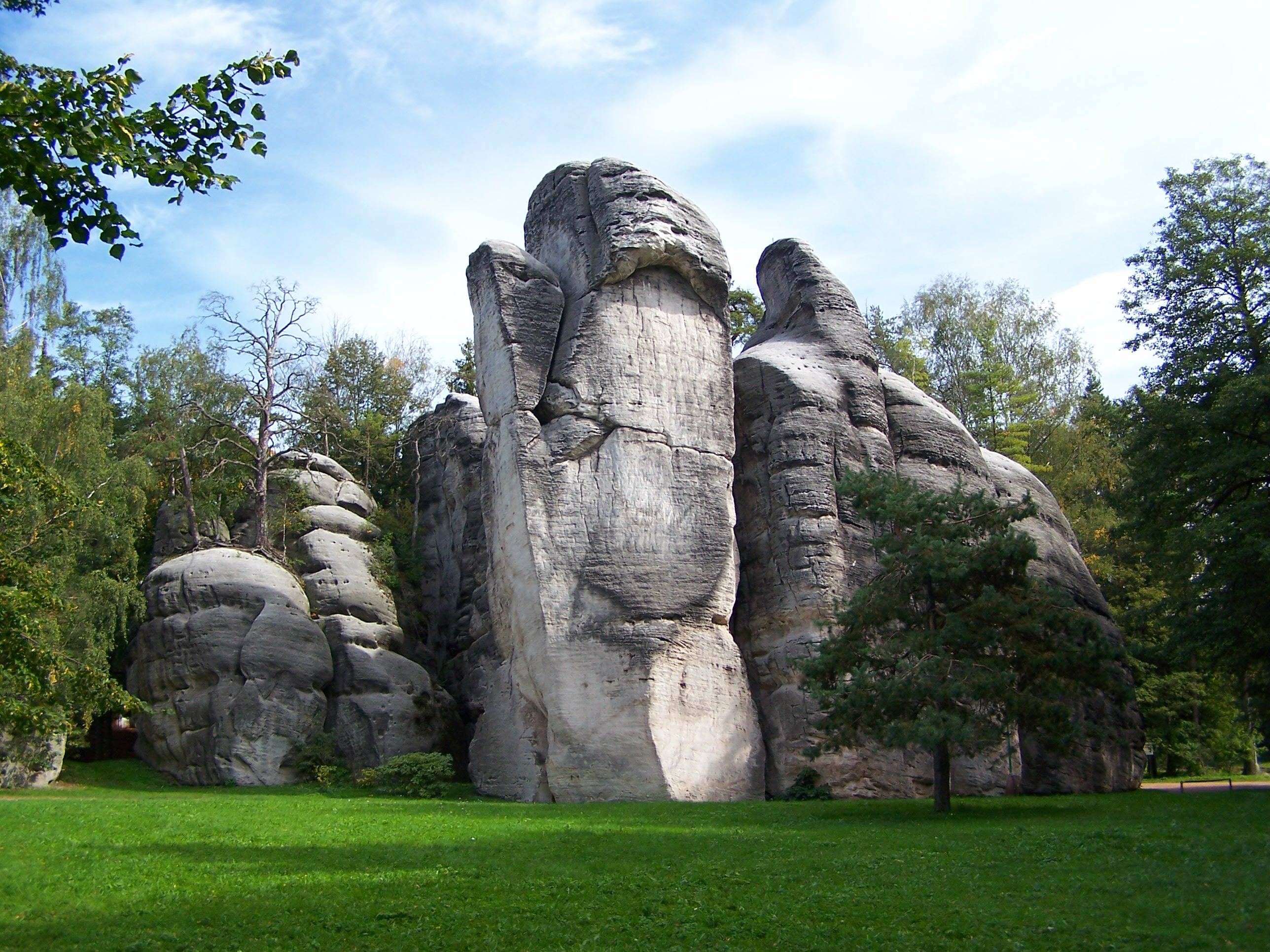
Adršpach-Teplice Rocks

The Hradec Králové Region has the area of 4 759 km^{2} and accounts for 6% of the total area of the Czech Republic. In terms of size it is the ninth largest region of the Czech Republic. Krkonoše and Orlické mountains which are situated in the northern and northeastern part of the region pass to fertile Elbe lowland. Two thirds of the area of the Krkonoše National Park lie within the region's territory. Krkonoše and Orlické mountains are separated by Broumovský výběžek with its large rock towns – Adršpach-Teplice Rocks, Broumov Hills, Křížový vrch and Ostaš. Main watercourses are Elbe (Czech: Labe) and its tributaries Orlice and Metuje. Almost the entire territory of the region falls into the Elbe's basin and only a marginal part of the Broumovský výběžek area falls under the basin of the River Oder (Czech: Odra). Sněžka mountain is with its elevation of 1603 m above sea level the highest point of the region, Krkonoše mountains and also of the Czech Republic. The lowest point of the region is the surface of the River Cidlina (202 m above sea level).

== Economy ==
In terms of economic activities, the region can be described as agricultural-industrial with well-developed tourism. The region is part of the so-called Black Triangle, an area of heavily industrialization and environmental damage on the three-way border of Poland, Germany, and the Czech Republic. The industry is concentrated in big towns while the agriculture in the Elbe lowland (Czech: Polabí). The tourism is concentrated in Krkonoše. In 2012, the gross domestic product of Hradec Králové Region accounted for about 4.5% of the total GDP of the Czech Republic. In 2021, the region's GDP per capita amounted to . As of CZK, ranking as the country's third highest September 2014, the unemployment rate in the region was 5.9%. The average gross salary was 22,842 CZK.

According to Labour Force Survey, there were in total about 253,200 employees in the region in 2012. Hereof, the largest proportion (31.1%) worked in manufacturing, followed by trade and repair of personal and household goods (12.2%), health and social care (7.9%), construction (7.3%), public administration and defence (6.5%), transportation and storage (5.9%), etc.

Manufacturing prevails over the other industries and focuses on motor vehicles, electrical equipment and textiles. However, Hradec Králové Region does not rank among key industrial areas – its 2012 share in sales of industrial enterprises accounted for 3.8% of the national's total. With regard to agriculture, crop production focuses on cereals (wheat and barley), rape and maize, with industrial sugar beet production playing an important role too. Animal production focuses on raising cattle and pigs. About 4.1% of region's workforce worked in agriculture, forestry and fishing in 2012. As of 2012, agricultural land covered 58% of the total region's territory and the share of arable land was 40%, while forests covered 31% of the territory.

In 2012, the 954 statistically monitored collective accommodation establishments in the region reported 887,000 guests, including about 213,000 foreigners coming especially from Germany, Poland and the Netherlands. The average length of stays per guest was 4.5 days. During the last few years, many forms of cross-border co-operation have been developed. One of them is the Glacensis Euroregion that had been established in 1995 as one of the Euroregions covering the Czech–Polish border areas.

== History ==
In July 2025 it was reported that during a rescue excavation next to future route 34, archaeologists have uncovered a large and remarkably well-preserved Celtic settlement near Hradec Králové, dating back to the La Tène period. The site covering an area of over 65 acres was a major economic and administrative center for the Celtic Boii tribe, whose name gave rise to “Bohemia.”. The excavations revealed more than 13,000 artifacts, including gold and silver coins, amber, ceramics, pottery kilns, glass workshops, and coin molds—evidence of sophisticated craftsmanship and trade along the ancient Amber Road.

== Places of interest ==
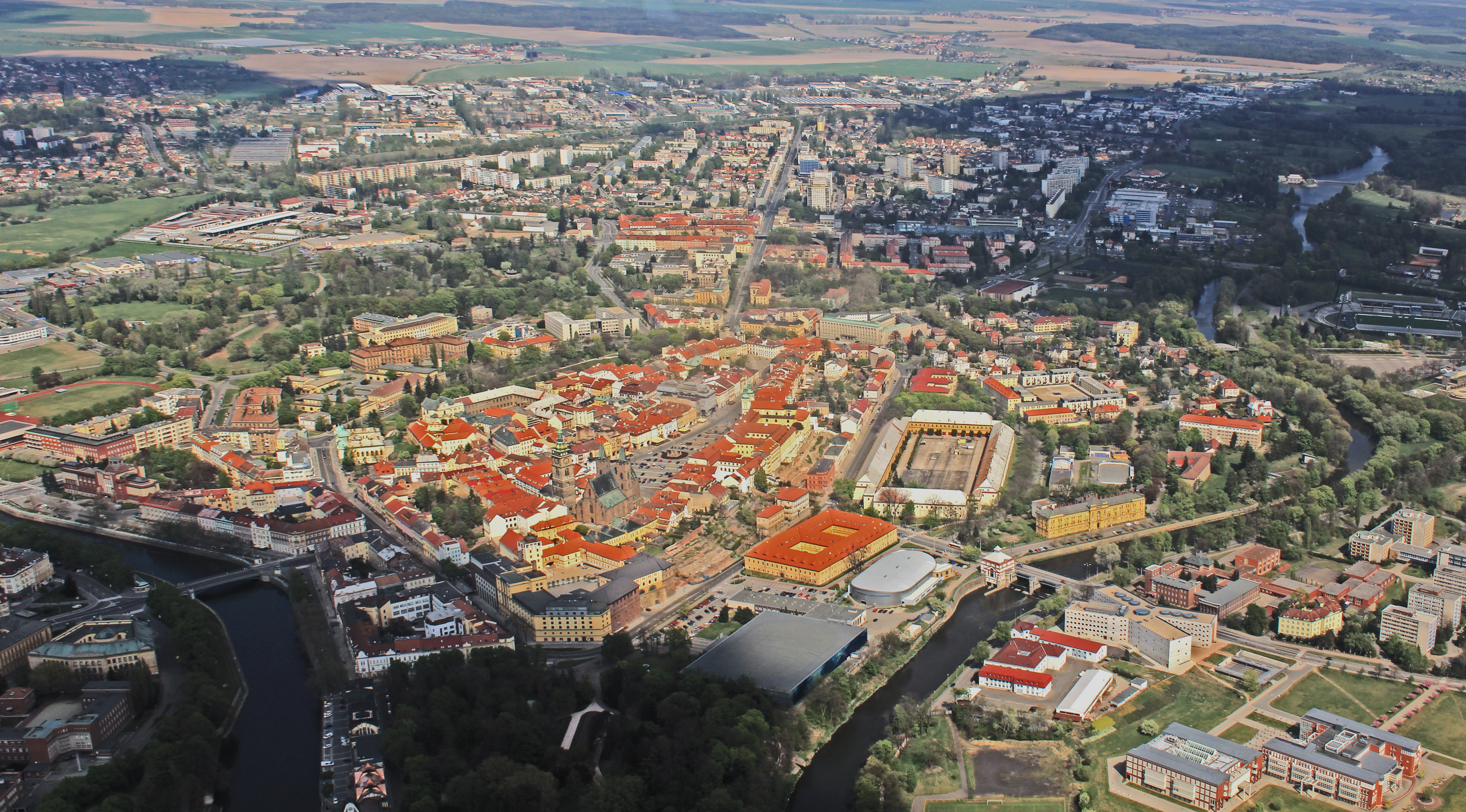
Hradec Králové from air

- Adršpach-Teplice Rocks
- Broumov and its monastery
- Dvůr Králové Zoo
- Hradec Králové
- Josefov Fortress
- Kost Castle
- Krkonoše National Park
- Prachov Rocks
- Probošt's mechanical Christmas crib
- Ratibořice Chateau

== Photo gallery ==
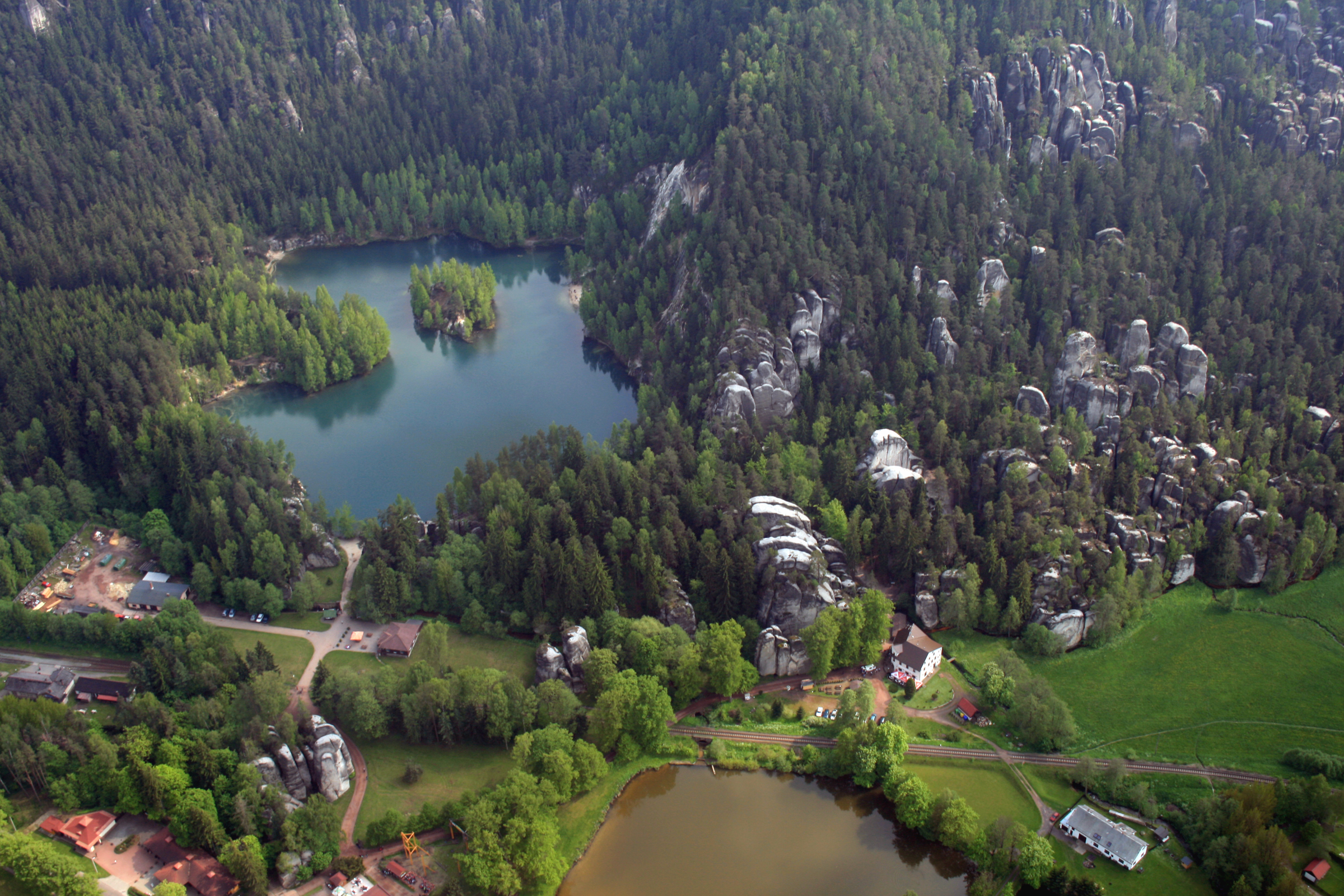
Adršpach-Teplice Rocks from a bird's-eye view

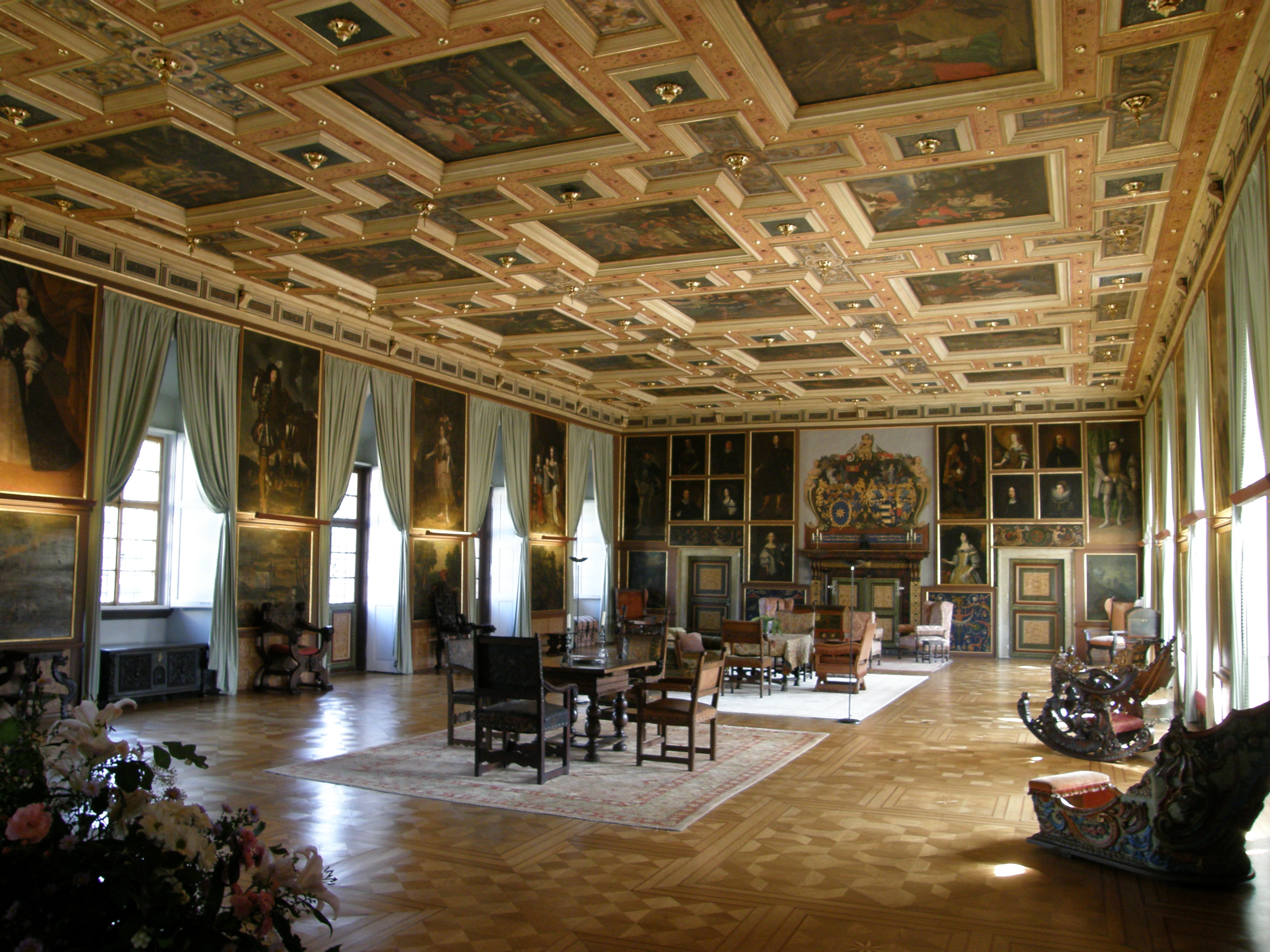
Knight's hall in Častolovice castle

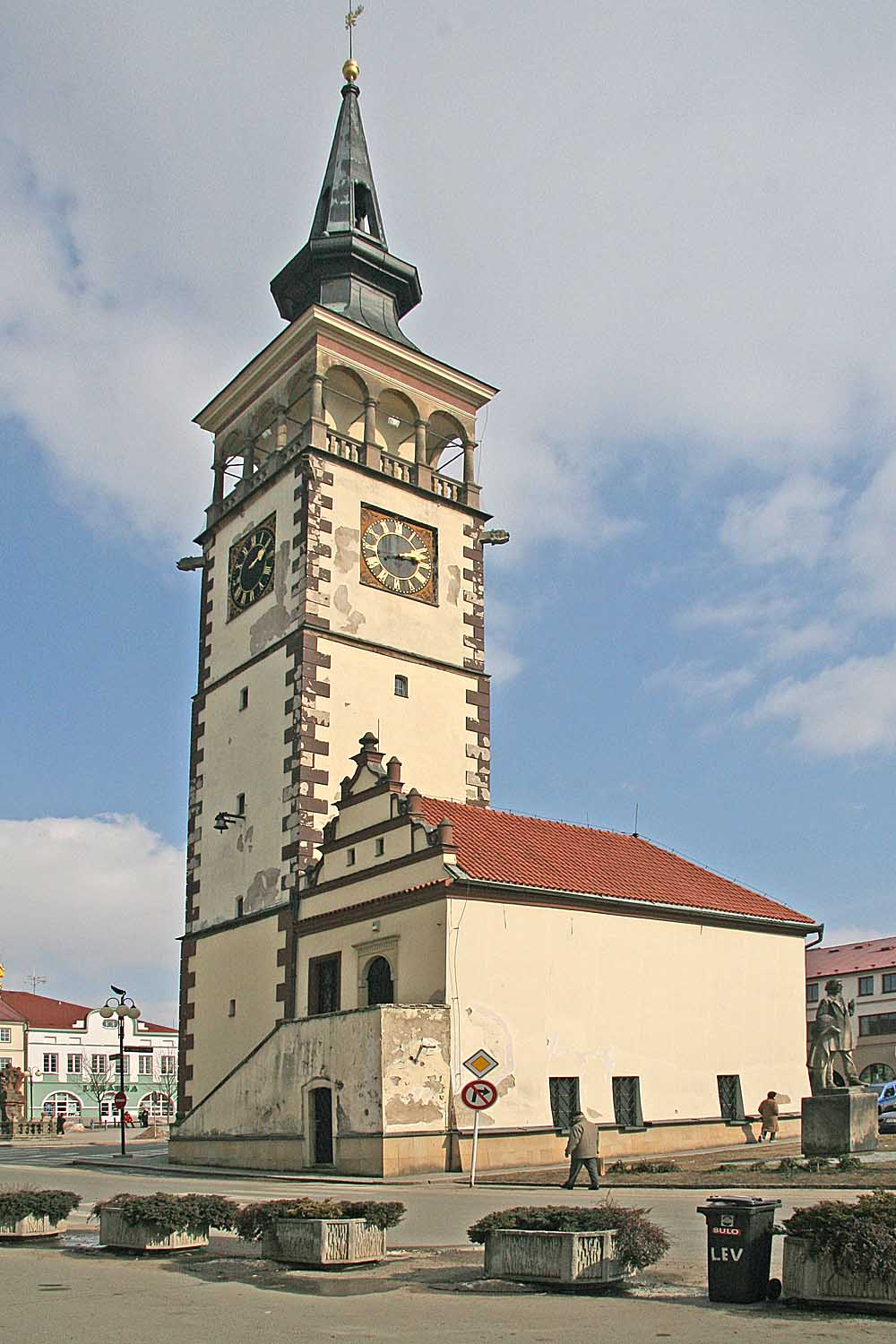
Dobruška

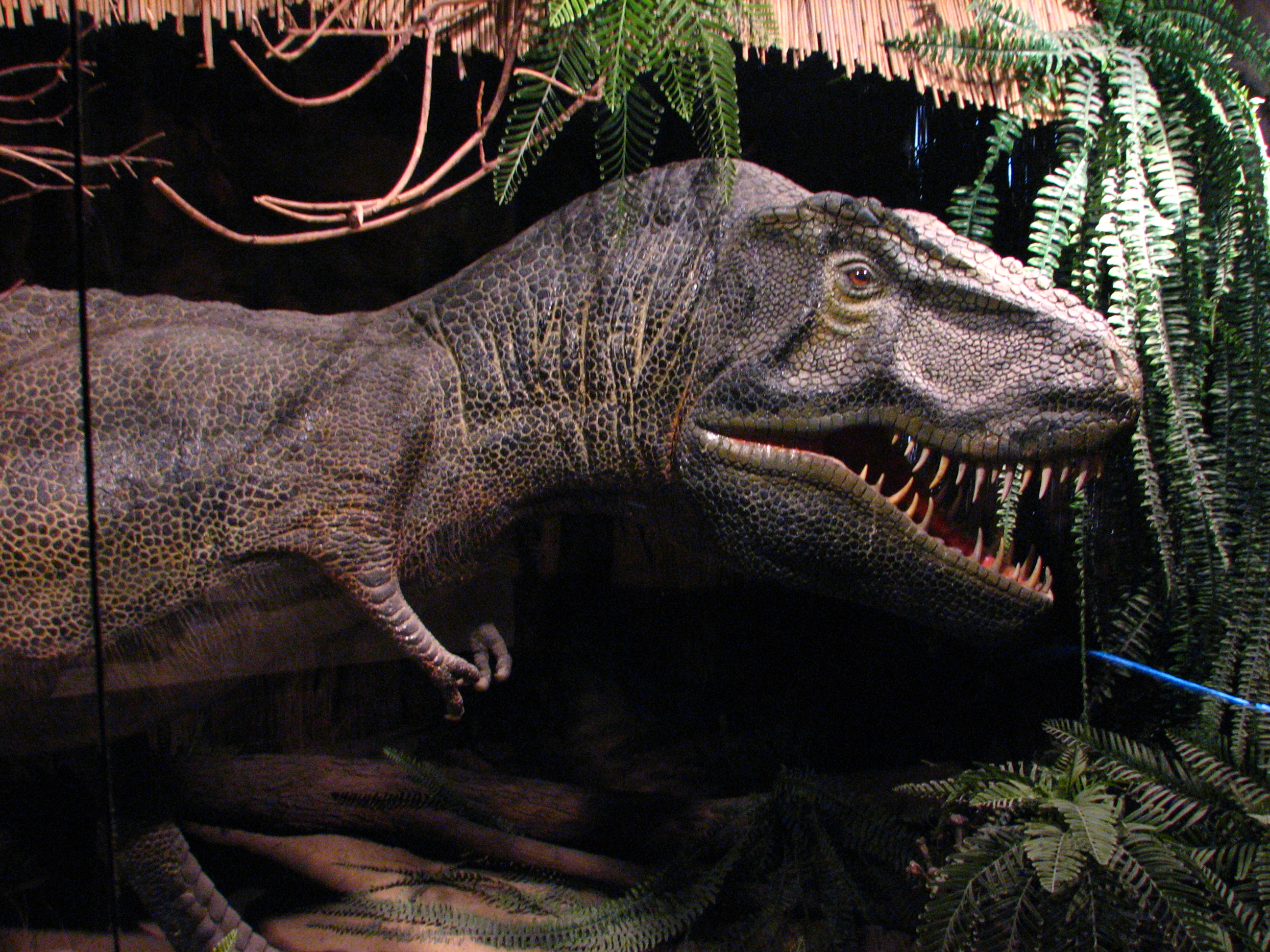
Dvůr Králové Zoo

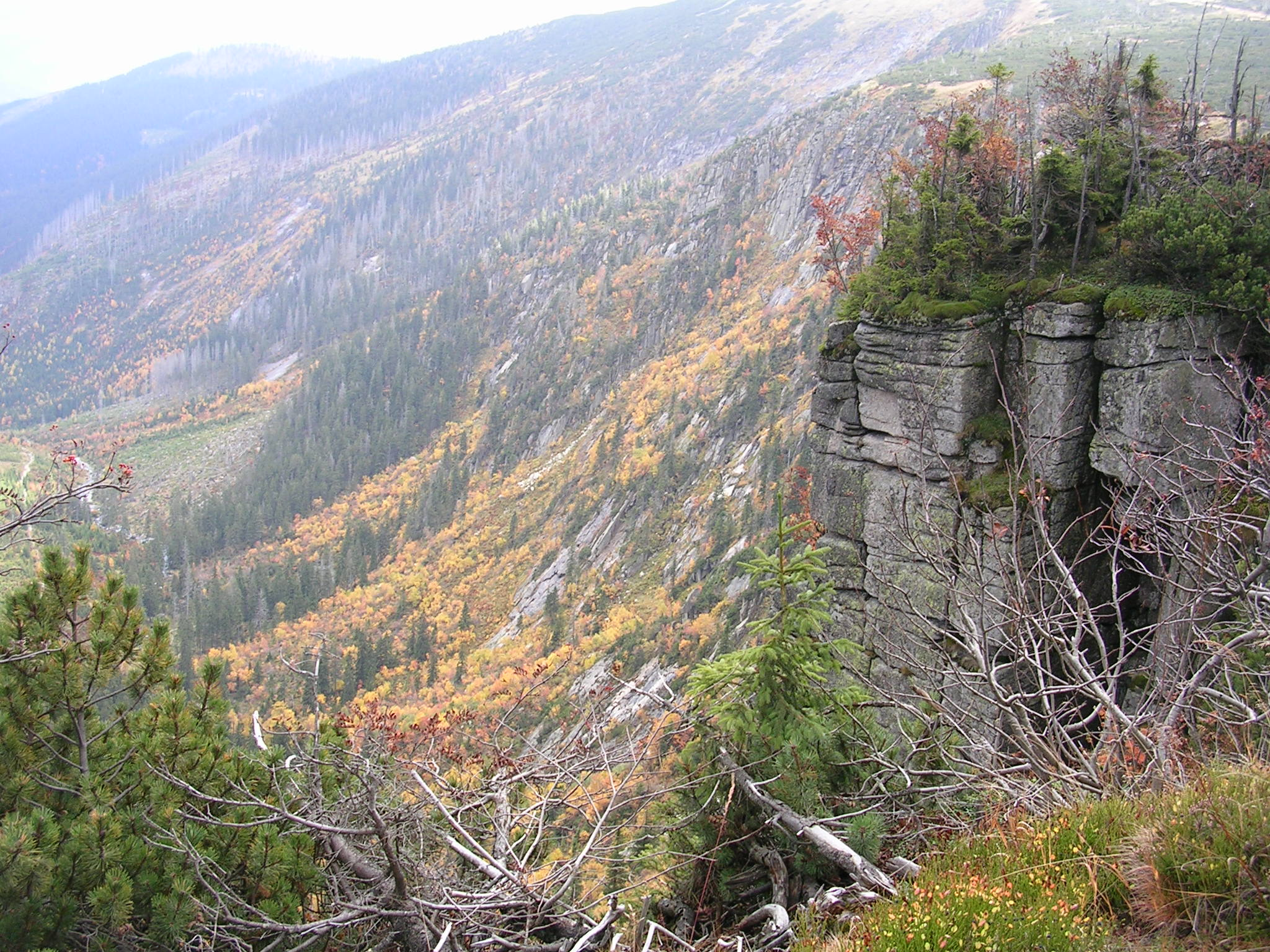
The Elbe valley

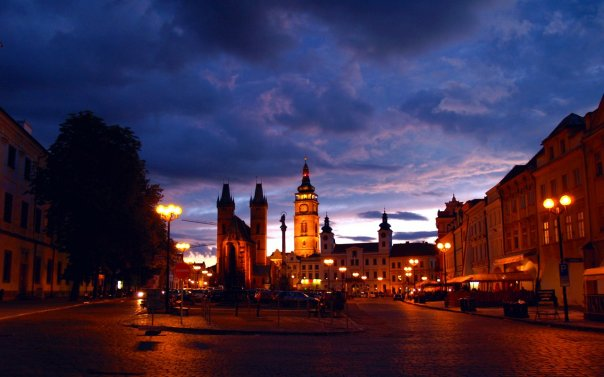
Hradec Králové

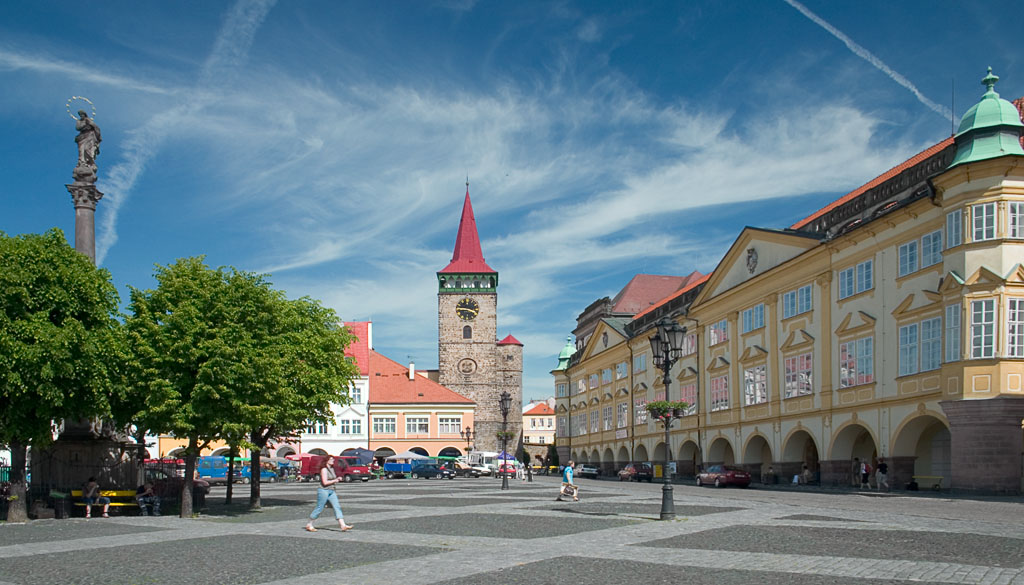
Jičín

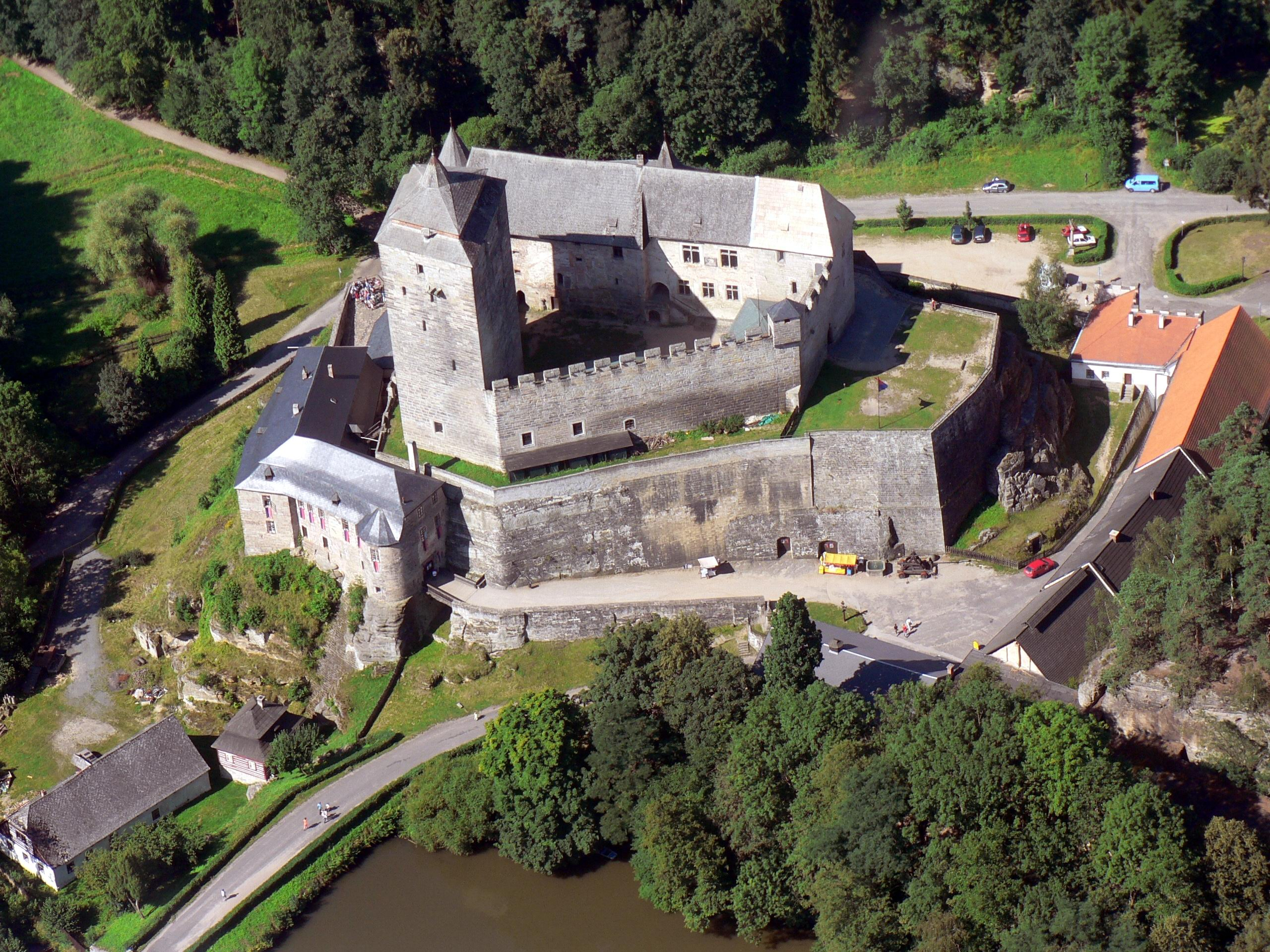
Kost Castle

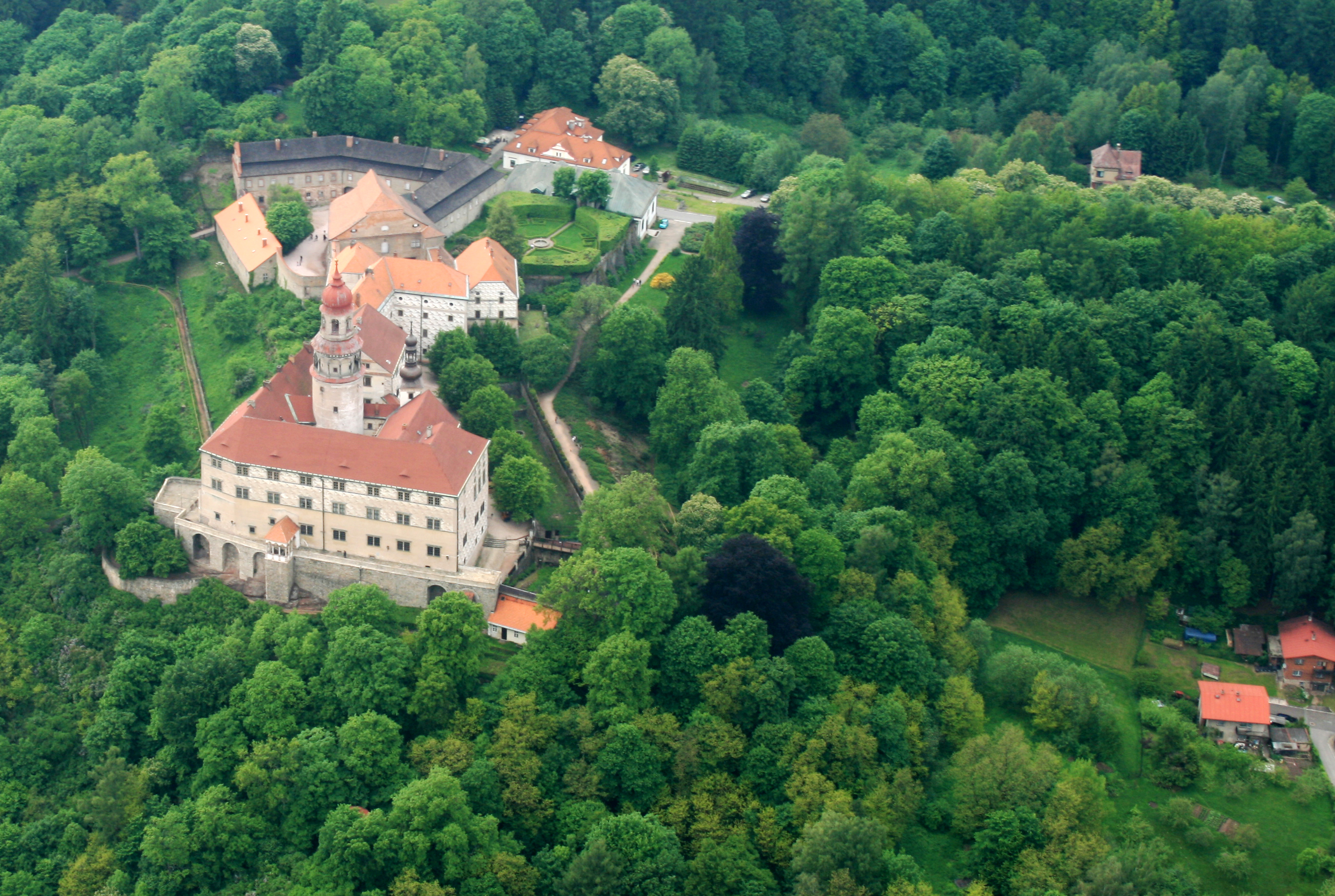
Castle in Náchod

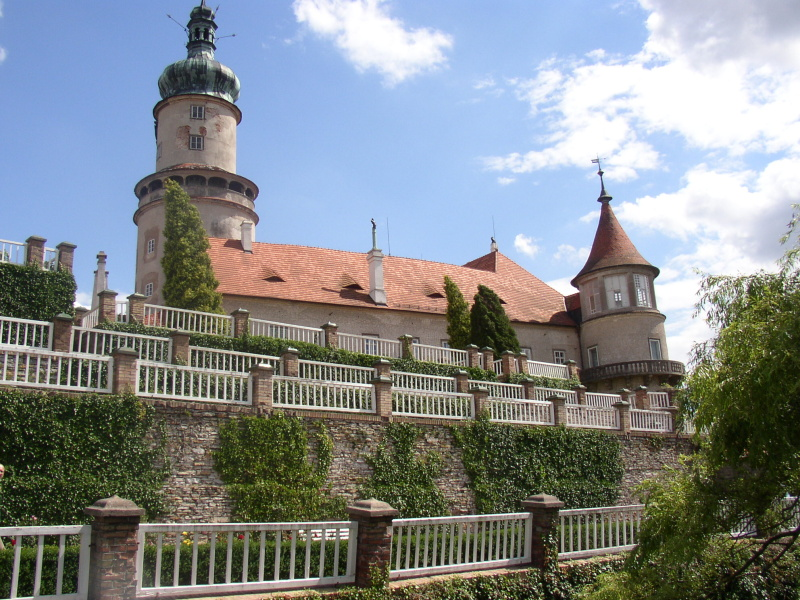
Nové Město nad Metují

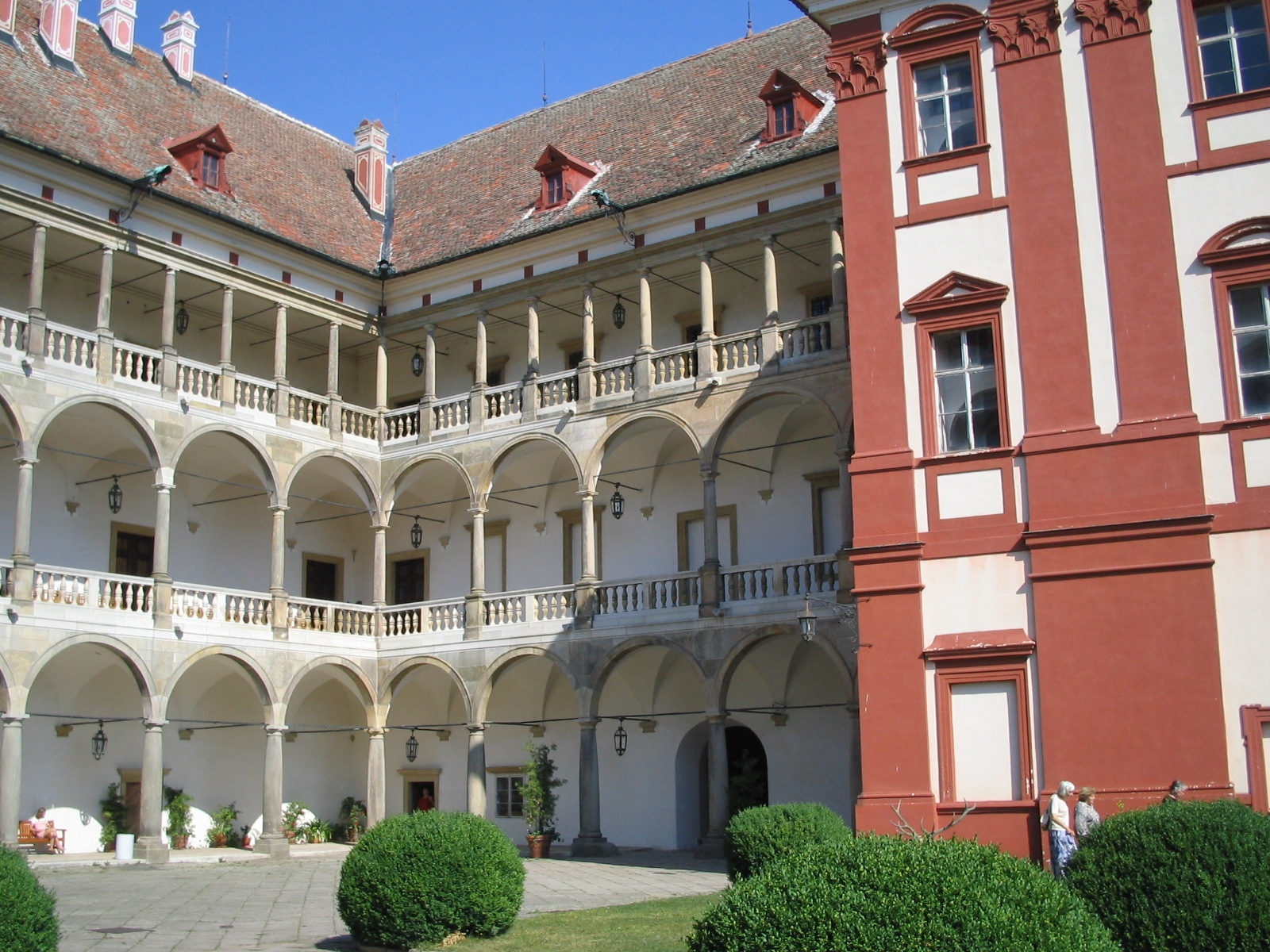
Castle in Opočno

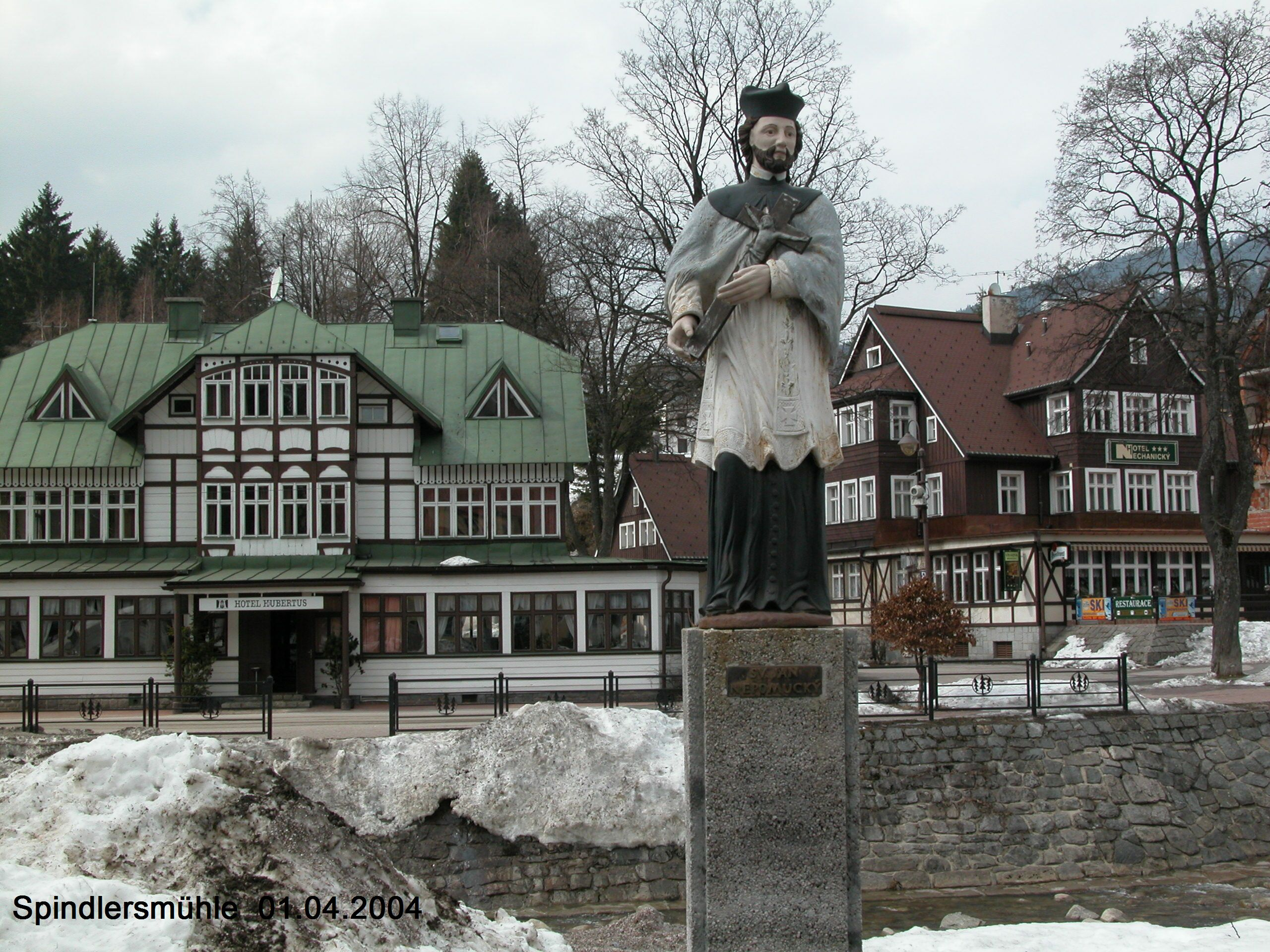
Špindlerův Mlýn
