= Bystřice (Cidlina) =

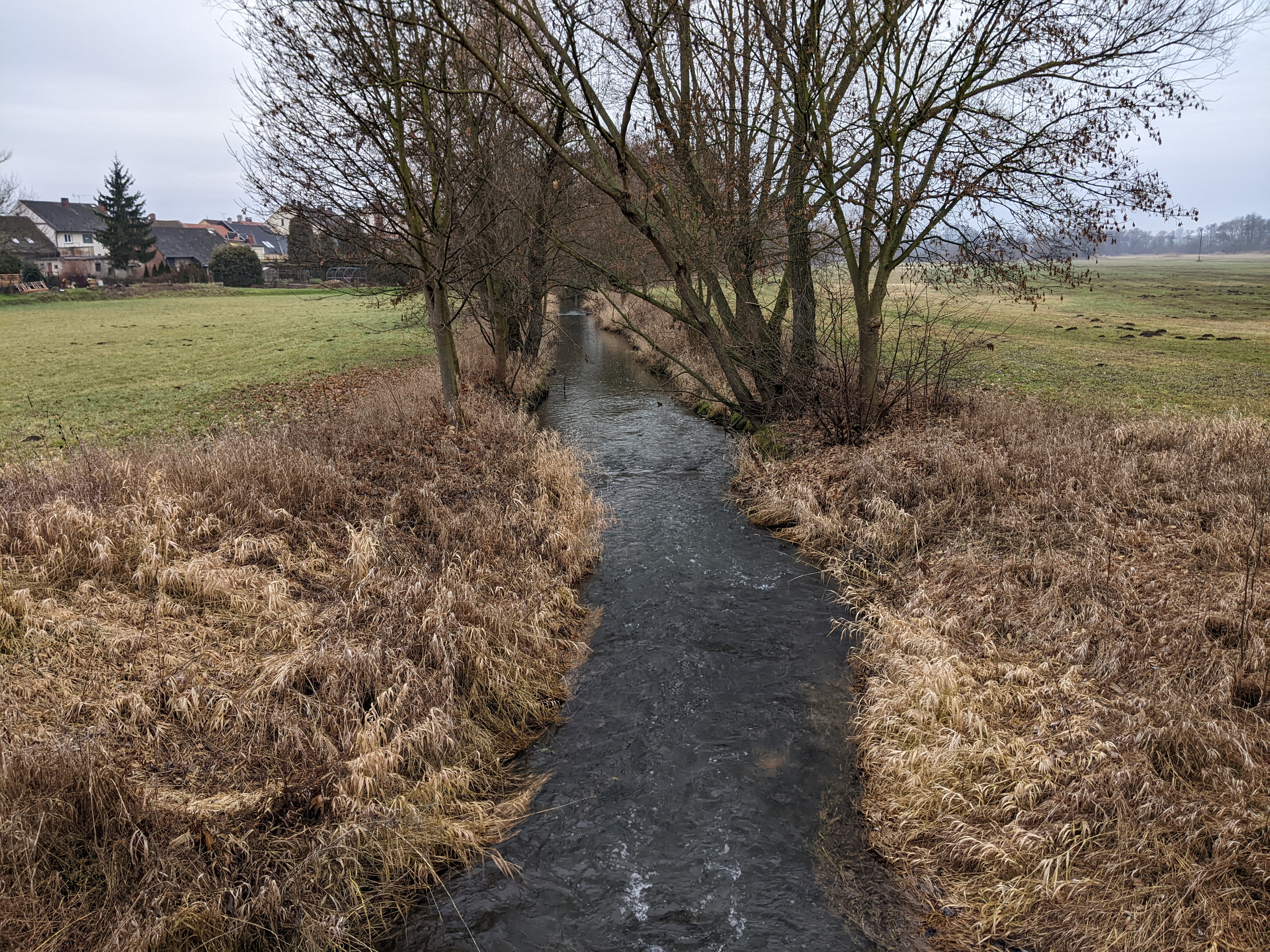
- The Bystřice near Nechanice

Location
- Country: Czech Republic
- Region: Hradec Králové

Physical characteristics
- Source
  - location: Horní Brusnice, Giant Mountains Foothills
  - coordinates: 50°28′45″N 15°39′32″E
  - elevation: 481 m (1,578 ft)
- Mouth
  - location: Cidlina
  - coordinates: 50°8′59″N 15°27′59″E
  - elevation: 214 m (702 ft)
- Length: 62.7 km (39.0 mi)
- Basin size: 379.2 km^{2} (146.4 sq mi)
- Discharge
  - average: 1.55 m^{3}/s (55 cu ft/s) near estuary

Basin features
- Progression: Cidlina→ Elbe→ North Sea

The Bystřice (Czech pronunciation: [ˈbɪstr̝̊ɪtsɛ]) is a river in the Czech Republic, a left tributary of the Cidlina River. It flows through the Hradec Králové and Central Bohemian regions. It is 62.7 km (39.0 mi) long.

== Etymology ==
The name of the river is derived from the Czech word bystrá, which used to mean 'fast-flowing', 'rapid'.

== Characteristic ==
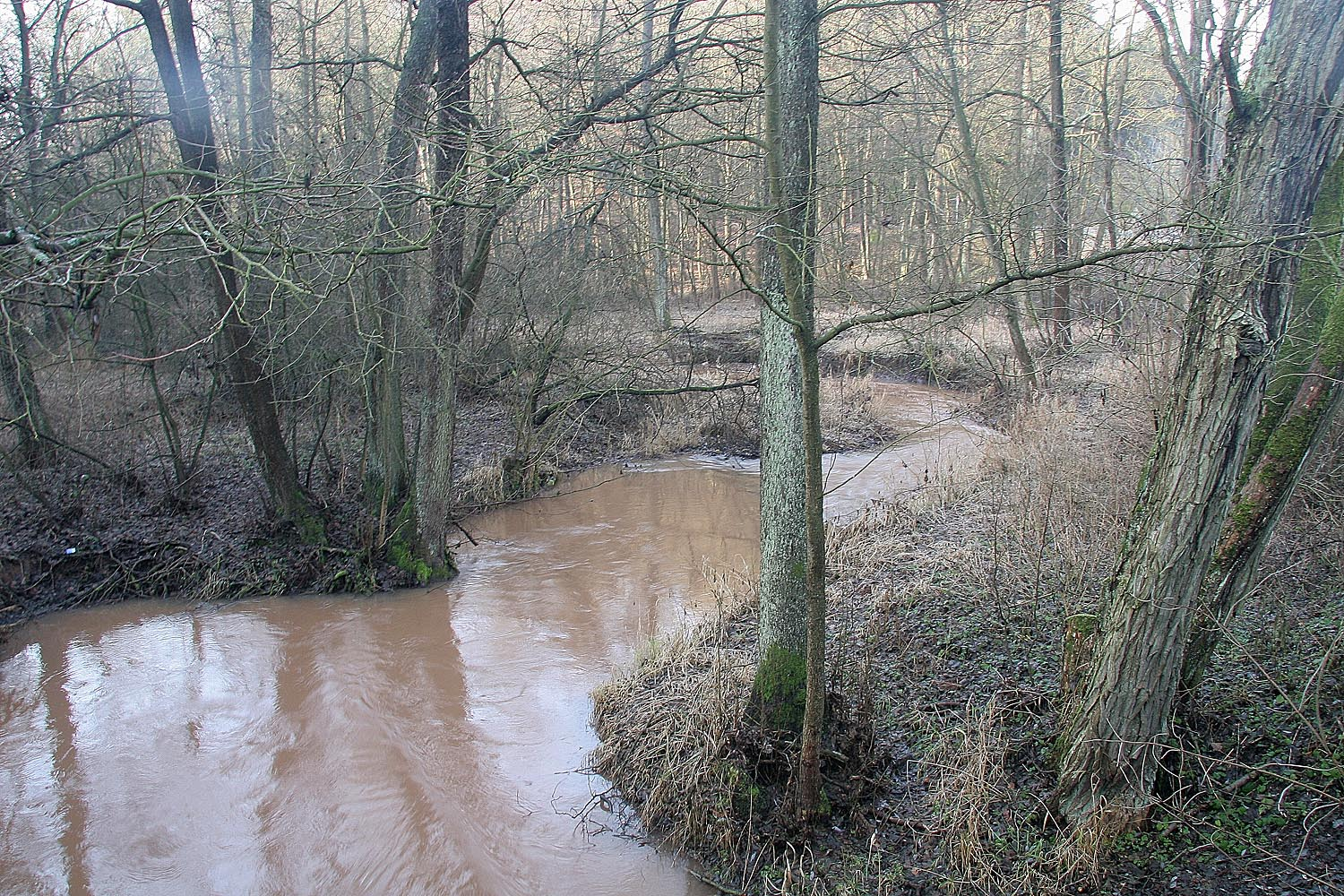
Údolí Bystřice nature monument near Hořice

The Bystřice originates in the territory of Horní Brusnice in the Giant Mountains Foothills at an elevation of 481 m (1,578 ft) and flows to Chlumec nad Cidlinou, where it enters the Cidlina River at an elevation of 214 m (702 ft). The river is 62.7 km (39.0 mi) long. Its drainage basin has an area of 379.2 km^{2} (146.4 sq mi).

The longest tributaries of the Bystřice are:

Tributary	Length (km)	Side
Bašnický potok	18.4	right
Radostovský potok	13.0	left
Třesický potok	10.9	left
Starovodský potok	9.0	left

== Course ==
The largest town around which the river flows is Hořice. The river flows through the municipal territories of Horní Brusnice, Pecka, Borek, Tetín, Miletín, Rohoznice, Červená Třemešná, Hořice, Jeřice, Cerekvice nad Bystřicí, Hněvčeves, Benátky, Sovětice, Sadová, Dohalice, Mžany, Mokrovousy, Třesovice, Nechanice, Kunčice, Boharyně, Puchlovice, Roudnice, Kratonohy, Kosičky, Kosice, Písek, Nové Město and Chlumec nad Cidlinou.

== Bodies of water ==
There are 377 bodies of water in the basin area. The largest of them is the Třesický pond with an area of 37 ha (91 acres). There are no fishponds or reservoirs built directly on the Bystřice.

== Protection of nature ==
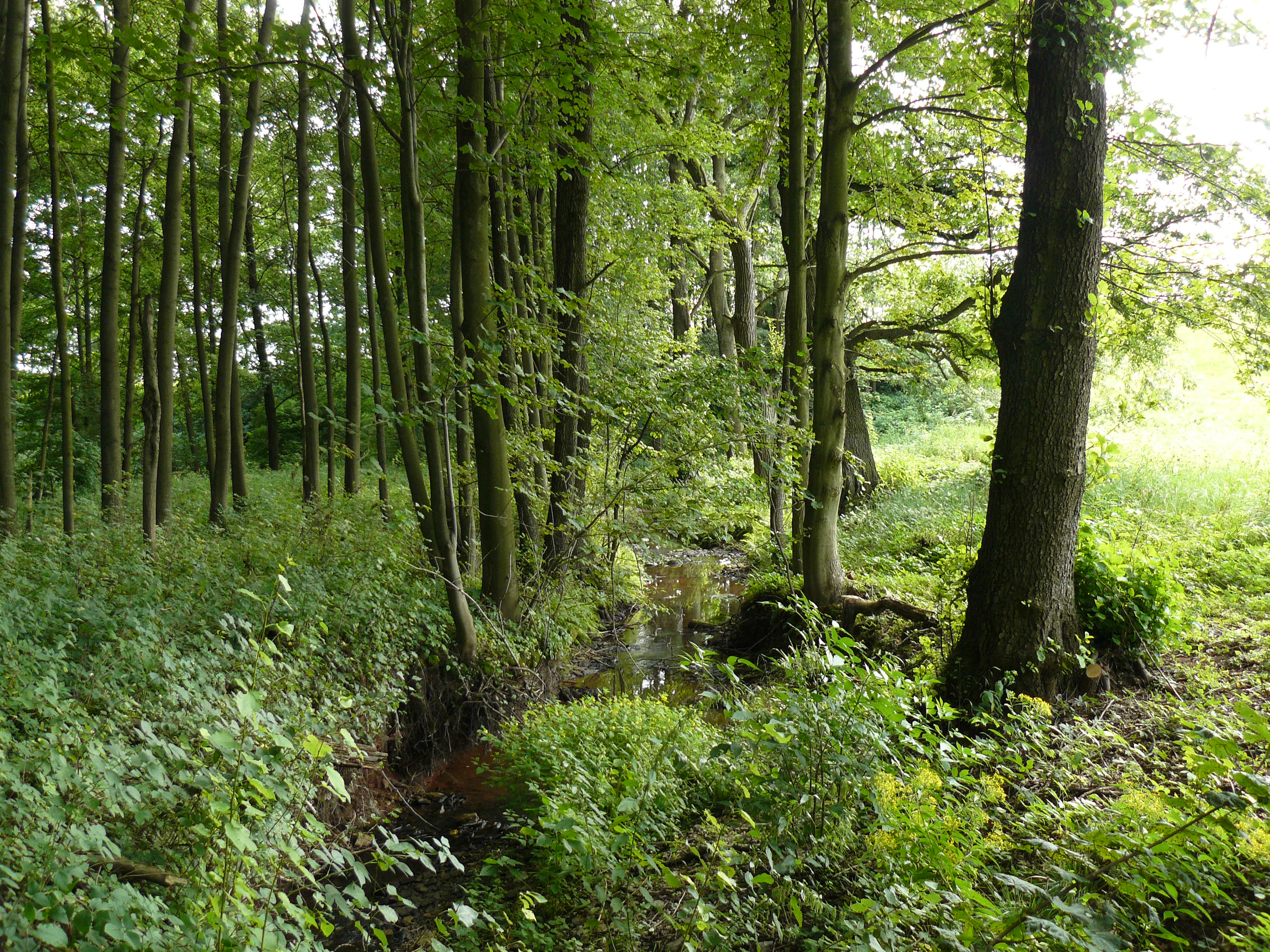
Kalské údolí nature monument

A survey conducted in 2010 showed that the Bystřice River was inhabited by a total of 21 species of aquatic molluscs, out of which 11 were gastropods and the remaining 10 were bivalves. Most of the recorded species were common ones. Although previous researches had shown the river to have an even higher number of species, the most notable find of the research in 2010 was the increase in the alien New Zealand mud snail and European physa species. On the other hand, there was also the discovery of the presence of the endangered thick shelled river mussel, with an increased population density of the species as compared to a few years ago. Due to the presence of the thick shelled river mussel, the river bed between Hořice and Boharyně is protected as a nature monument. It has an area of 27.8 ha (69 acres).

The river in the valley to the west of Hořice, along with its immediate surroundings, is protected as the Údolí Bystřice nature monument. It has an area of 17.8 ha (44 acres). The reason for the protection is the natural flow of the river, riparian vegetation and hygrophilous meadows with the occurrence of protected species of plants and animals.

The river valley on its upper course is protected as the Kalské údolí nature monument. It has an area of 22.9 ha (57 acres) and the reasons for protection are the same as in the case of Údolí Bystřice.

== See also ==
- List of rivers of the Czech Republic
