= Rohoznice =

Rohoznice may refer to places in the Czech Republic:

- Rohoznice (Jičín District), a municipality and village in the Hradec Králové Region
- Rohoznice (Pardubice District), a municipality and village in the Pardubice Region
