= Tetín =

Tetín may refer to places in the Czech Republic:

- Tetín (Beroun District), a municipality and village in the Central Bohemian Region
- Tetín (Jičín District), a municipality and village in the Hradec Králové Region
