= Třesovice =

- Municipality
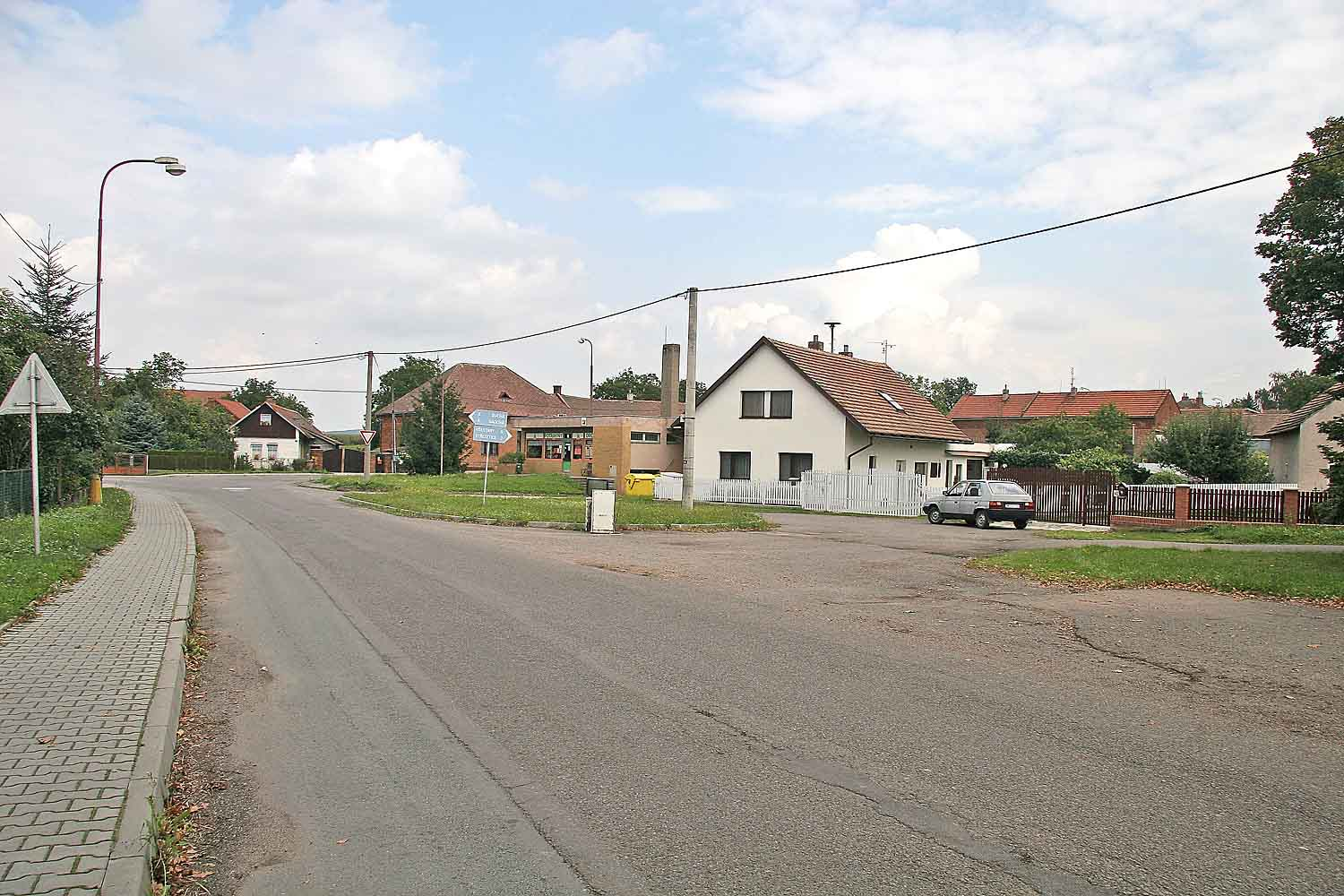
- Centre of Třesovice

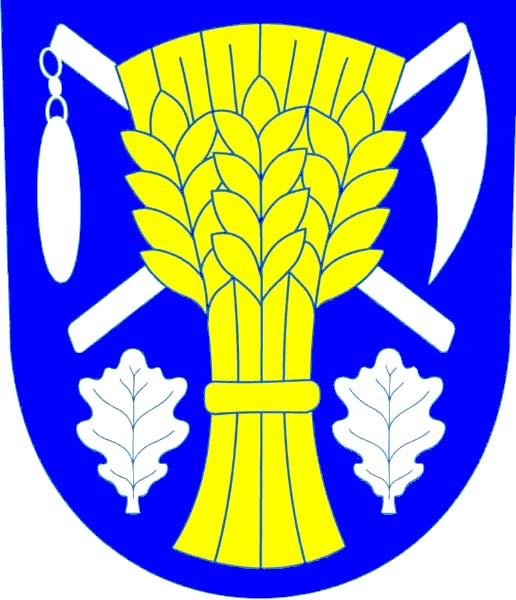
- Flag Coat of arms

- Location in the Czech Republic
- Coordinates: 50°10′23″N 15°44′22″E
- Country: Czech Republic
- Region: Hradec Králové
- District: Hradec Králové
- First mentioned: 1412

Area
  - Total: 4.73 km^{2} (1.83 sq mi)
- Elevation: 253 m (830 ft)

Population (2026-01-01)
  - Total: 272
  - Density: 57.5/km^{2} (149/sq mi)
- Time zone: UTC+1 (CET)
  - Summer (DST): UTC+2 (CEST)
- Postal code: 503 15
- Website: www.obectresovice.cz

Třesovice (German: Tresowitz) is a municipality and village in Hradec Králové District in the Hradec Králové Region of the Czech Republic. It has about 300 inhabitants.

== Administrative division ==
Třesovice consists of two municipal parts (in brackets population according to the 2021 census):

- Třesovice (205)
- Popovice (72)

== Etymology ==
The name Třesovice is derived either personal name Třes, meaning "the village of Třes' people", or from the Old Czech word třesení ('fear'), meaning "the village of frightened people".

== Geography ==
Třesovice is located about 10 kilometres (6 mi) northwest of Hradec Králové. It lies in a flat agrictulral landscape of the East Elbe Table. The municipality is situated on the left bank of the Bystřice River.

== History ==
The first written mention of Třesovice is from 1412, Popovice was first mentioned in 1398. Třesovice was probably founded in the 11th or 12th century. From the 13th century, it was owned by the Minorite monastery of St. George in Hradec Králové. After the monastery was destroyed during the Hussite Wars, Třesovice was acquired by Diviš Bořek of Miletínek, then it changed owners many times. The most notable owners of the village were the Schaffgotsch family, who held it from 1707 to 1788. In 1829, Třesovice was bought by the Harrach family and annexed to the Sadová estate.

== Demographics ==
Historical population

Year	Pop.	±%
1869	657	—
1880	743	+13.1%
1890	684	−7.9%
1900	639	−6.6%
1910	571	−10.6%

Year	Pop.	±%
1921	563	−1.4%
1930	505	−10.3%
1950	415	−17.8%
1961	412	−0.7%
1970	347	−15.8%

Year	Pop.	±%
1980	322	−7.2%
1991	254	−21.1%
2001	235	−7.5%
2011	248	+5.5%
2021	277	+11.7%

Source: Censuses

== Transport ==
There are no railways or major roads passing through the municipality.

== Sights ==
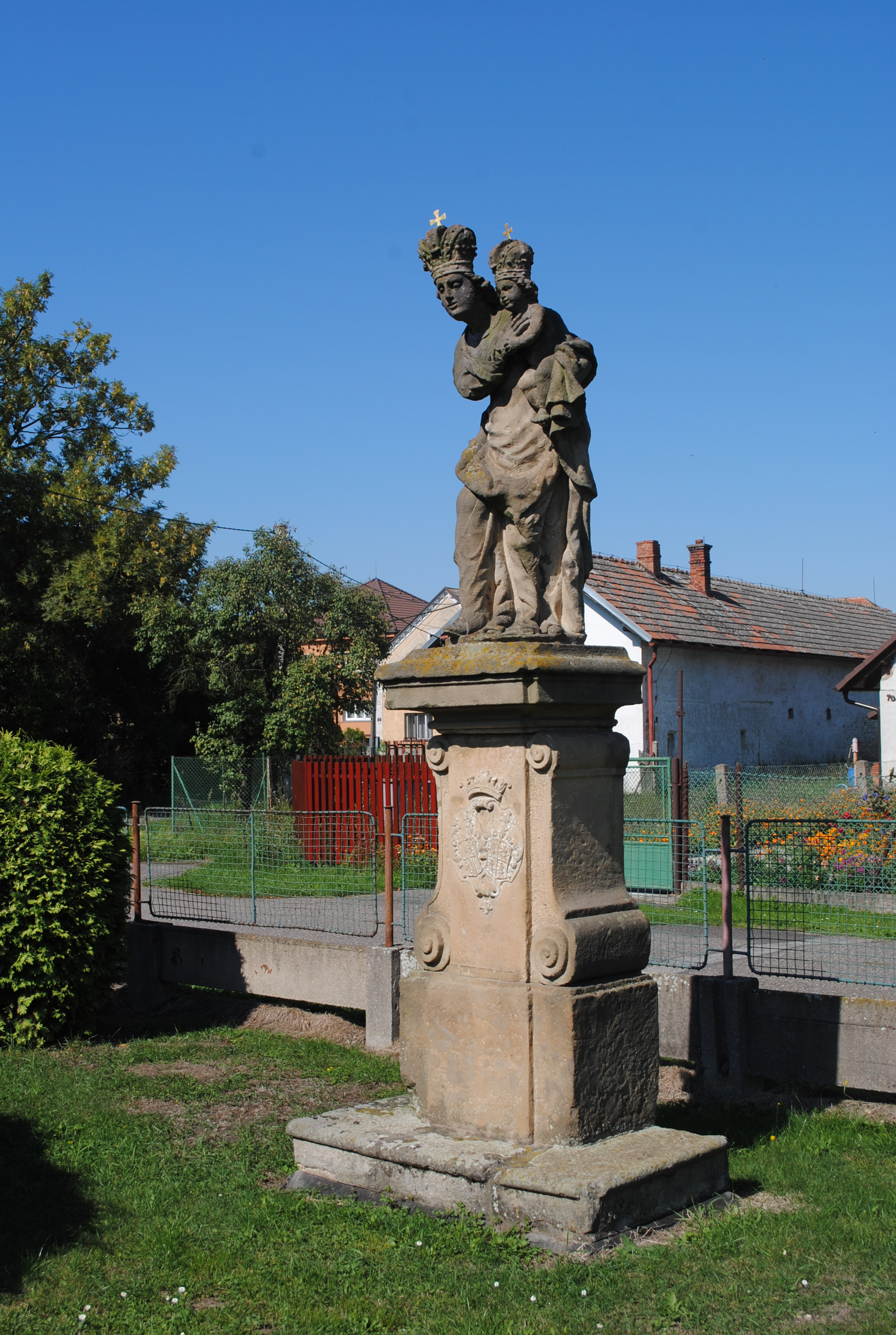
Statue of the Virgin Mary with Christ Child

The only protected cultural monument in the municipality is a Baroque sandstone statue of the Virgin Mary with Christ Child, dating from around 1700.

An architectural monument of Popovice is the old wooden mill on the Bystřice River. Next to the mill stands a memorable oak whose age is estimated to be more than 600 years old.
