= Jeřice =

- Municipality
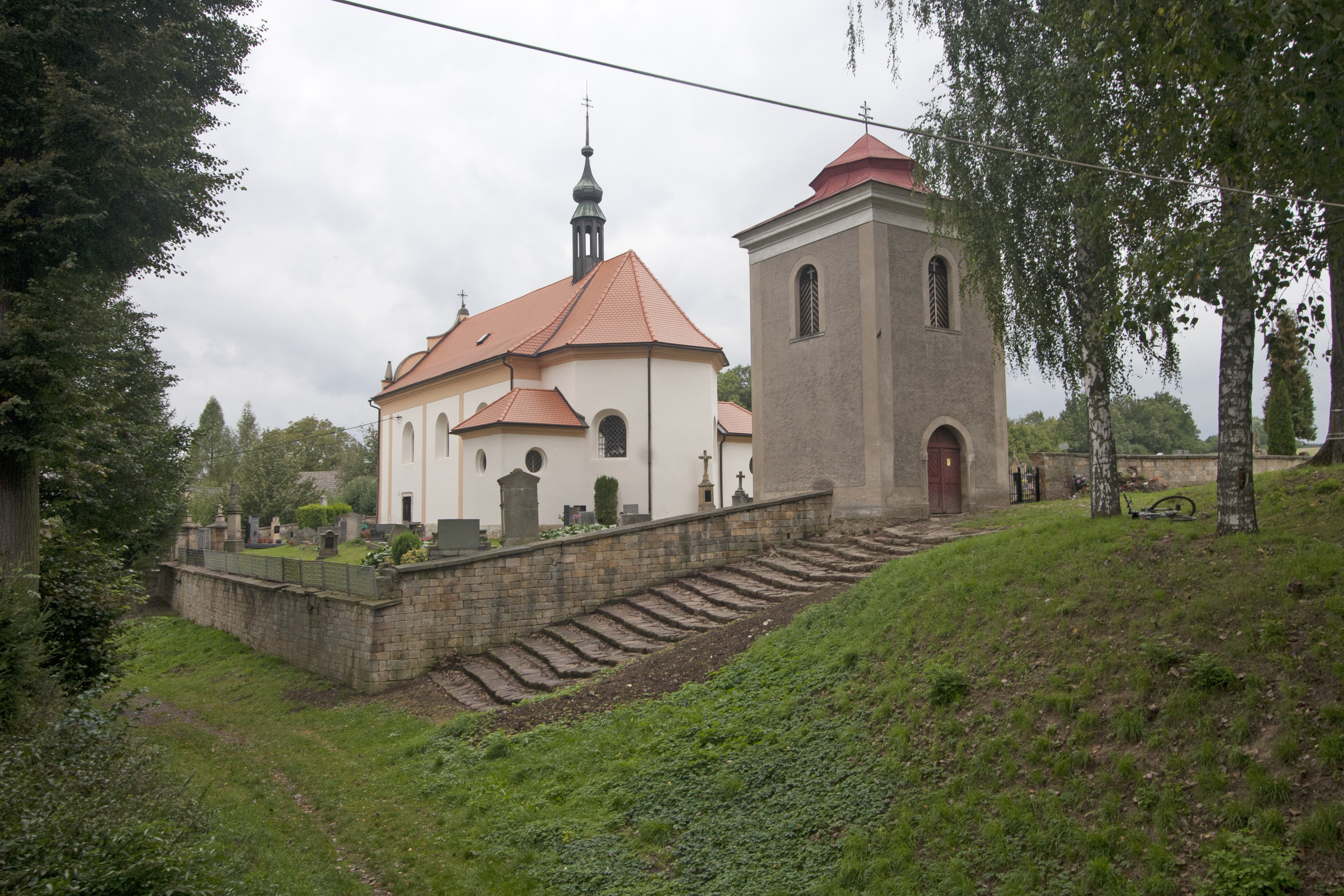
- Church of Saint Mary Magdalene

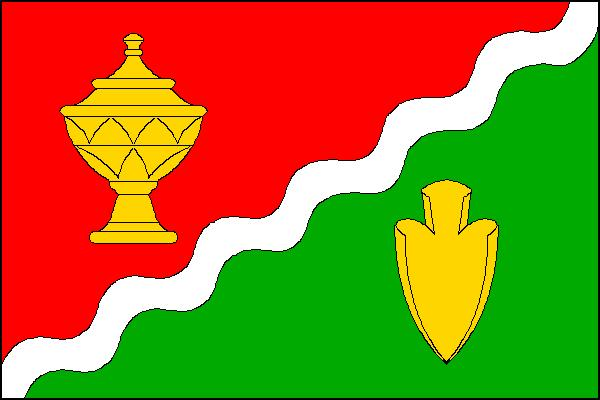
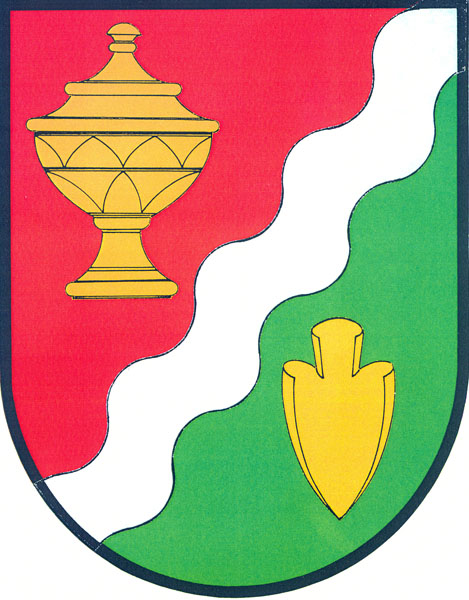
- Flag Coat of arms

- Location in the Czech Republic
- Coordinates: 50°20′41″N 15°40′51″E
- Country: Czech Republic
- Region: Hradec Králové
- District: Jičín
- First mentioned: 1379

Area
  - Total: 6.91 km^{2} (2.67 sq mi)
- Elevation: 279 m (915 ft)

Population (2026-01-01)
  - Total: 383
  - Density: 55.4/km^{2} (144/sq mi)
- Time zone: UTC+1 (CET)
  - Summer (DST): UTC+2 (CEST)
- Postal code: 508 01
- Website: www.obecjerice.cz

Jeřice (German: Jerschitz) is a municipality and village in Jičín District in the Hradec Králové Region of the Czech Republic. It has about 400 inhabitants.

== Administrative division ==
Jeřice consists of two municipal parts (in brackets population according to the 2021 census):

- Jeřice (292)
- Dolní Černůtky (93)

== Etymology ==
The name Jeřice is derived from the personal name Jaro (a shortened form of Jaroslav), meaning "the village of Jaro's people".

== Geography ==
Jeřice is located about 25 kilometres (16 mi) southeast of Jičín and 18 km (11 mi) northwest of Hradec Králové. It lies mostly in a flat agricultural landscape in the East Elbe Table. The northern part of the municipality extends into the Jičín Uplands and includes the highest point of Jeřice at 325 m (1,066 ft) above sea level. The Bystřice River flows through the municipality.

== History ==
The first written mention of Jeřice is from 1379. The owners of Jeřice often changed and included various lesser noblemen. In 1665–1748, Jeřice was a property of the Hilprandt family. They had rebuilt the local fortress into a Baroque castle.

== Demographics ==
Historical population

Year	Pop.	±%
1869	717	—
1880	762	+6.3%
1890	751	−1.4%
1900	738	−1.7%
1910	678	−8.1%

Year	Pop.	±%
1921	667	−1.6%
1930	662	−0.7%
1950	487	−26.4%
1961	492	+1.0%
1970	458	−6.9%

Year	Pop.	±%
1980	431	−5.9%
1991	385	−10.7%
2001	370	−3.9%
2011	395	+6.8%
2021	385	−2.5%

Source: Censuses

== Transport ==
Jeřice is located on the railway line Hradec Králové–Turnov.

== Sights ==
The main landmark of Jeřice is the Church of Saint Mary Magdalene, built in the Gothic style. Next to the church is a separate late Baroque bell tower.

The Jeřice Castle was originally a Gothic fortress from the 14th century, rebuilt into a Baroque castle. Late Baroque modifications took place in 1760–1780. In 1886, the interior was rebuilt in the Neo-Renaissance style. The castle is surrounded by a landscape park. Today it is privately owned and inaccessible to the public.
