= Benátky (Hradec Králové District) =

- Municipality
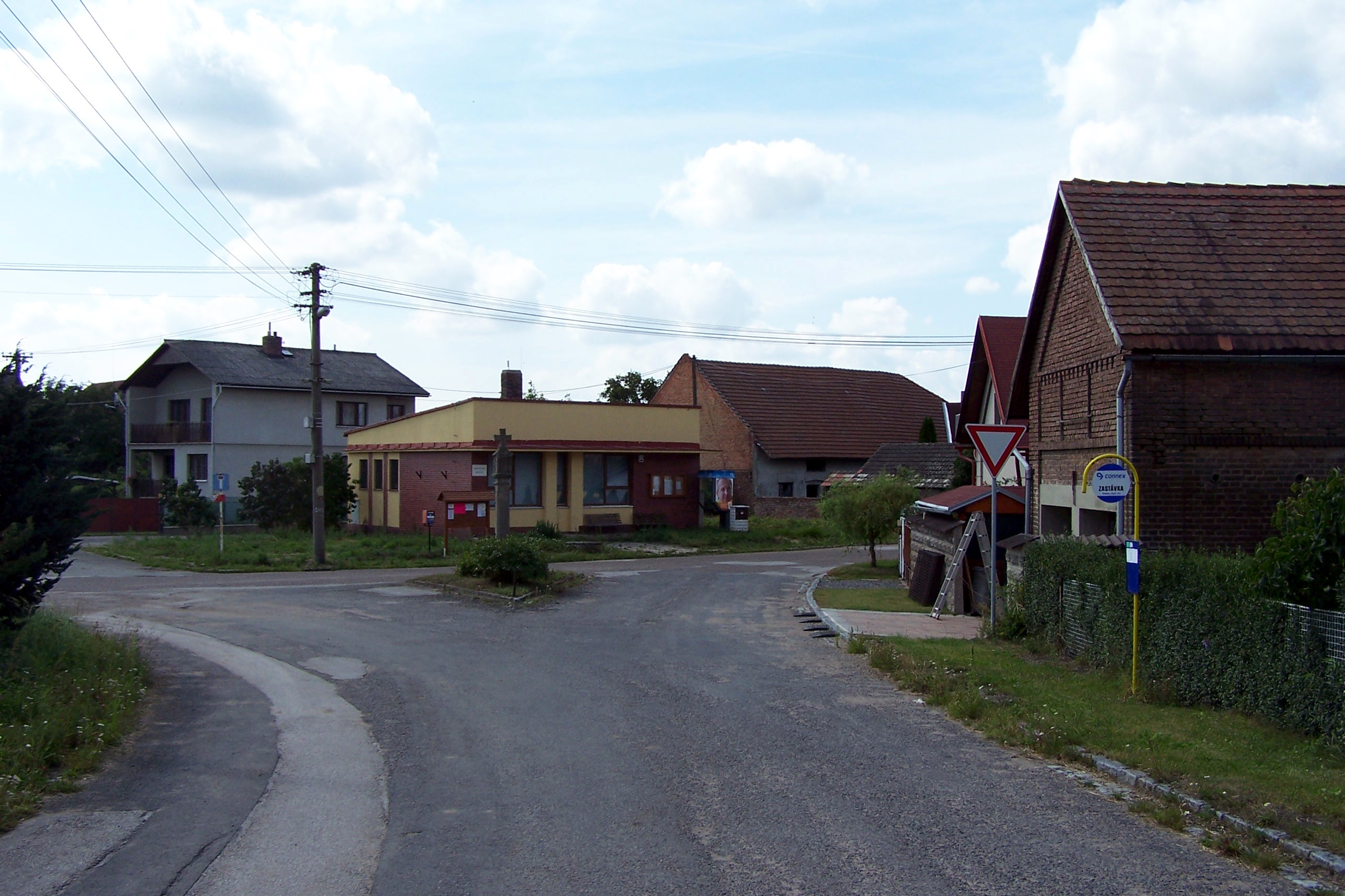
- Centre of Benátky

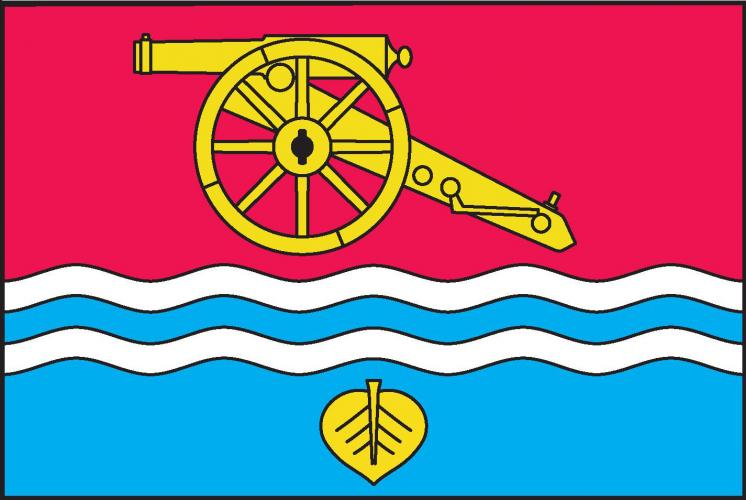
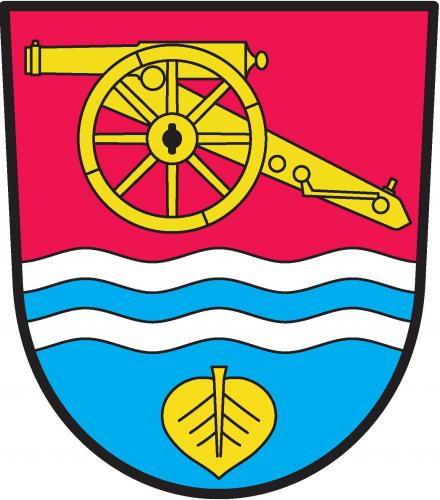
- Flag Coat of arms

- Location in the Czech Republic
- Coordinates: 50°18′37″N 15°44′10″E
- Country: Czech Republic
- Region: Hradec Králové
- District: Hradec Králové
- First mentioned: 1241

Area
  - Total: 3.61 km^{2} (1.39 sq mi)
- Elevation: 274 m (899 ft)

Population (2026-01-01)
  - Total: 124
  - Density: 34.3/km^{2} (89.0/sq mi)
- Time zone: UTC+1 (CET)
  - Summer (DST): UTC+2 (CEST)
- Postal code: 503 03
- Website: oubenatky.cz

Benátky is a municipality and village in Hradec Králové District in the Hradec Králové Region of the Czech Republic. It has about 100 inhabitants.

== Etymology ==
Benátky is the Czech exonym for Venice. Several settlements in Bohemia founded near rivers and on wet marshy places were named this way, which is also the case of this settlement.

== Geography ==
Benátky is located about 12 kilometres (7 mi) northwest of Hradec Králové. It lies in a flat agricultural landscape in the East Elbe Table. The Bystřice River flows along the western municipal border.

== History ==
The first written mention of Benátky is from 1241, when it became property of the Teutonic Order. Then the village was owned by the Opatovice Monastery. After the monastery was burned down in 1421 by the Hussites, Benátky was held by various noble families and often changed owners. In 1493–1547, Benátky was owned by the Pernštejn family. In 1547, the village was bought by the Trčka of Lípa family, who annexed it to the Smiřice estate.

== Demographics ==
Historical population

Year	Pop.	±%
1869	262	—
1880	282	+7.6%
1890	293	+3.9%
1900	289	−1.4%
1910	263	−9.0%

Year	Pop.	±%
1921	276	+4.9%
1930	265	−4.0%
1950	169	−36.2%
1961	172	+1.8%
1970	161	−6.4%

Year	Pop.	±%
1980	118	−26.7%
1991	92	−22.0%
2001	97	+5.4%
2011	109	+12.4%
2021	120	+10.1%

Source: Censuses

== Transport ==
There are no major roads passing through the municipality. The railway that runs through Benátky is unused.

== Sights ==
The only protected cultural monument in the municipality is a stone column shrine, which dates from the second half of the 16th century. It is a unique example of a column shrine from the Renaissance period.

The municipality is partly located in the area of the battlefield of the Battle of Königgrätz, which is protected as a landscape monument zone.
