= Cerekvice nad Bystřicí =

- Municipality
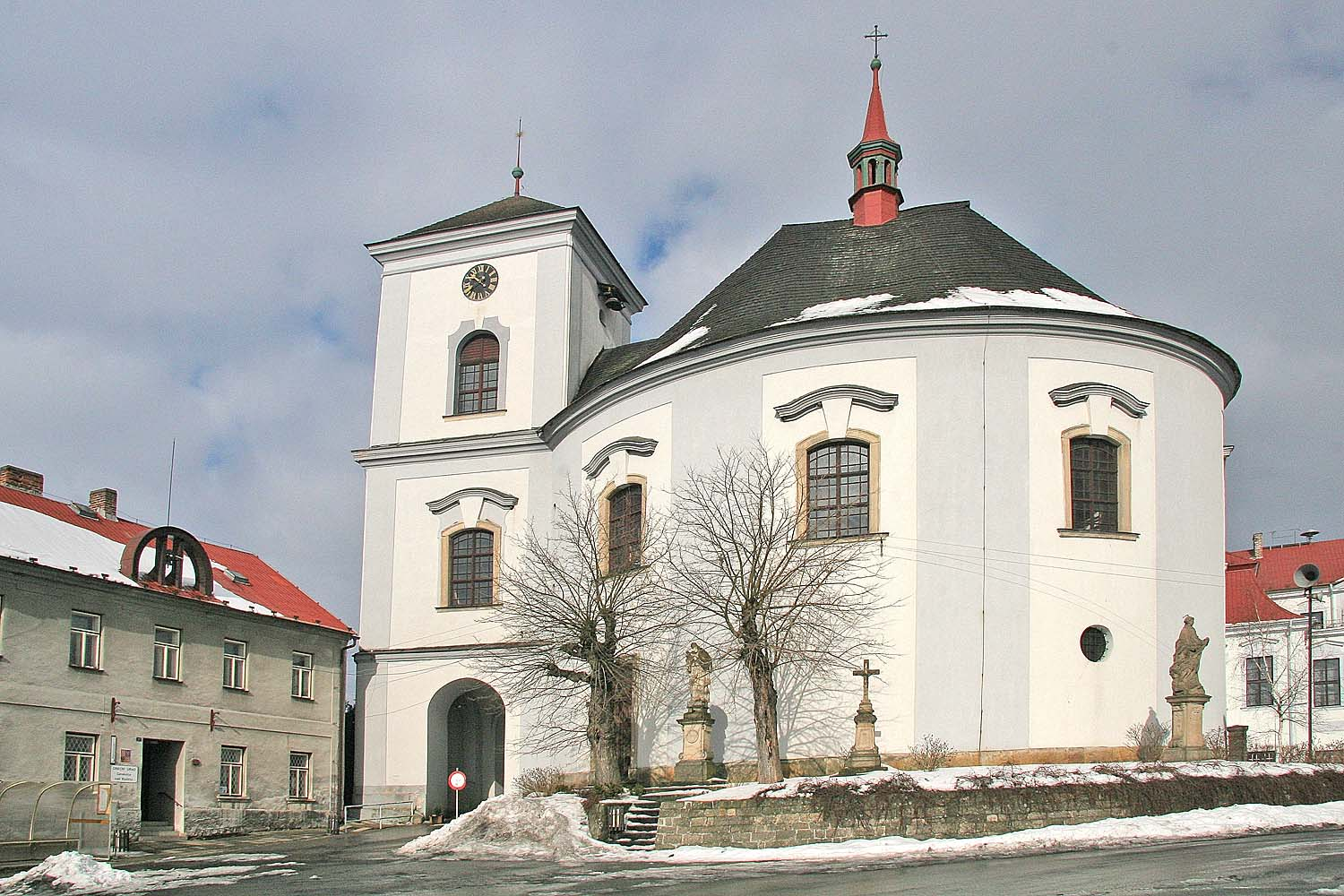
- Church of the Annunciation

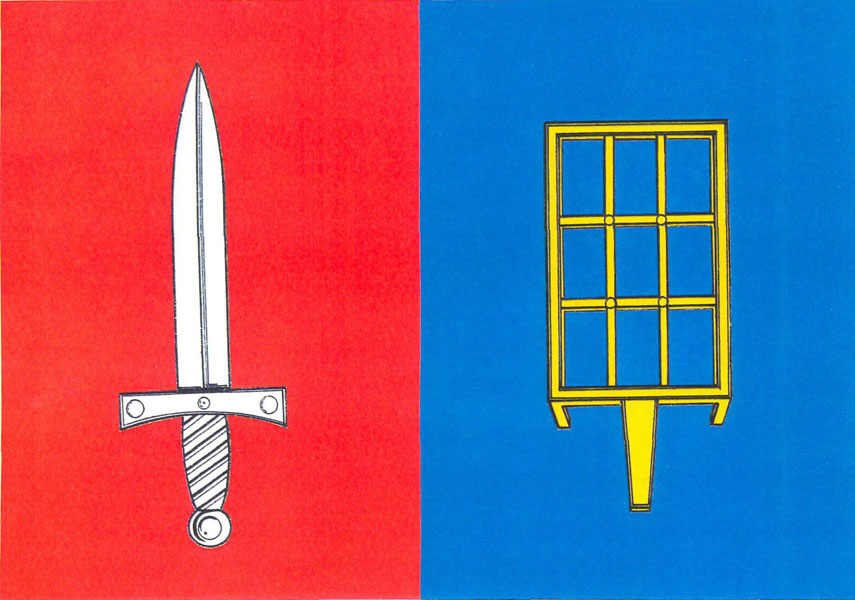
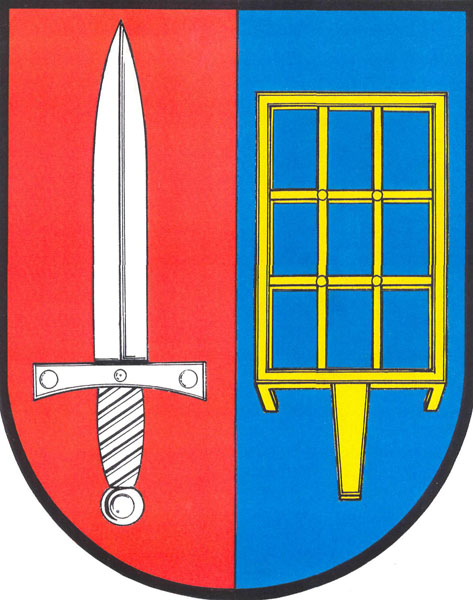
- Flag Coat of arms

- Location in the Czech Republic
- Coordinates: 50°20′0″N 15°43′25″E
- Country: Czech Republic
- Region: Hradec Králové
- District: Jičín
- First mentioned: 1357

Area
  - Total: 8.29 km^{2} (3.20 sq mi)
- Elevation: 279 m (915 ft)

Population (2026-01-01)
  - Total: 805
  - Density: 97.1/km^{2} (252/sq mi)
- Time zone: UTC+1 (CET)
  - Summer (DST): UTC+2 (CEST)
- Postal codes: 507 77, 508 01
- Website: www.cerekvice.cz

Cerekvice nad Bystřicí is a municipality and village in Jičín District in the Hradec Králové Region of the Czech Republic. It has about 800 inhabitants.

== Administrative division ==
Cerekvice nad Bystřicí consists of three municipal parts (in brackets population according to the 2021 census):

- Cerekvice nad Bystřicí (581)
- Čenice 2.díl (5)
- Třebovětice (193)

== Demographics ==
Historical population
Year	Pop.	±%
1869	1,300	—
1880	1,288	−0.9%
1890	1,153	−10.5%
1900	1,121	−2.8%
1910	990	−11.7%
1921	998	+0.8%
1930	956	−4.2%
1950	739	−22.7%
1961	784	+6.1%
1970	691	−11.9%
1980	594	−14.0%
1991	540	−9.1%
2001	773	+43.1%
2011	765	−1.0%
2021	779	+1.8%
Source: Censuses
