= Červená Třemešná =

- Municipality
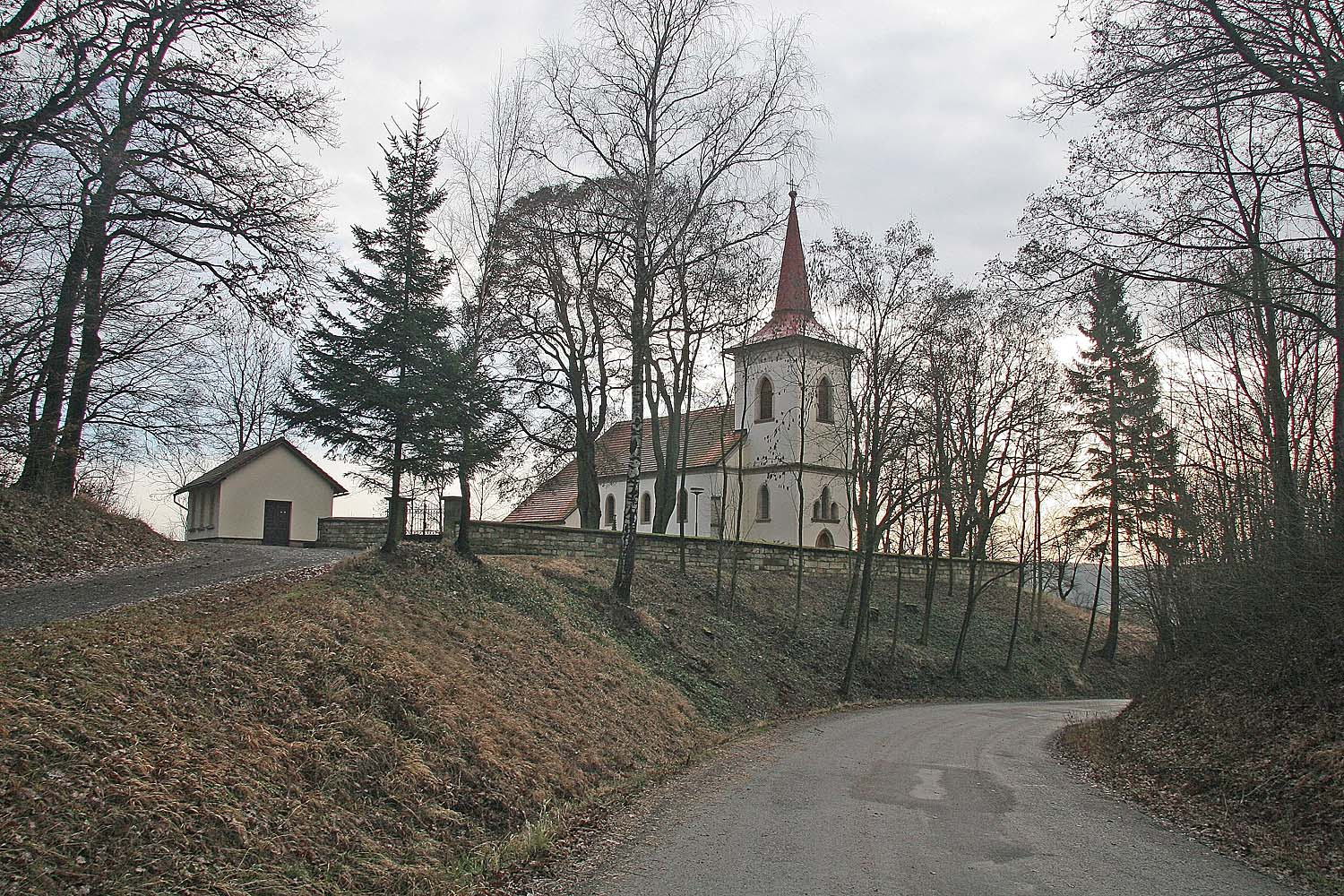
- Church of Saint James the Great

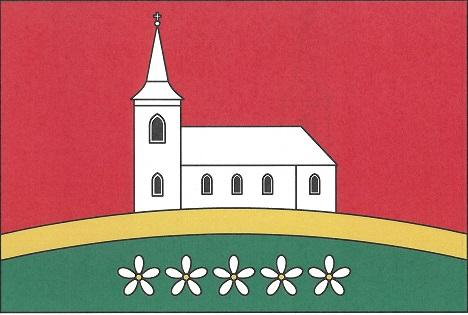
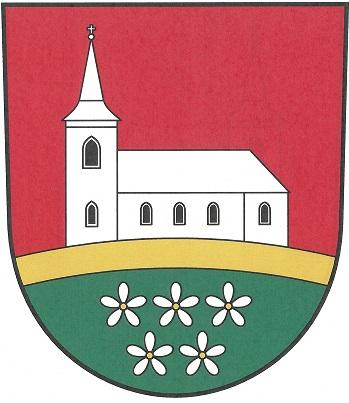
- Flag Coat of arms

- Location in the Czech Republic
- Coordinates: 50°23′58″N 15°38′37″E
- Country: Czech Republic
- Region: Hradec Králové
- District: Jičín
- First mentioned: 1267

Area
  - Total: 6.56 km^{2} (2.53 sq mi)
- Elevation: 326 m (1,070 ft)

Population (2026-01-01)
  - Total: 186
  - Density: 28.4/km^{2} (73.4/sq mi)
- Time zone: UTC+1 (CET)
  - Summer (DST): UTC+2 (CEST)
- Postal code: 508 01
- Website: www.cervenatremesna.cz

Červená Třemešná is a municipality and village in Jičín District in the Hradec Králové Region of the Czech Republic. It has about 200 inhabitants.

== Demographics ==
Historical population
Year	Pop.	±%
1869	322	—
1880	273	−15.2%
1890	319	+16.8%
1900	344	+7.8%
1910	300	−12.8%
1921	298	−0.7%
1930	288	−3.4%
1950	202	−29.9%
1961	172	−14.9%
1970	153	−11.0%
1980	148	−3.3%
1991	124	−16.2%
2001	131	+5.6%
2011	160	+22.1%
2021	160	+0.0%
Source: Censuses
