= Mžany =

- Municipality
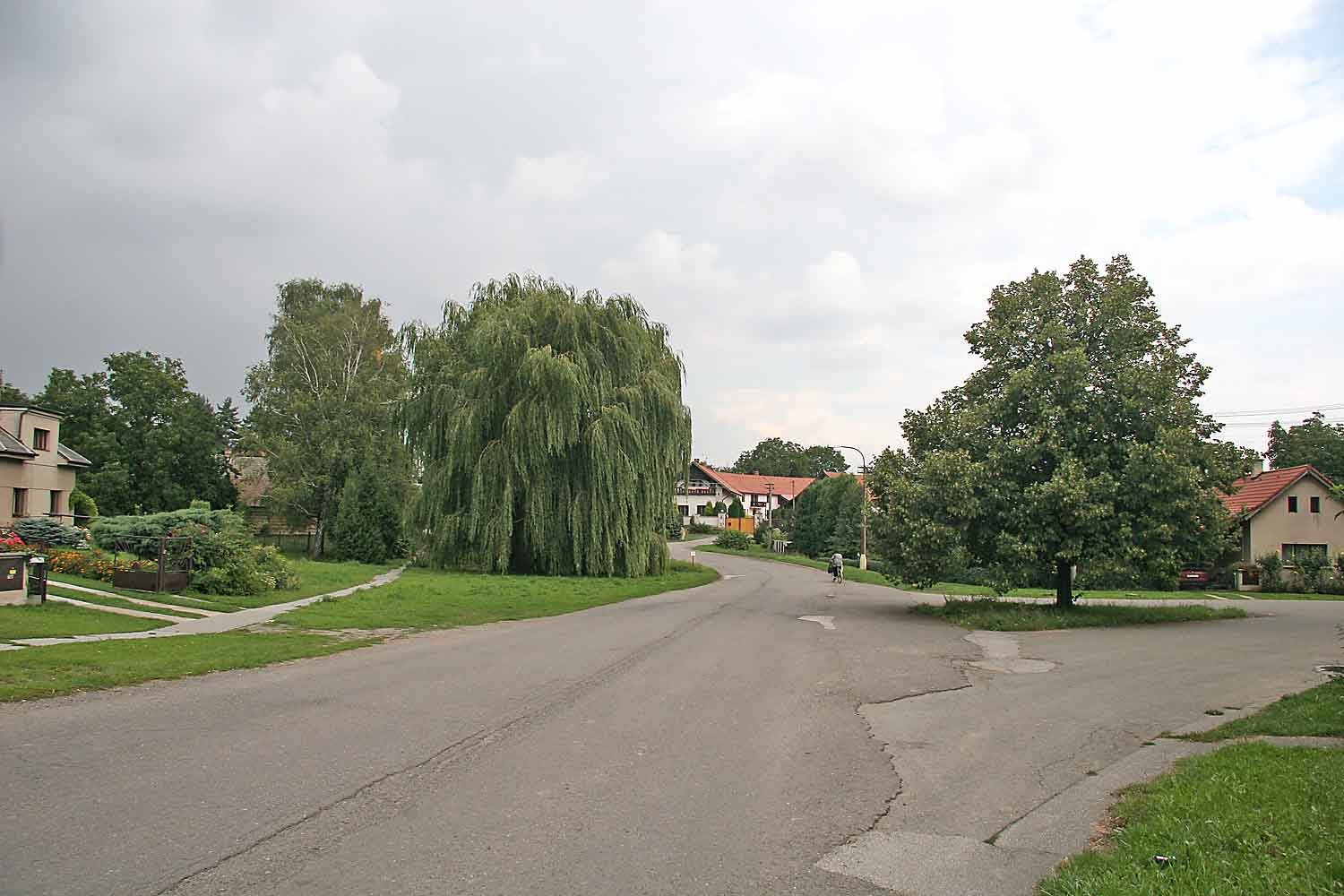
- Centre of Mžany

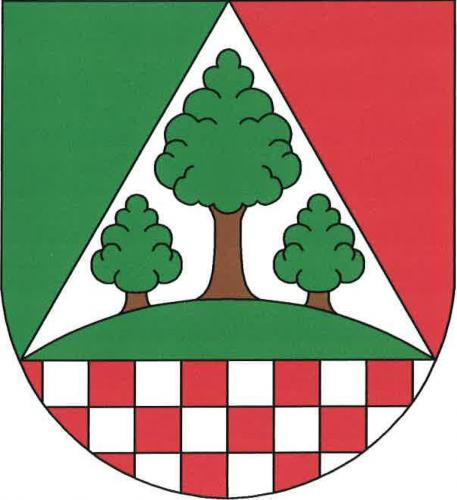
- Coat of arms

- Location in the Czech Republic
- Coordinates: 50°17′47″N 15°40′33″E
- Country: Czech Republic
- Region: Hradec Králové
- District: Hradec Králové
- First mentioned: 1404

Area
  - Total: 7.87 km^{2} (3.04 sq mi)
- Elevation: 272 m (892 ft)

Population (2026-01-01)
  - Total: 466
  - Density: 59.2/km^{2} (153/sq mi)
- Time zone: UTC+1 (CET)
  - Summer (DST): UTC+2 (CEST)
- Postal code: 503 15
- Website: www.mzany.cz

Mžany is a municipality and village in Hradec Králové District in the Hradec Králové Region of the Czech Republic. It has about 500 inhabitants.

== Administrative division ==
Mžany consists of three municipal parts (in brackets population according to the 2021 census):

- Mžany (257)
- Dub (49)
- Stračovská Lhota (104)

== Demographics ==
Historical population
Year	Pop.	±%
1869	911	—
1880	933	+2.4%
1890	933	+0.0%
1900	886	−5.0%
1910	887	+0.1%
1921	805	−9.2%
1930	787	−2.2%
1950	619	−21.3%
1961	563	−9.0%
1970	478	−15.1%
1980	411	−14.0%
1991	358	−12.9%
2001	406	+13.4%
2011	425	+4.7%
2021	410	−3.5%
Source: Censuses
