= Horní Brusnice =

- Municipality
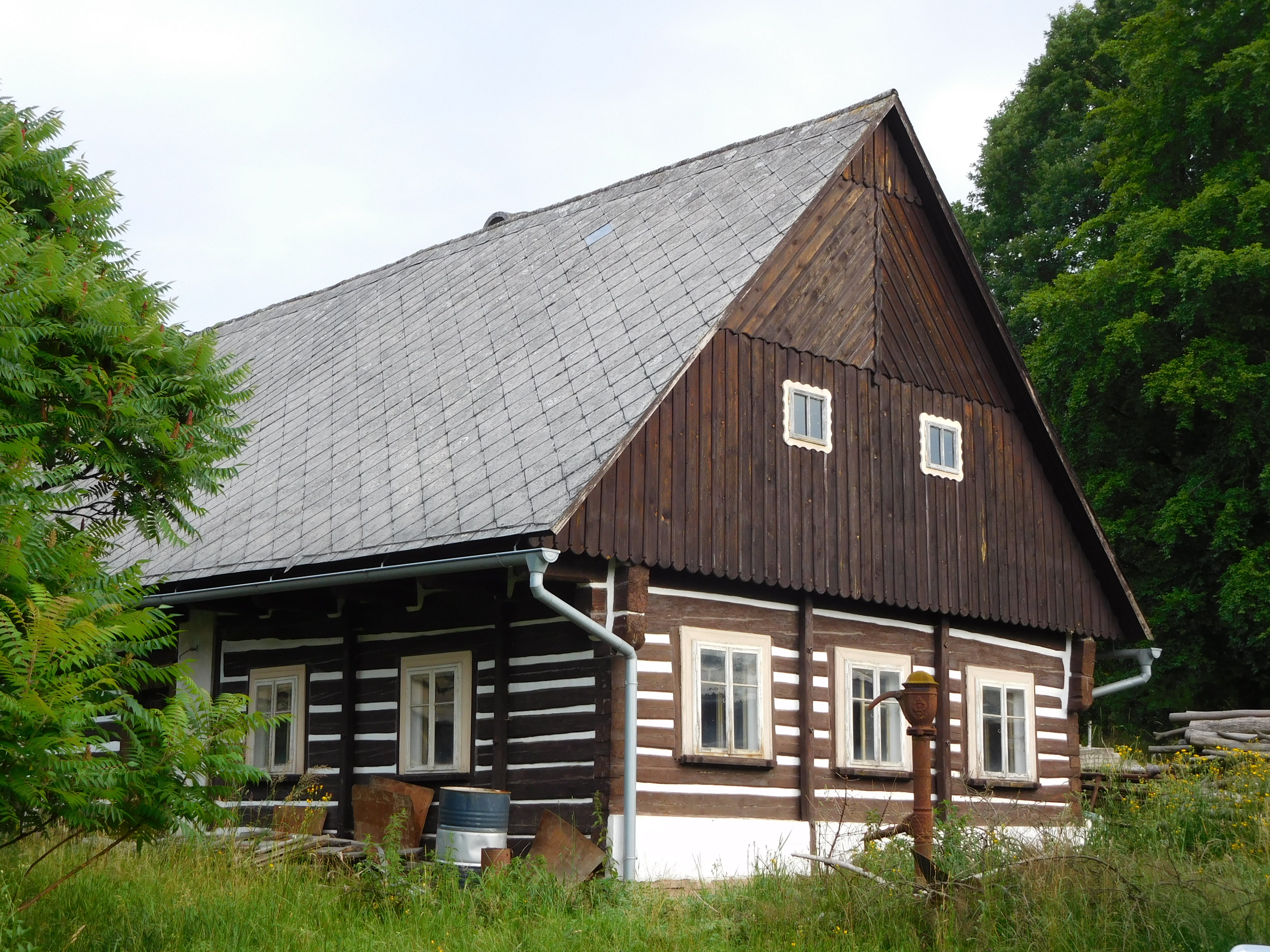
- A log house protected as a cultural monument

- Location in the Czech Republic
- Coordinates: 50°28′23″N 15°40′52″E
- Country: Czech Republic
- Region: Hradec Králové
- District: Trutnov
- First mentioned: 1358

Area
  - Total: 14.10 km^{2} (5.44 sq mi)
- Elevation: 453 m (1,486 ft)

Population (2026-01-01)
  - Total: 456
  - Density: 32.3/km^{2} (83.8/sq mi)
- Time zone: UTC+1 (CET)
  - Summer (DST): UTC+2 (CEST)
- Postal code: 544 74
- Website: www.hornibrusnice.cz

Horní Brusnice (German: Ober Prausnitz) is a municipality and village in Trutnov District in the Hradec Králové Region of the Czech Republic. It has about 500 inhabitants.

== Demographics ==
Historical population
Year	Pop.	±%
1869	1,591	—
1880	1,597	+0.4%
1890	1,518	−4.9%
1900	1,408	−7.2%
1910	1,310	−7.0%
1921	1,255	−4.2%
1930	1,225	−2.4%
1950	777	−36.6%
1961	738	−5.0%
1970	662	−10.3%
1980	556	−16.0%
1991	492	−11.5%
2001	466	−5.3%
2011	425	−8.8%
2021	428	+0.7%
Source: Censuses

== Sights ==
The main landmark of Horní Brusnice is the Church of Saint Nicholas. It was built in the Neoclassical style in 1842–1846.
