= Písek (Hradec Králové District) =

- Municipality
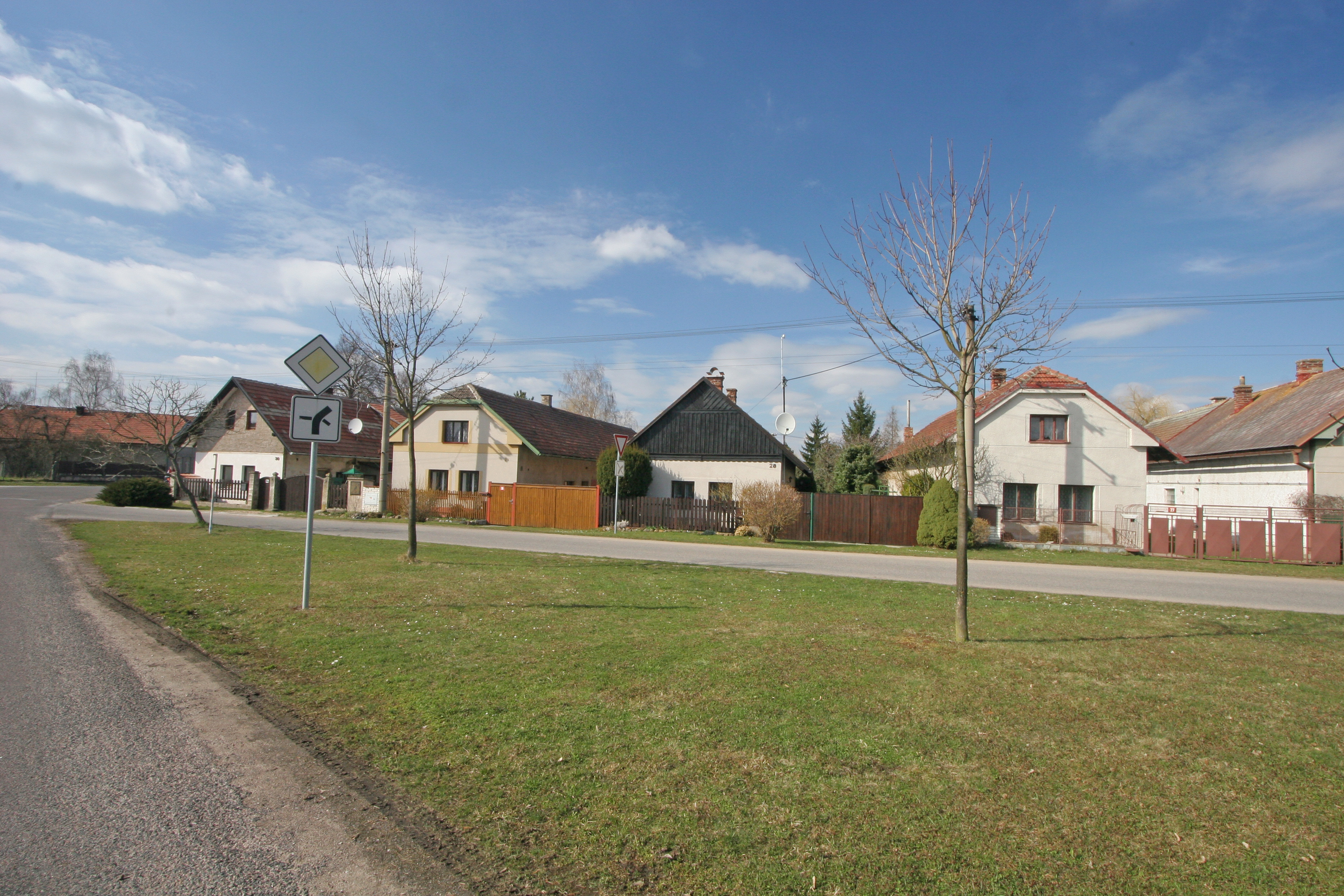
- Centre of Písek

- Coat of arms

- Location in the Czech Republic
- Coordinates: 50°9′20″N 15°30′6″E
- Country: Czech Republic
- Region: Hradec Králové
- District: Hradec Králové
- First mentioned: 1386

Area
  - Total: 4.35 km^{2} (1.68 sq mi)
- Elevation: 217 m (712 ft)

Population (2026-01-01)
  - Total: 310
  - Density: 71/km^{2} (180/sq mi)
- Time zone: UTC+1 (CET)
  - Summer (DST): UTC+2 (CEST)
- Postal code: 503 51
- Website: www.obec-pisek.cz

Písek is a municipality and village in Hradec Králové District in the Hradec Králové Region of the Czech Republic. It has about 300 inhabitants.

== Demographics ==
Historical population
Year	Pop.	±%
1869	385	—
1880	512	+33.0%
1890	498	−2.7%
1900	503	+1.0%
1910	495	−1.6%
1921	483	−2.4%
1930	427	−11.6%
1950	347	−18.7%
1961	361	+4.0%
1970	324	−10.2%
1980	307	−5.2%
1991	216	−29.6%
2001	187	−13.4%
2011	218	+16.6%
2021	261	+19.7%
Source: Censuses
