= Boharyně =

- Municipality
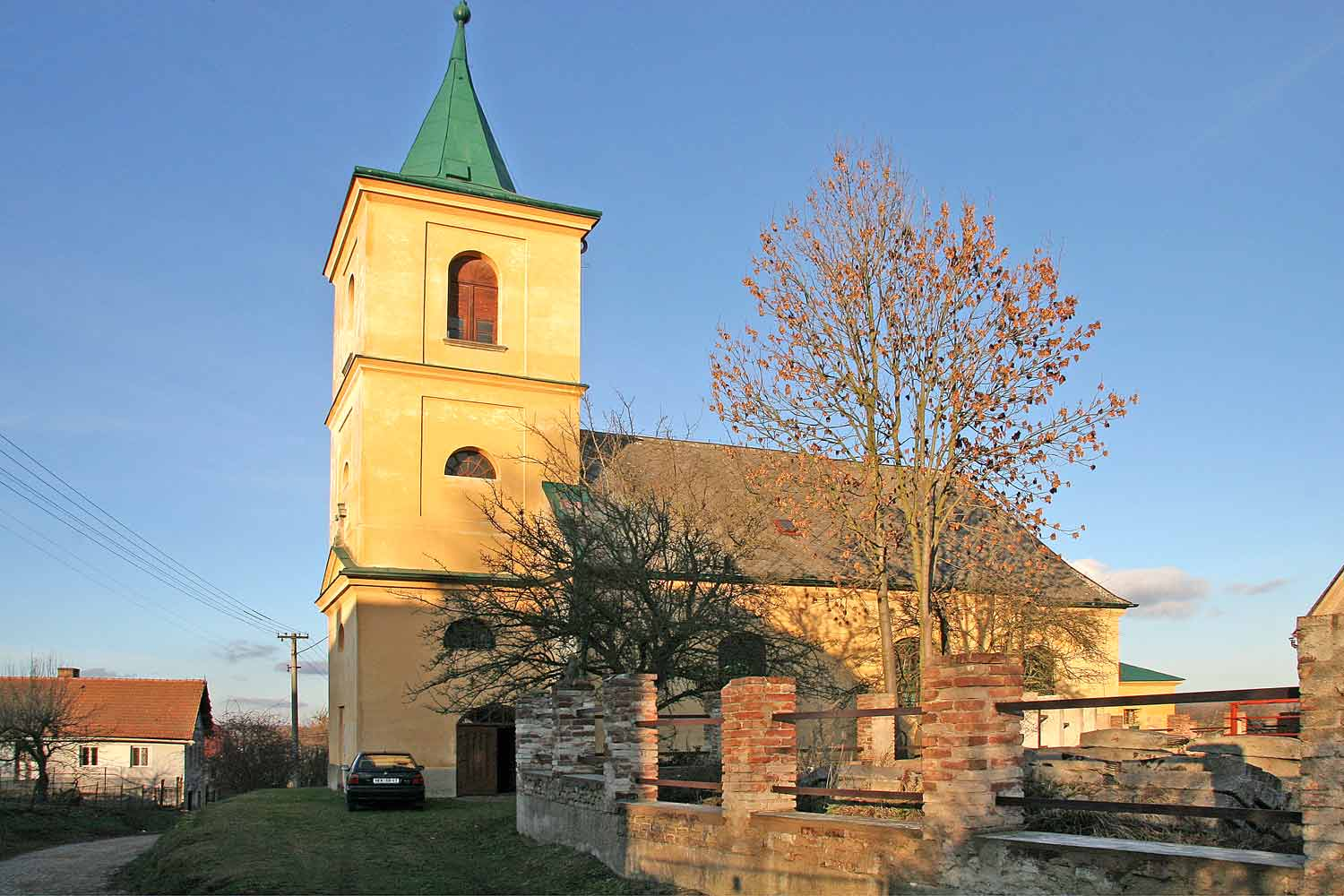
- Church of Saint Bartholomew

- Flag Coat of arms

- Location in the Czech Republic
- Coordinates: 50°12′14″N 15°37′51″E
- Country: Czech Republic
- Region: Hradec Králové
- District: Hradec Králové
- First mentioned: 1355

Area
  - Total: 11.64 km^{2} (4.49 sq mi)
- Elevation: 244 m (801 ft)

Population (2026-01-01)
  - Total: 595
  - Density: 51.1/km^{2} (132/sq mi)
- Time zone: UTC+1 (CET)
  - Summer (DST): UTC+2 (CEST)
- Postal code: 503 23
- Website: www.boharyne.cz

Boharyně is a municipality and village in Hradec Králové District in the Hradec Králové Region of the Czech Republic. It has about 600 inhabitants.

== Administrative division ==
Boharyně consists of five municipal parts (in brackets population according to the 2021 census):

- Boharyně (198)
- Budín (13)
- Homyle (218)
- Trnava (99)
- Zvíkov (56)

== Demographics ==
Historical population
Year	Pop.	±%
1869	1,097	—
1880	1,110	+1.2%
1890	1,124	+1.3%
1900	1,088	−3.2%
1910	986	−9.4%
1921	921	−6.6%
1930	859	−6.7%
1950	681	−20.7%
1961	649	−4.7%
1970	621	−4.3%
1980	589	−5.2%
1991	507	−13.9%
2001	523	+3.2%
2011	528	+1.0%
2021	584	+10.6%
Source: Censuses
