= Nové Město (Hradec Králové District) =

- Municipality
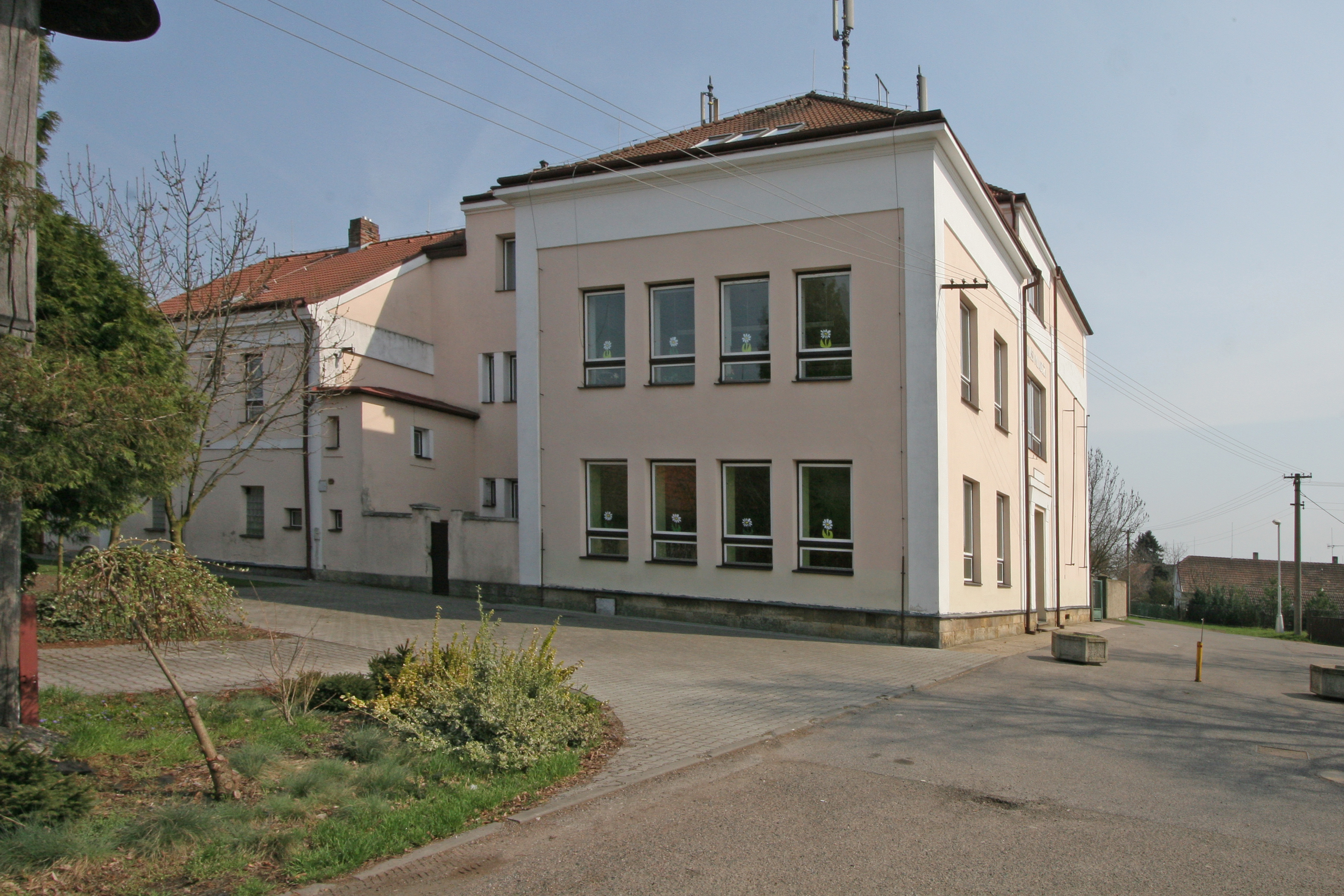
- Primary school

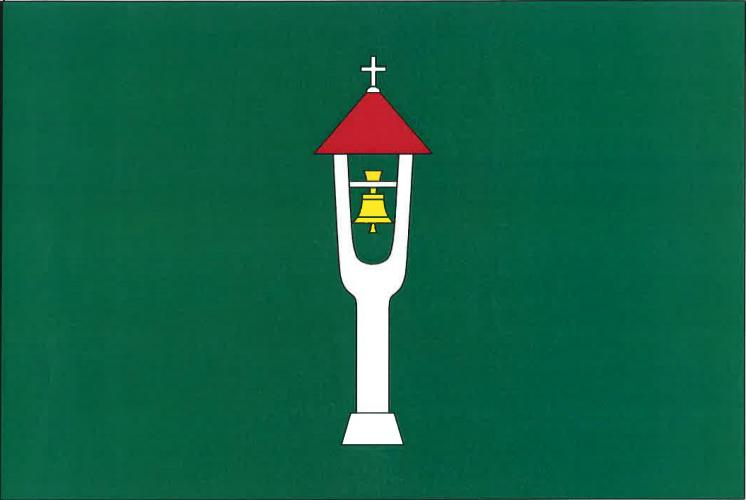
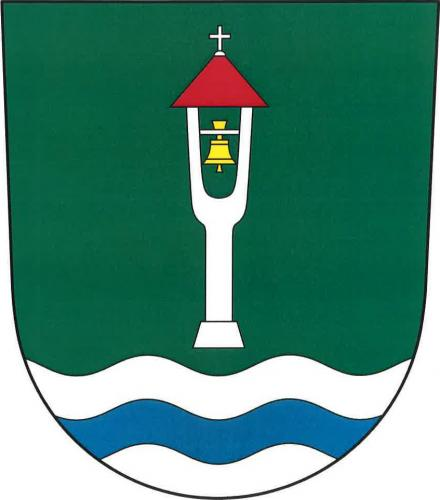
- Flag Coat of arms

- Location in the Czech Republic
- Coordinates: 50°8′52″N 15°29′43″E
- Country: Czech Republic
- Region: Hradec Králové
- District: Hradec Králové
- First mentioned: 1397

Area
  - Total: 7.94 km^{2} (3.07 sq mi)
- Elevation: 222 m (728 ft)

Population (2026-01-01)
  - Total: 411
  - Density: 51.8/km^{2} (134/sq mi)
- Time zone: UTC+1 (CET)
  - Summer (DST): UTC+2 (CEST)
- Postal code: 503 51
- Website: www.obecnovemesto.cz

Nové Město (German: Neustadtl) is a municipality and village in Hradec Králové District in the Hradec Králové Region of the Czech Republic. It has about 400 inhabitants.

== Demographics ==
Historical population
Year	Pop.	±%
1869	362	—
1880	446	+23.2%
1890	448	+0.4%
1900	399	−10.9%
1910	442	+10.8%
1921	475	+7.5%
1930	458	−3.6%
1950	377	−17.7%
1961	417	+10.6%
1970	406	−2.6%
1980	388	−4.4%
1991	385	−0.8%
2001	397	+3.1%
2011	432	+8.8%
2021	390	−9.7%
Source: Censuses
