= Kosičky =

- Municipality
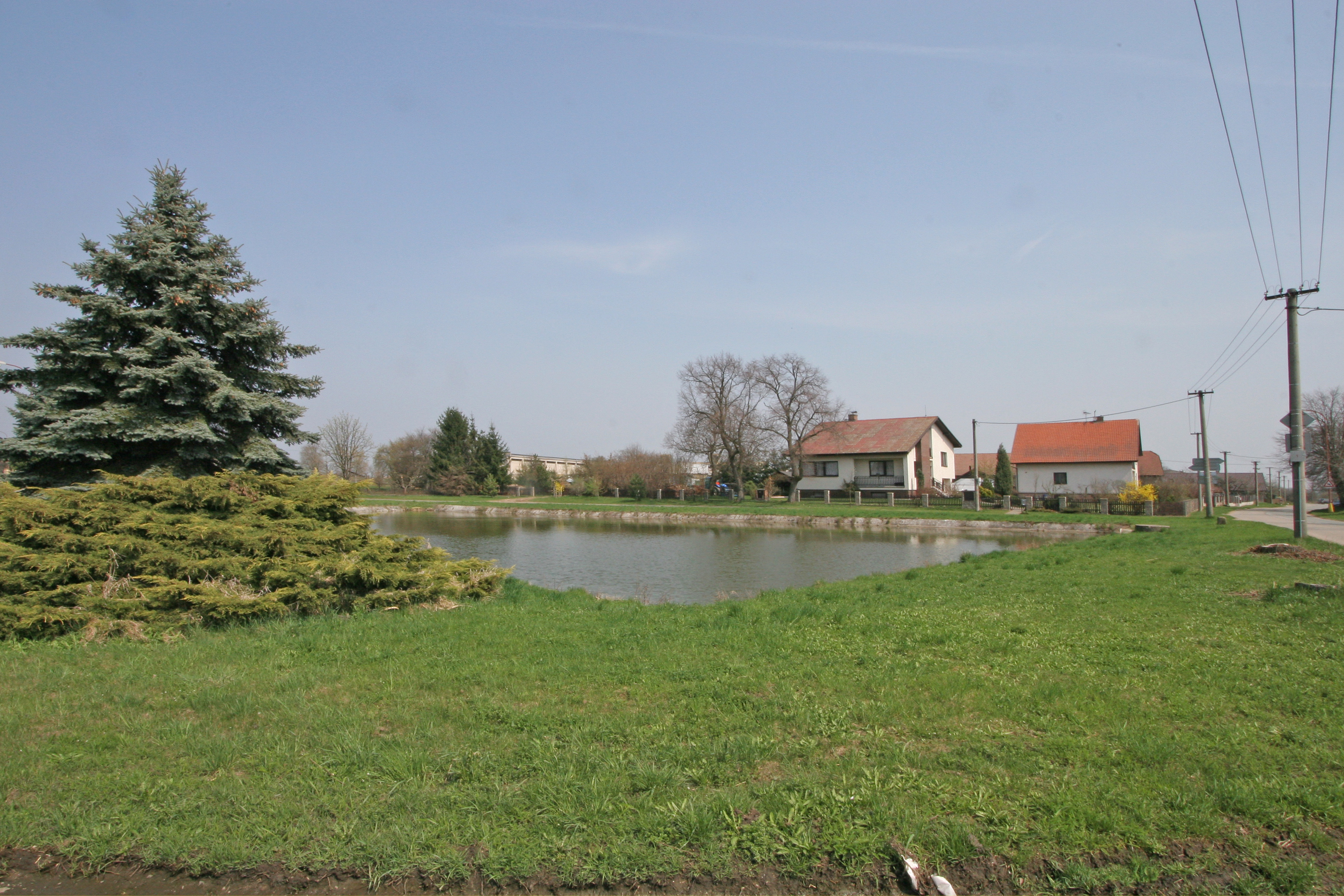
- Pond in the centre of Kosičky

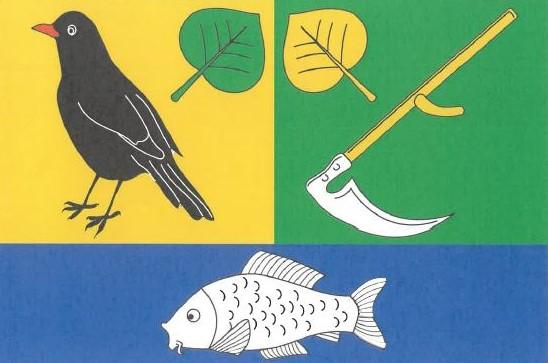
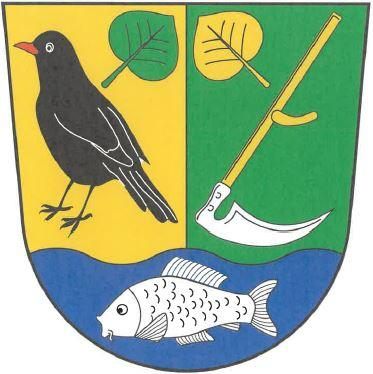
- Flag Coat of arms

- Location in the Czech Republic
- Coordinates: 50°10′43″N 15°33′21″E
- Country: Czech Republic
- Region: Hradec Králové
- District: Hradec Králové
- First mentioned: 1369

Area
  - Total: 7.84 km^{2} (3.03 sq mi)
- Elevation: 224 m (735 ft)

Population (2026-01-01)
  - Total: 337
  - Density: 43.0/km^{2} (111/sq mi)
- Time zone: UTC+1 (CET)
  - Summer (DST): UTC+2 (CEST)
- Postal code: 503 65
- Website: www.kosicky.cz

Kosičky is a municipality and village in Hradec Králové District in the Hradec Králové Region of the Czech Republic. It has about 300 inhabitants.

== Demographics ==
Historical population
Year	Pop.	±%
1869	446	—
1880	569	+27.6%
1890	553	−2.8%
1900	528	−4.5%
1910	538	+1.9%
1921	530	−1.5%
1930	510	−3.8%
1950	406	−20.4%
1961	391	−3.7%
1970	357	−8.7%
1980	334	−6.4%
1991	360	+7.8%
2001	380	+5.6%
2011	332	−12.6%
2021	334	+0.6%
Source: Censuses
