= Puchlovice =

- Municipality
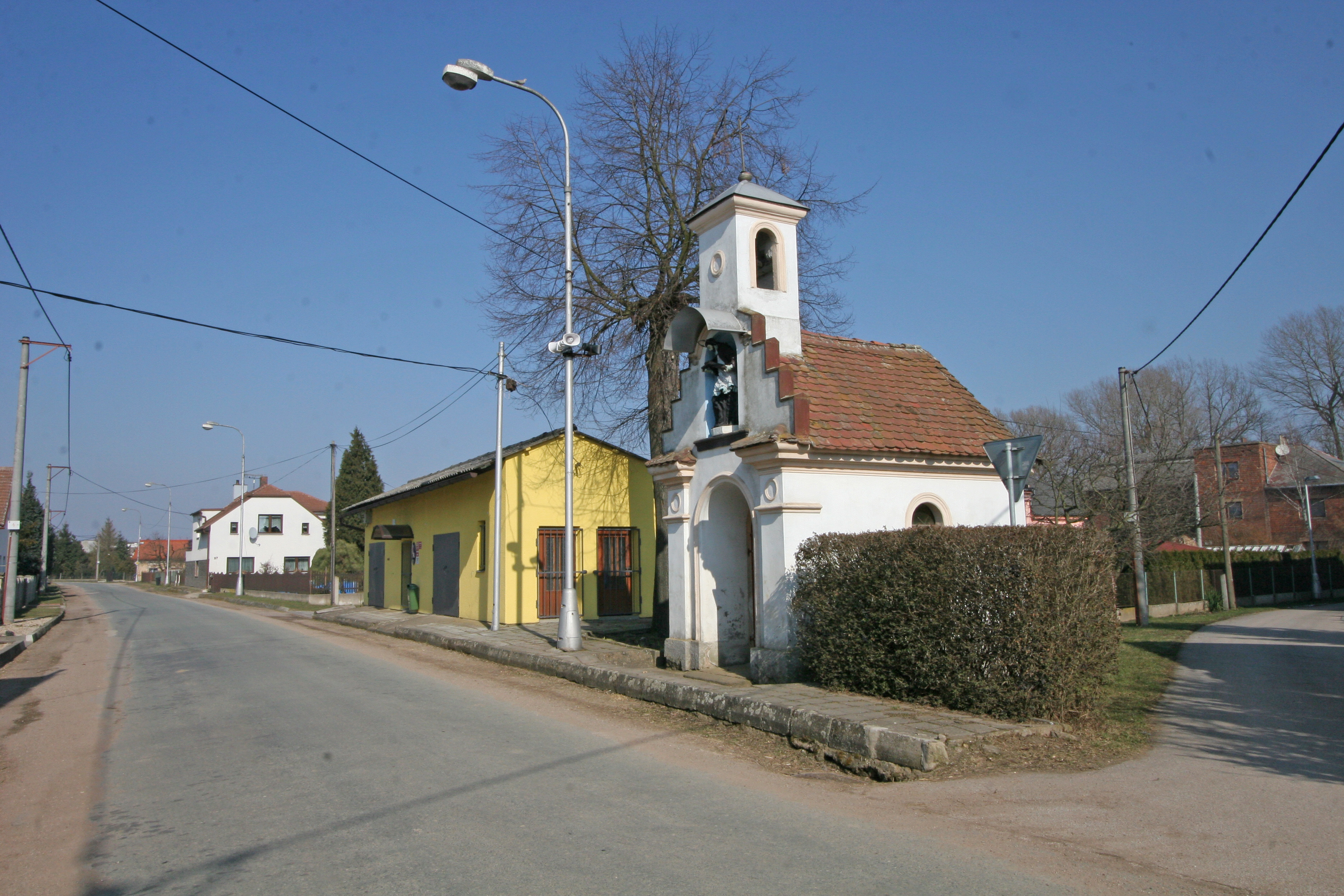
- Chapel

- Flag Coat of arms

- Location in the Czech Republic
- Coordinates: 50°11′9″N 15°37′35″E
- Country: Czech Republic
- Region: Hradec Králové
- District: Hradec Králové
- First mentioned: 1547

Area
  - Total: 2.52 km^{2} (0.97 sq mi)
- Elevation: 232 m (761 ft)

Population (2026-01-01)
  - Total: 119
  - Density: 47.2/km^{2} (122/sq mi)
- Time zone: UTC+1 (CET)
  - Summer (DST): UTC+2 (CEST)
- Postal code: 503 15
- Website: www.puchlovice.cz

Puchlovice is a municipality and village in Hradec Králové District in the Hradec Králové Region of the Czech Republic. It has about 100 inhabitants.

== Demographics ==
Historical population
Year	Pop.	±%
1869	313	—
1880	295	−5.8%
1890	283	−4.1%
1900	241	−14.8%
1910	270	+12.0%
1921	252	−6.7%
1930	244	−3.2%
1950	188	−23.0%
1961	192	+2.1%
1970	172	−10.4%
1980	156	−9.3%
1991	124	−20.5%
2001	130	+4.8%
2011	134	+3.1%
2021	110	−17.9%
Source: Censuses
