= Kunčice (Hradec Králové District) =

- Municipality
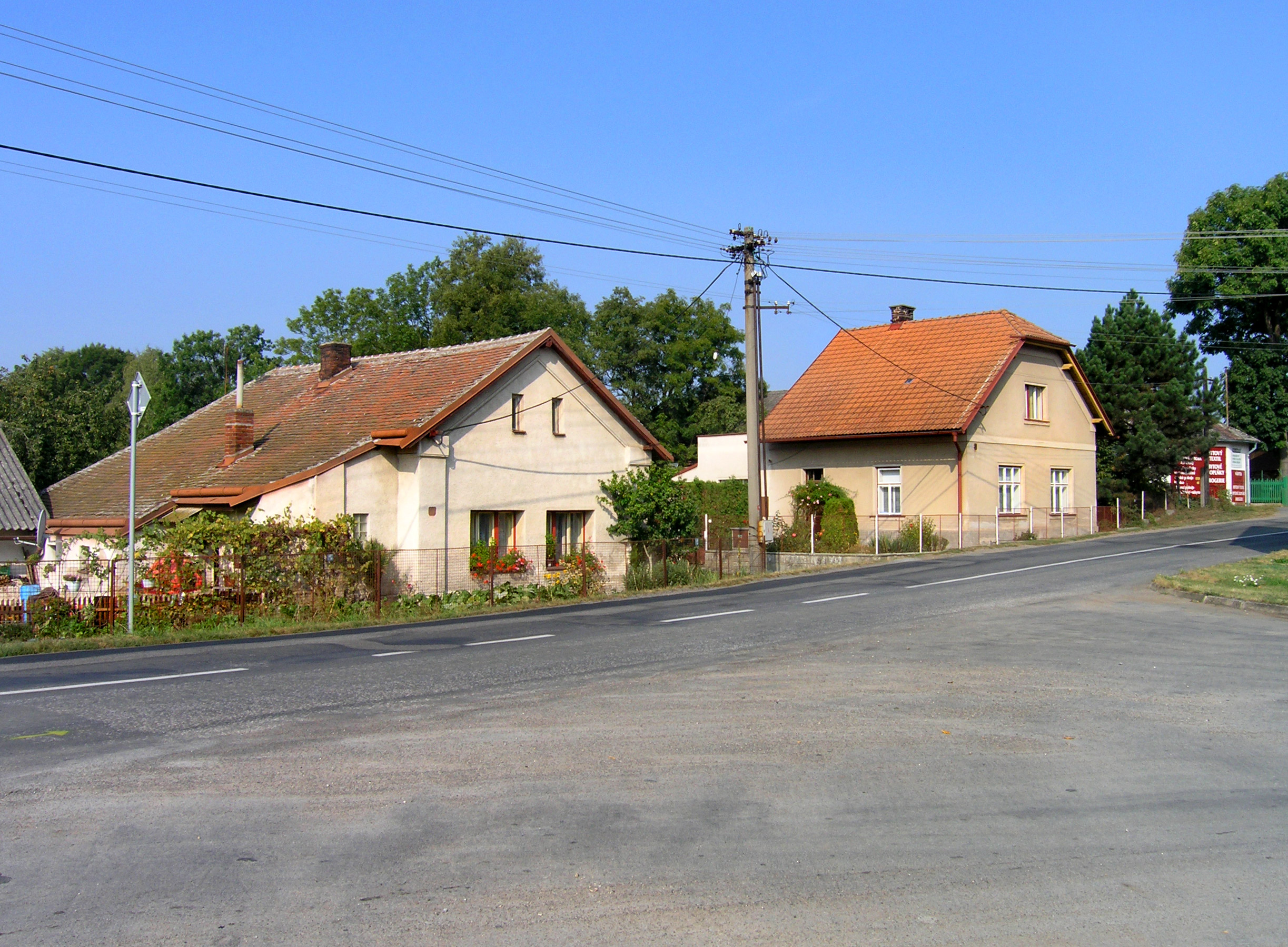
- Houses in the centre of Kunčice

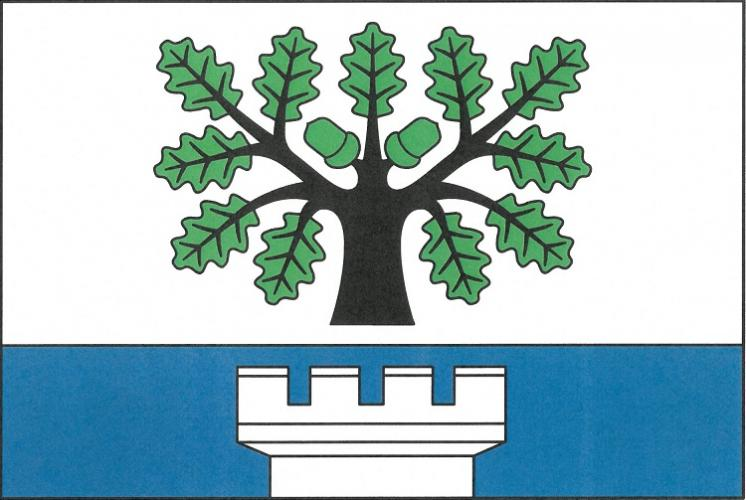
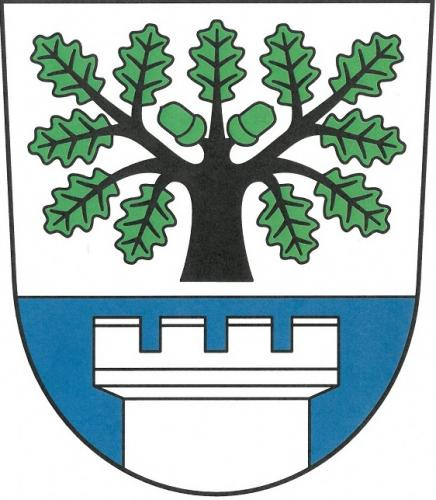
- Flag Coat of arms

- Location in the Czech Republic
- Coordinates: 50°13′3″N 15°38′10″E
- Country: Czech Republic
- Region: Hradec Králové
- District: Hradec Králové
- First mentioned: 1382

Area
  - Total: 5.92 km^{2} (2.29 sq mi)
- Elevation: 262 m (860 ft)

Population (2026-01-01)
  - Total: 387
  - Density: 65.4/km^{2} (169/sq mi)
- Time zone: UTC+1 (CET)
  - Summer (DST): UTC+2 (CEST)
- Postal code: 503 15
- Website: www.kuncice.info

Kunčice is a municipality and village in Hradec Králové District in the Hradec Králové Region of the Czech Republic. It has about 400 inhabitants.

== Demographics ==
Historical population
| Year | Pop. | ±% |
|---|---|---|
| 1869 | 387 | — |
| 1880 | 500 | +29.2% |
| 1890 | 488 | −2.4% |
| 1900 | 542 | +11.1% |
| 1910 | 488 | −10.0% |
| 1921 | 487 | −0.2% |
| 1930 | 395 | −18.9% |
| 1950 | 337 | −14.7% |
| 1961 | 373 | +10.7% |
| 1970 | 317 | −15.0% |
| 1980 | 287 | −9.5% |
| 1991 | 258 | −10.1% |
| 2001 | 267 | +3.5% |
| 2011 | 309 | +15.7% |
| 2021 | 377 | +22.0% |
Source: Censuses
