= Sadová =

- Municipality
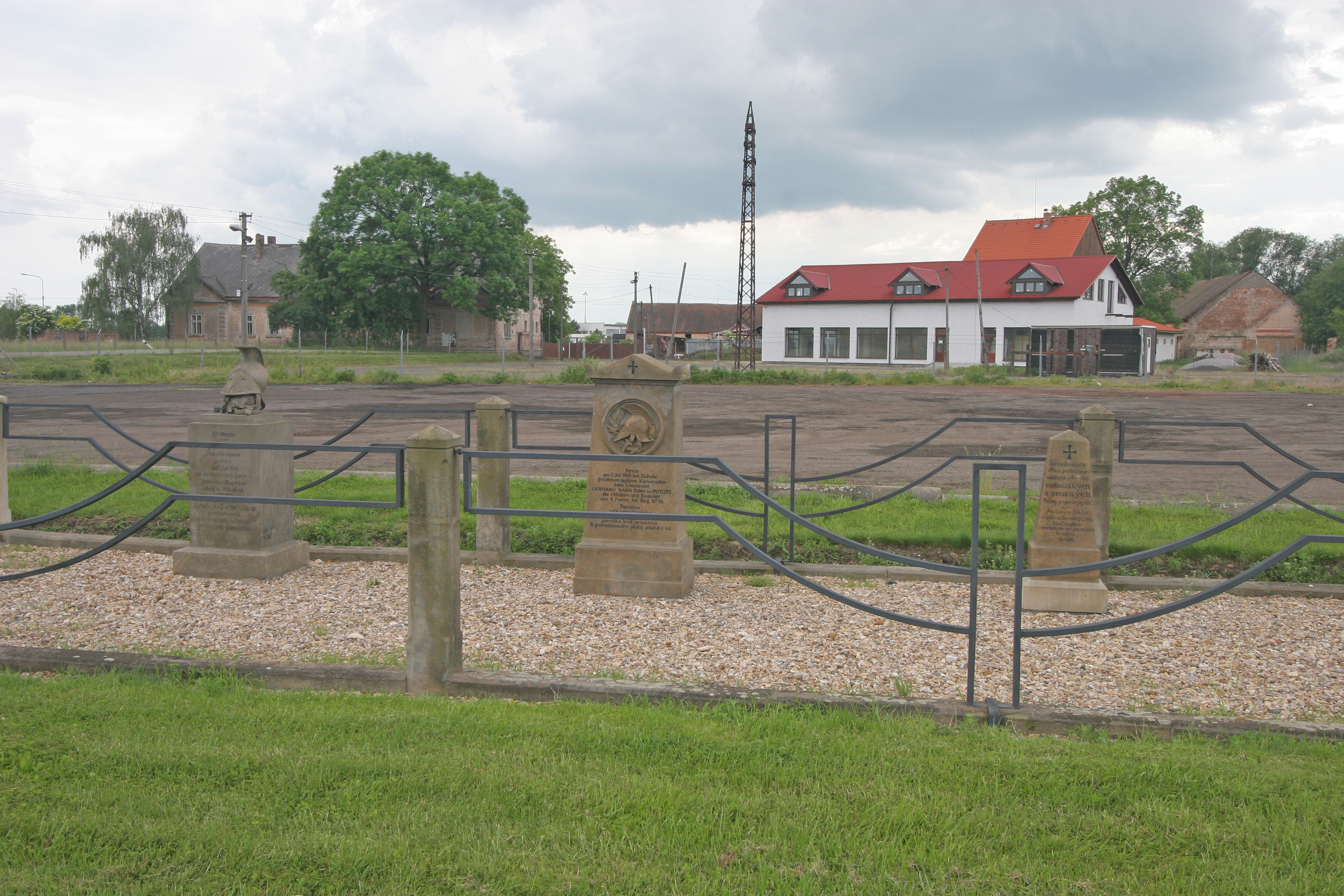
- Tombstones from the Battle of Königgrätz

- Flag Coat of arms

- Location in the Czech Republic
- Coordinates: 50°17′51″N 15°42′0″E
- Country: Czech Republic
- Region: Hradec Králové
- District: Hradec Králové
- First mentioned: 1086

Area
  - Total: 2.06 km^{2} (0.80 sq mi)
- Elevation: 259 m (850 ft)

Population (2026-01-01)
  - Total: 320
  - Density: 160/km^{2} (400/sq mi)
- Time zone: UTC+1 (CET)
  - Summer (DST): UTC+2 (CEST)
- Postal code: 503 15
- Website: www.obec-sadova.cz

Sadová (German: Sadowa) is a municipality and village in Hradec Králové District in the Hradec Králové Region of the Czech Republic. It has about 300 inhabitants.

== Etymology ==
The name is derived from the Czech word sad, meaning 'orchard'.

== Geography ==
Sadová is located about 12 kilometres (7 mi) northwest of Hradec Králové. It lies in a flat agricultural landscape in the East Elbe Table. The municipality is situated on the right bank of the Bystřice River.

== History ==
The first written mention of Sadová is from 1086, when it was owned by the St. George's Convent in Prague. Between 1228 and 1400, the village was owned by various lesser nobles and by the Teutonic Order in Hradec Králové. Until 1420, it was again property of the St. George's Convent. In 1448, Sadová was acquired by the Knights of Sloupno, and they became known as the Knights of Sadovský of Sloupno. After the Battle of White Mountain in 1620, their properties were confiscated and Sadová was bought by Albrecht von Wallenstein.

Albrecht von Wallenstein owned Sadová only one year, then he exchanged the village with Maria Magdalena Trčková for other properties. She bequeathed the village to Adam Erdmann Trčka of Lípa, but he was murdered in 1636, and Sadová was gifted to General Lieutenant Matthias Gallas. In the late 1640s, Sadová was acquired by marriage by the Schaffgotsch family. They ruled the village until 1788, when they had to sell it due to debts. From 1788 to 1829 it was owned by Lords of Gränzenstein, and from 1829 by the Harrach family.

On 3 July 1866, the area around Sadová became the scene of the sanguinary Battle of Königgrätz, also known as the Battle of Sadowa, the decisive combat of the Austro-Prussian War.

Despite France being neutral in that war, the French public resented the Prussian victory and demanded "Revanche pour Sadova" (Revenge for Sadowa), which was one factor leading to the Franco-Prussian War of 1870.

== Demographics ==
Historical population

Year	Pop.	±%
1869	105	—
1880	114	+8.6%
1890	205	+79.8%
1900	183	−10.7%
1910	174	−4.9%

Year	Pop.	±%
1921	181	+4.0%
1930	315	+74.0%
1950	225	−28.6%
1961	303	+34.7%
1970	328	+8.3%

Year	Pop.	±%
1980	369	+12.5%
1991	359	−2.7%
2001	326	−9.2%
2011	326	+0.0%
2021	319	−2.1%

Source: Censuses

== Transport ==
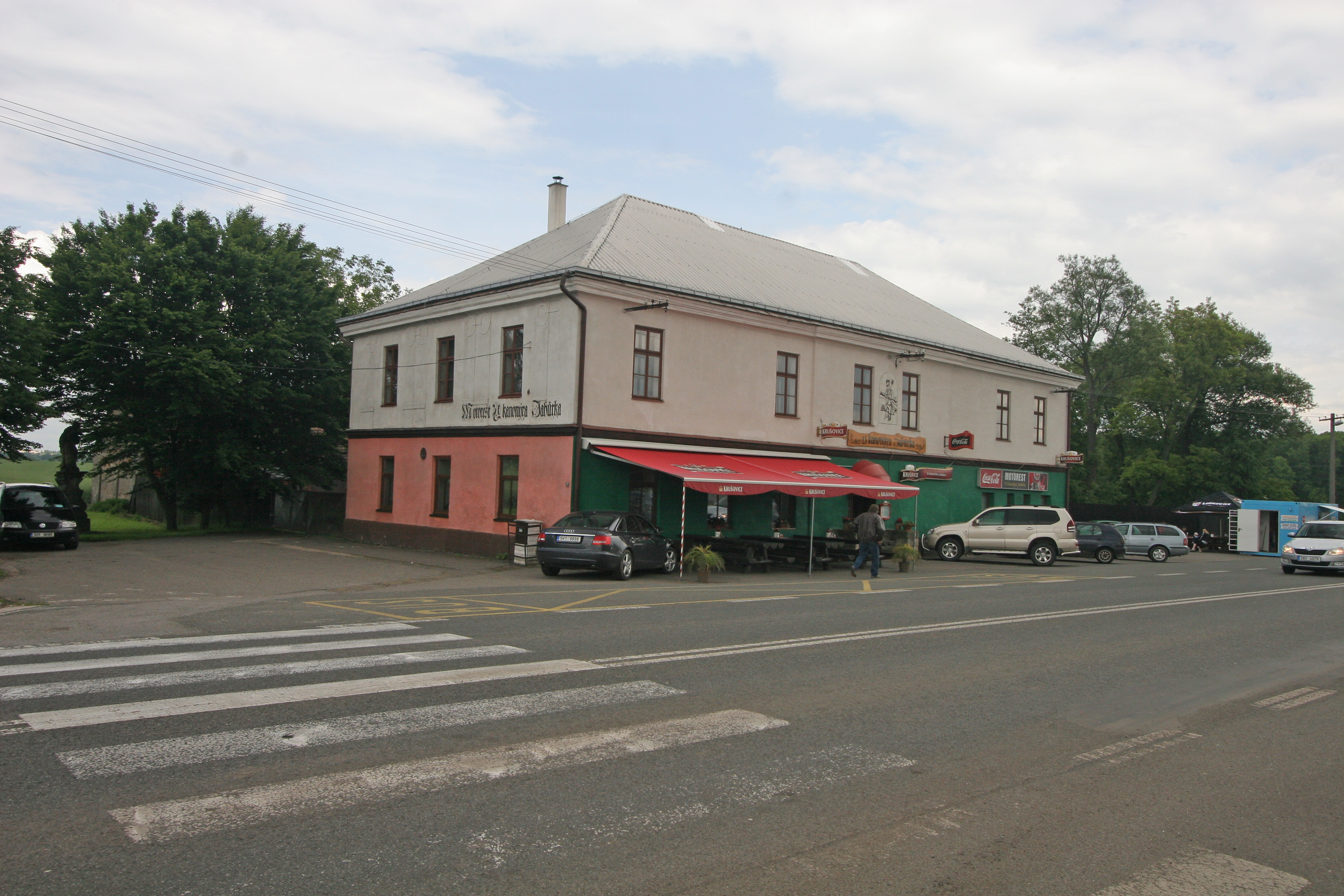
Tavern U Kanonýra Jabůrka

The I/35 road (part of the European route E442) runs through the municipality.

Sadová is located on the railway line from Hradec Králové to Turnov.

== Sights ==
There are no protected cultural monuments in the municipality. The Battle of Königgrätz is commemorated by a military cemetery from 1866 with several monuments.
