= Kosice (Hradec Králové District) =

- Municipality
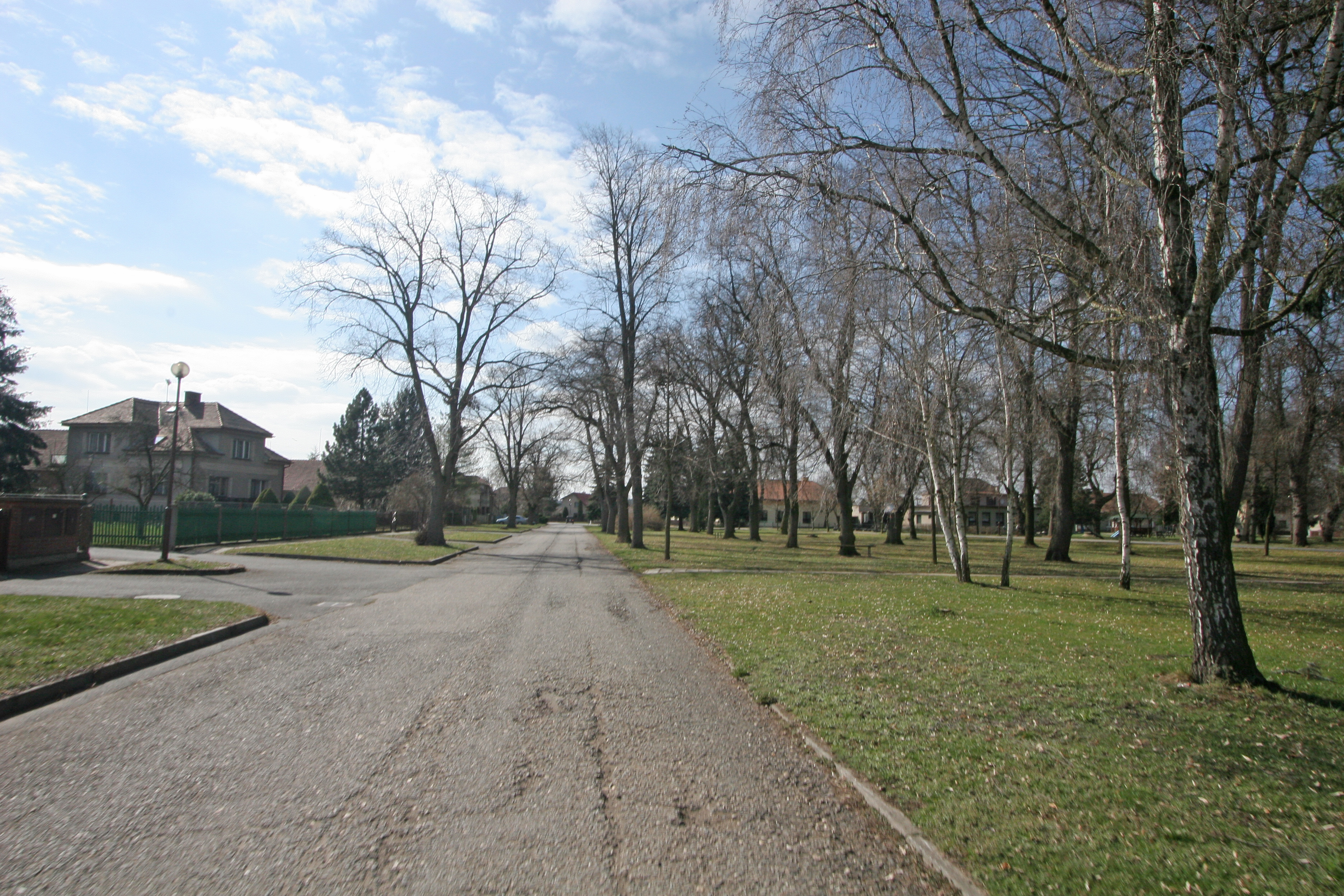
- Park in the centre of Kosice

- Flag Coat of arms

- Location in the Czech Republic
- Coordinates: 50°10′47″N 15°32′6″E
- Country: Czech Republic
- Region: Hradec Králové
- District: Hradec Králové
- First mentioned: 1315

Area
  - Total: 7.83 km^{2} (3.02 sq mi)
- Elevation: 225 m (738 ft)

Population (2026-01-01)
  - Total: 348
  - Density: 44.4/km^{2} (115/sq mi)
- Time zone: UTC+1 (CET)
  - Summer (DST): UTC+2 (CEST)
- Postal code: 503 51
- Website: www.kosice.cz

Kosice (Czech pronunciation: [ˈkosɪtsɛ]) is a municipality and village in Hradec Králové District in the Hradec Králové Region of the Czech Republic. It has about 300 inhabitants.

== Demographics ==
Historical population
| Year | Pop. | ±% |
|---|---|---|
| 1869 | 486 | — |
| 1880 | 562 | +15.6% |
| 1890 | 574 | +2.1% |
| 1900 | 538 | −6.3% |
| 1910 | 553 | +2.8% |
| 1921 | 502 | −9.2% |
| 1930 | 501 | −0.2% |
| 1950 | 390 | −22.2% |
| 1961 | 387 | −0.8% |
| 1970 | 350 | −9.6% |
| 1980 | 328 | −6.3% |
| 1991 | 306 | −6.7% |
| 2001 | 310 | +1.3% |
| 2011 | 340 | +9.7% |
| 2021 | 353 | +3.8% |
Source: Censuses
