= Sovětice =

- Municipality
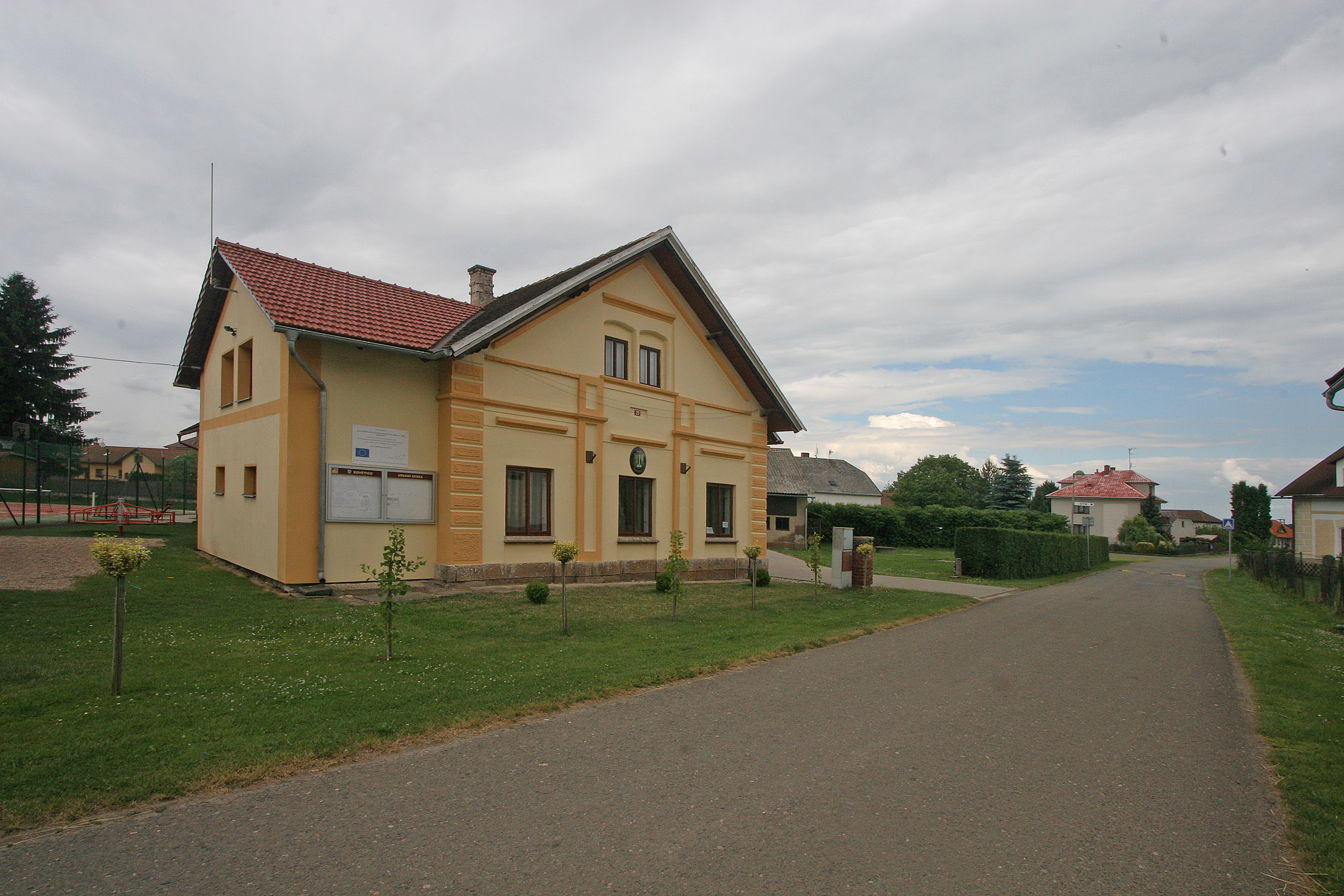
- Municipal office

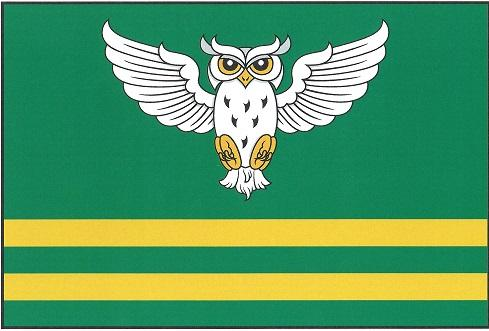
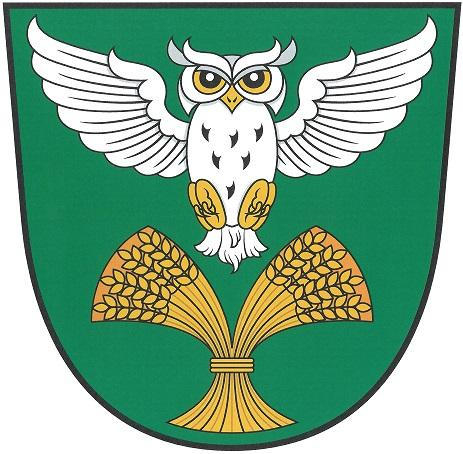
- Flag Coat of arms

- Location in the Czech Republic
- Coordinates: 50°18′27″N 15°42′21″E
- Country: Czech Republic
- Region: Hradec Králové
- District: Hradec Králové
- First mentioned: 1369

Area
  - Total: 4.81 km^{2} (1.86 sq mi)
- Elevation: 263 m (863 ft)

Population (2026-01-01)
  - Total: 236
  - Density: 49.1/km^{2} (127/sq mi)
- Time zone: UTC+1 (CET)
  - Summer (DST): UTC+2 (CEST)
- Postal code: 503 15
- Website: www.sovetice.cz

Sovětice is a municipality and village in Hradec Králové District in the Hradec Králové Region of the Czech Republic. It has about 200 inhabitants.

== Administrative division ==
Sovětice consists of two municipal parts (in brackets population according to the 2021 census):

- Sovětice (150)
- Horní Černůtky (74)

== Demographics ==
Historical population
| Year | Pop. | ±% |
|---|---|---|
| 1869 | 492 | — |
| 1880 | 455 | −7.5% |
| 1890 | 445 | −2.2% |
| 1900 | 446 | +0.2% |
| 1910 | 429 | −3.8% |
| 1921 | 423 | −1.4% |
| 1930 | 384 | −9.2% |
| 1950 | 284 | −26.0% |
| 1961 | 262 | −7.7% |
| 1970 | 207 | −21.0% |
| 1980 | 218 | +5.3% |
| 1991 | 190 | −12.8% |
| 2001 | 192 | +1.1% |
| 2011 | 224 | +16.7% |
| 2021 | 224 | +0.0% |
Source: Censuses
