= Mokrovousy =

- Municipality
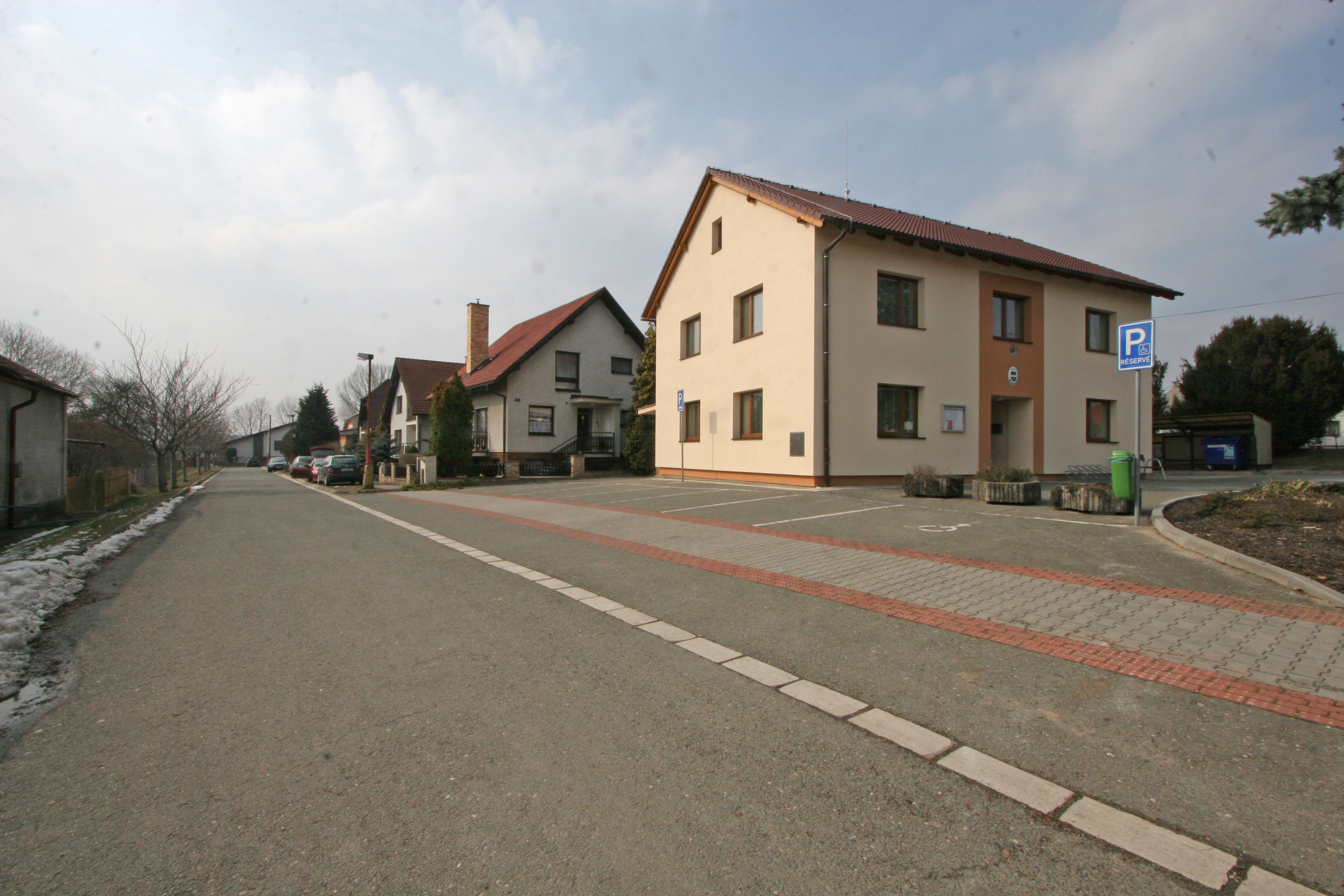
- Municipal office

- Flag Coat of arms

- Location in the Czech Republic
- Coordinates: 50°16′30″N 15°41′9″E
- Country: Czech Republic
- Region: Hradec Králové
- District: Hradec Králové
- First mentioned: 1366

Area
  - Total: 4.87 km^{2} (1.88 sq mi)
- Elevation: 252 m (827 ft)

Population (2026-01-01)
  - Total: 352
  - Density: 72.3/km^{2} (187/sq mi)
- Time zone: UTC+1 (CET)
  - Summer (DST): UTC+2 (CEST)
- Postal code: 503 15
- Website: www.mokrovousy.cz

Mokrovousy (Czech pronunciation: [ˈmokrovousɪ]; German: Nassenbart) is a municipality and village in Hradec Králové District in the Hradec Králové Region of the Czech Republic. It has about 400 inhabitants.

== Demographics ==
Historical population
| Year | Pop. | ±% |
|---|---|---|
| 1869 | 342 | — |
| 1880 | 353 | +3.2% |
| 1890 | 403 | +14.2% |
| 1900 | 404 | +0.2% |
| 1910 | 326 | −19.3% |
| 1921 | 341 | +4.6% |
| 1930 | 409 | +19.9% |
| 1950 | 355 | −13.2% |
| 1961 | 369 | +3.9% |
| 1970 | 336 | −8.9% |
| 1980 | 305 | −9.2% |
| 1991 | 265 | −13.1% |
| 2001 | 277 | +4.5% |
| 2011 | 331 | +19.5% |
| 2021 | 356 | +7.6% |
Source: Censuses
