= Rohoznice (Pardubice District) =

- Municipality
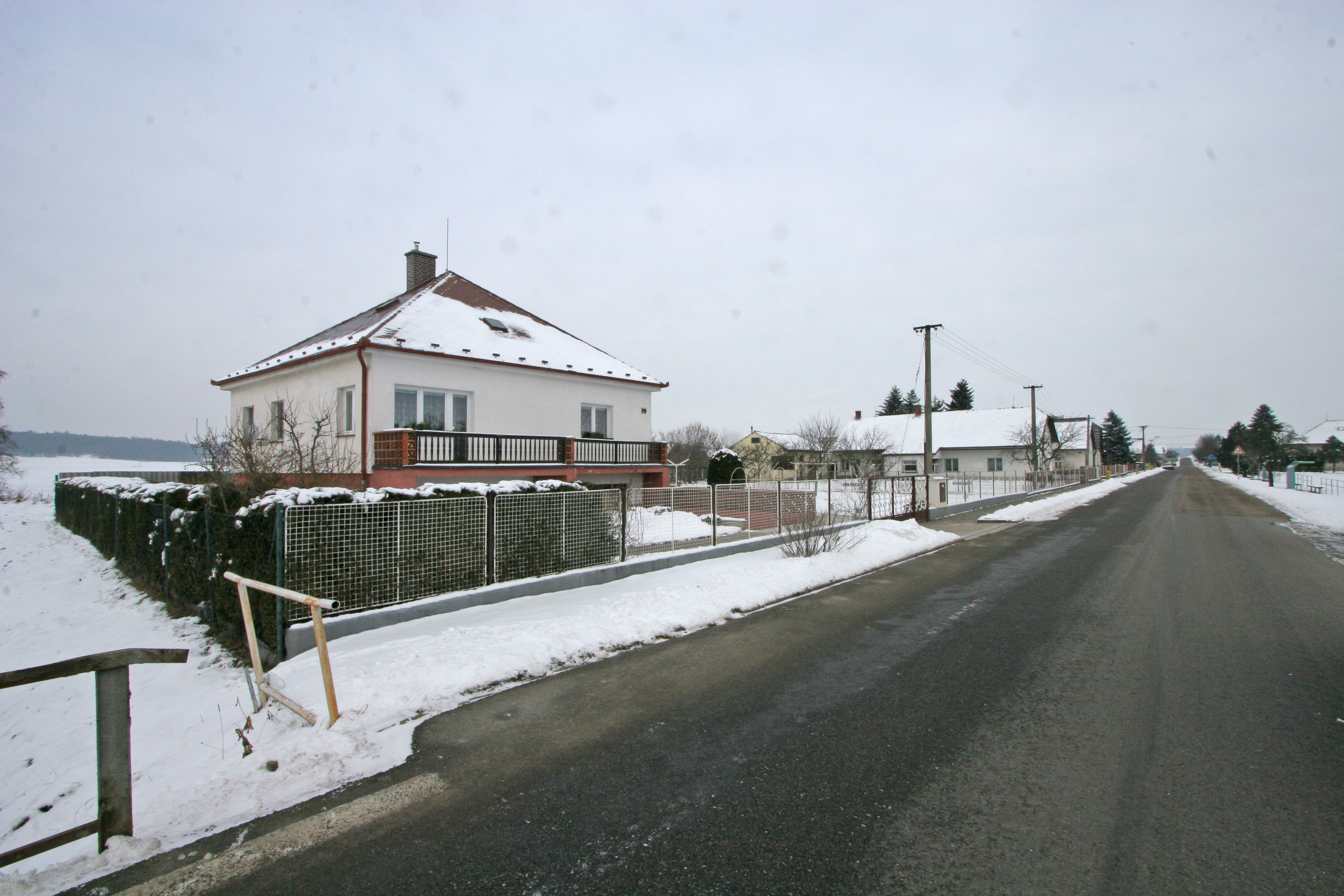
- Main road

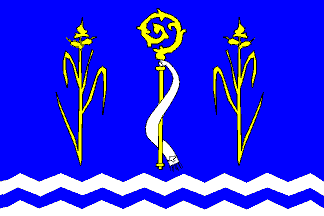
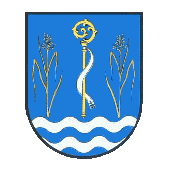
- Flag Coat of arms

- Location in the Czech Republic
- Coordinates: 50°7′38″N 15°39′52″E
- Country: Czech Republic
- Region: Pardubice
- District: Pardubice
- First mentioned: 1372

Area
  - Total: 3.48 km^{2} (1.34 sq mi)
- Elevation: 234 m (768 ft)

Population (2026-01-01)
  - Total: 254
  - Density: 73.0/km^{2} (189/sq mi)
- Time zone: UTC+1 (CET)
  - Summer (DST): UTC+2 (CEST)
- Postal code: 533 41
- Website: www.rohoznice.cz

Rohoznice is a municipality and village in Pardubice District in the Pardubice Region of the Czech Republic. It has about 300 inhabitants.

== Demographics ==
Historical population
Year	Pop.	±%
1869	317	—
1880	331	+4.4%
1890	317	−4.2%
1900	311	−1.9%
1910	336	+8.0%
1921	326	−3.0%
1930	342	+4.9%
1950	284	−17.0%
1961	300	+5.6%
1970	276	−8.0%
1980	265	−4.0%
1991	250	−5.7%
2001	244	−2.4%
2011	234	−4.1%
2021	259	+10.7%
Source: Censuses
