= Hněvčeves =

- Municipality
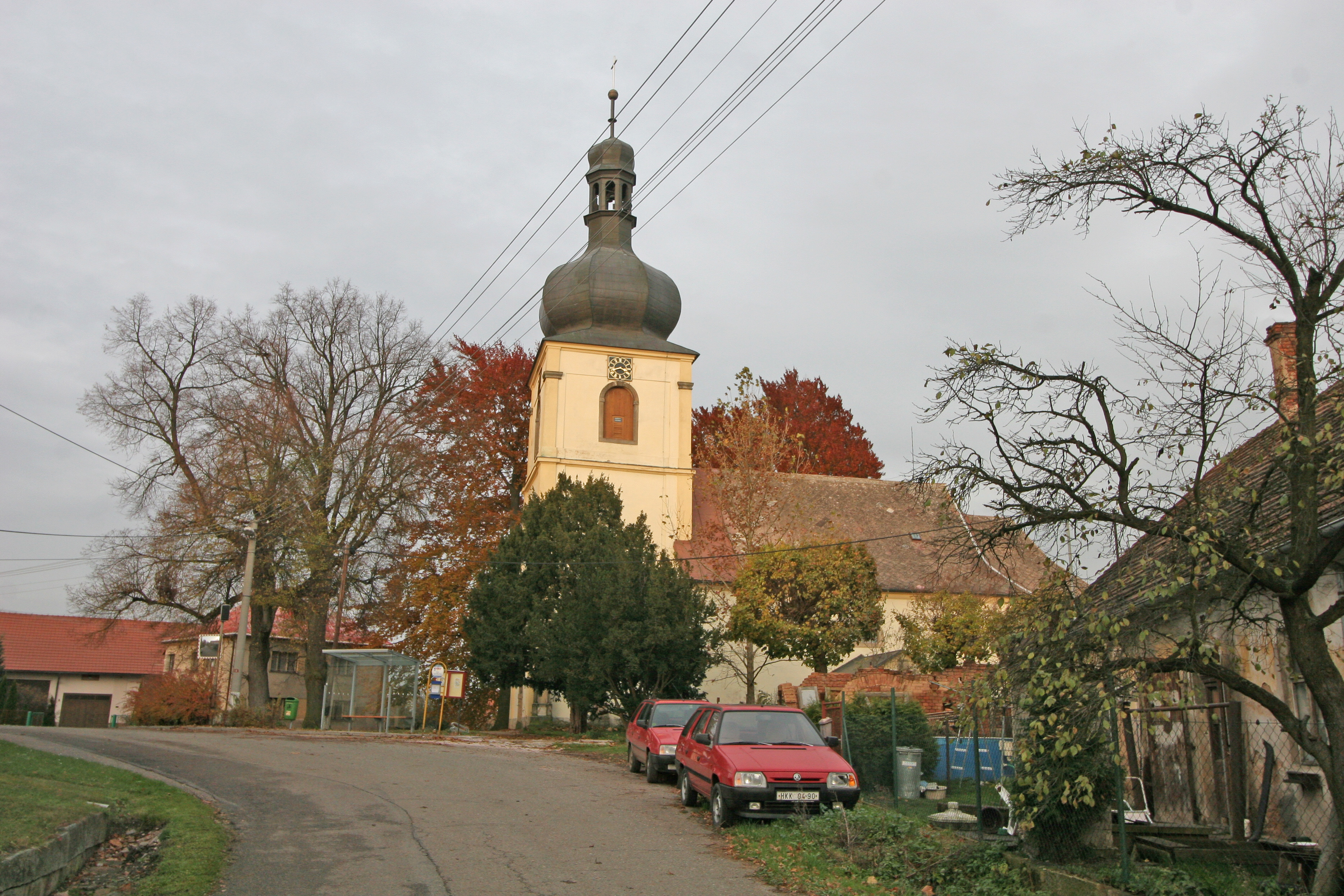
- Church of Saint George

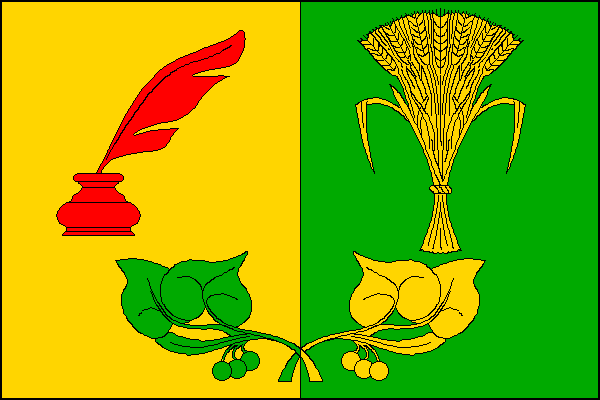
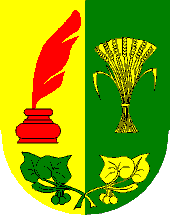
- Flag Coat of arms

- Location in the Czech Republic
- Coordinates: 50°18′54″N 15°42′58″E
- Country: Czech Republic
- Region: Hradec Králové
- District: Hradec Králové
- First mentioned: 1369

Area
  - Total: 2.68 km^{2} (1.03 sq mi)
- Elevation: 277 m (909 ft)

Population (2026-01-01)
  - Total: 177
  - Density: 66.0/km^{2} (171/sq mi)
- Time zone: UTC+1 (CET)
  - Summer (DST): UTC+2 (CEST)
- Postal code: 503 15
- Website: www.hnevceves.cz

Hněvčeves is a municipality and village in Hradec Králové District in the Hradec Králové Region of the Czech Republic. It has about 200 inhabitants.

== Demographics ==
Historical population
Year	Pop.	±%
1869	395	—
1880	417	+5.6%
1890	425	+1.9%
1900	340	−20.0%
1910	336	−1.2%
1921	314	−6.5%
1930	254	−19.1%
1950	211	−16.9%
1961	203	−3.8%
1970	199	−2.0%
1980	175	−12.1%
1991	174	−0.6%
2001	171	−1.7%
2011	170	−0.6%
2021	161	−5.3%
Source: Censuses
