= Rohoznice (Jičín District) =

- Municipality
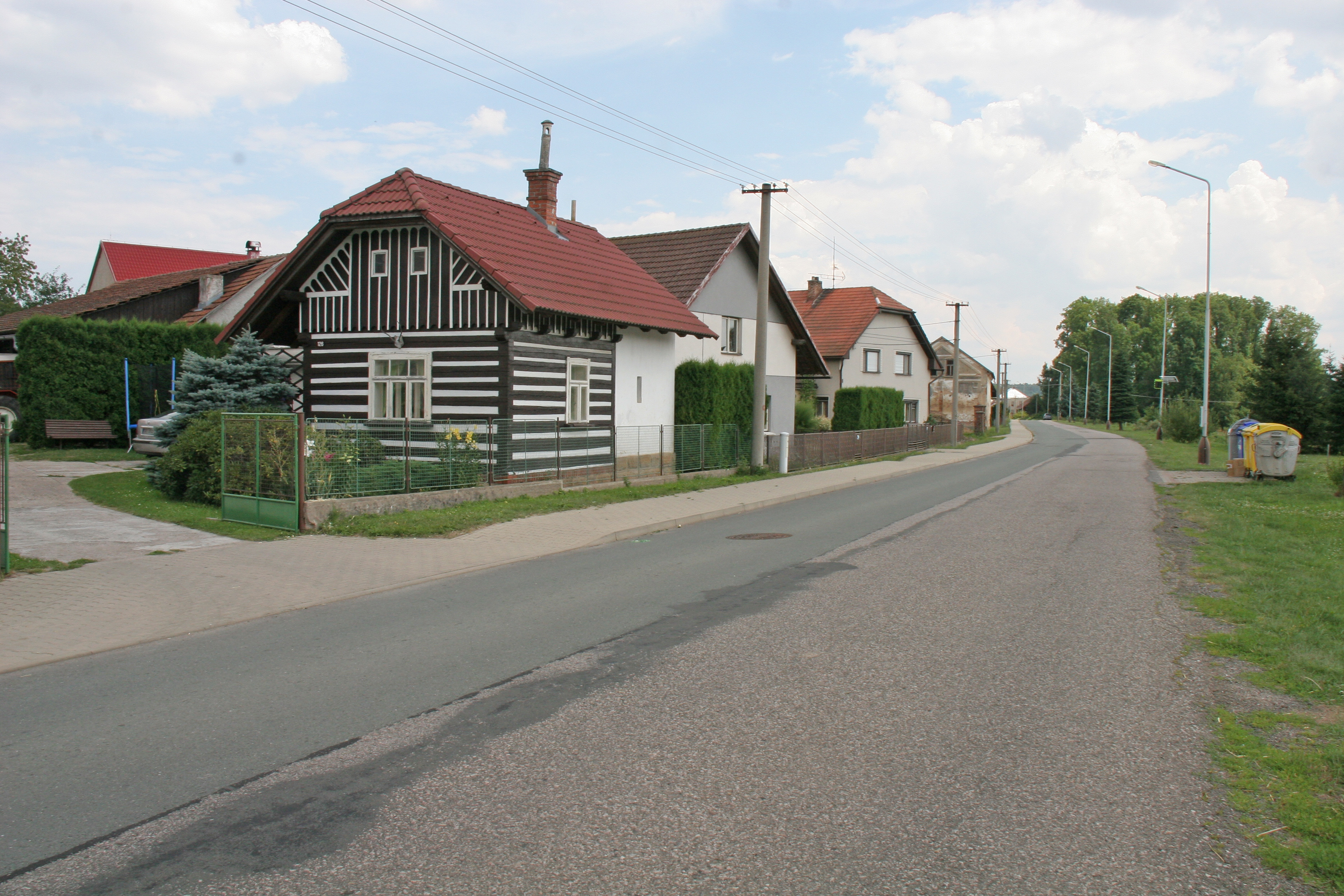
- Main street

- Location in the Czech Republic
- Coordinates: 50°23′30″N 15°41′59″E
- Country: Czech Republic
- Region: Hradec Králové
- District: Jičín
- First mentioned: 1267

Area
  - Total: 8.90 km^{2} (3.44 sq mi)
- Elevation: 301 m (988 ft)

Population (2026-01-01)
  - Total: 325
  - Density: 36.5/km^{2} (94.6/sq mi)
- Time zone: UTC+1 (CET)
  - Summer (DST): UTC+2 (CEST)
- Postal code: 507 71
- Website: www.rohoznice.eu

Rohoznice is a municipality and village in Jičín District in the Hradec Králové Region of the Czech Republic. It has about 300 inhabitants.

== Demographics ==
Historical population
Year	Pop.	±%
1869	672	—
1880	639	−4.9%
1890	637	−0.3%
1900	607	−4.7%
1910	658	+8.4%
1921	663	+0.8%
1930	583	−12.1%
1950	451	−22.6%
1961	417	−7.5%
1970	382	−8.4%
1980	336	−12.0%
1991	310	−7.7%
2001	293	−5.5%
2011	314	+7.2%
2021	321	+2.2%
Source: Censuses
