= Tetín (Jičín District) =

- Municipality
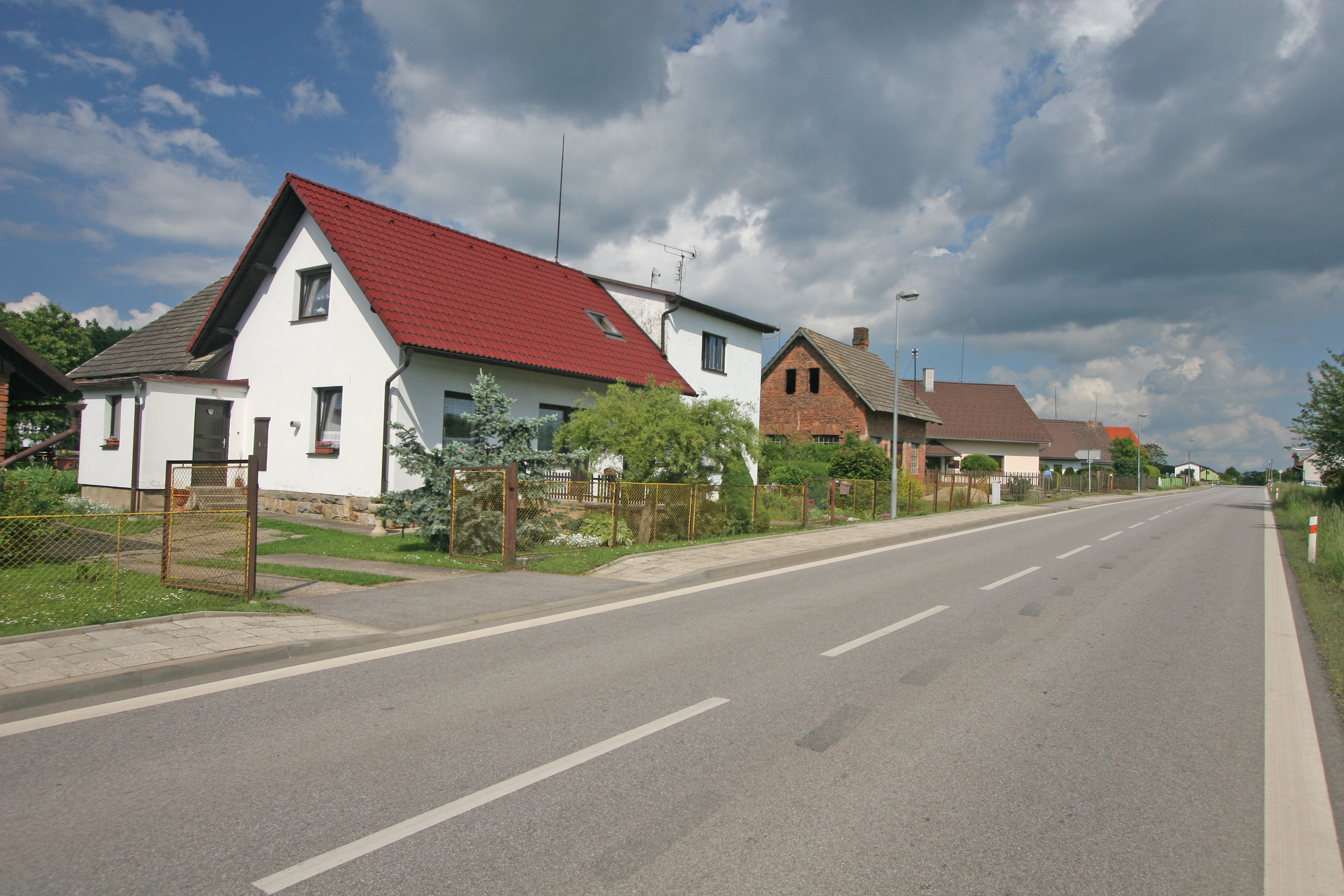
- Main road

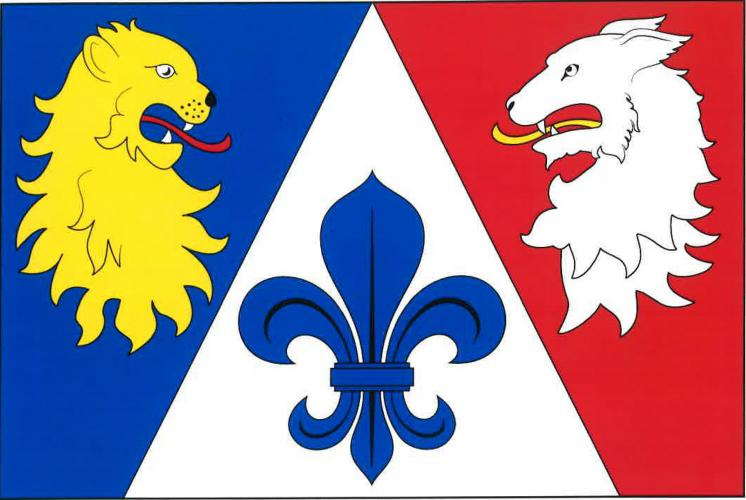
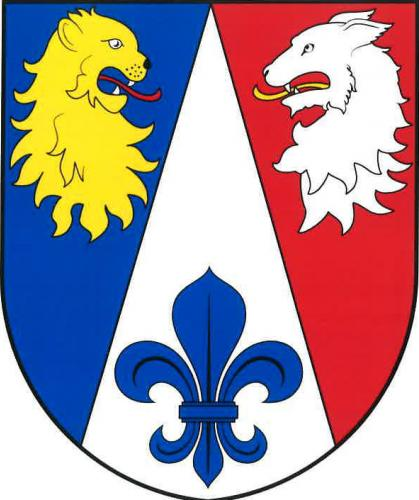
- Flag Coat of arms

- Location in the Czech Republic
- Coordinates: 50°25′30″N 15°37′56″E
- Country: Czech Republic
- Region: Hradec Králové
- District: Jičín
- First mentioned: 1629

Area
  - Total: 2.81 km^{2} (1.08 sq mi)
- Elevation: 340 m (1,120 ft)

Population (2026-01-01)
  - Total: 156
  - Density: 55.5/km^{2} (144/sq mi)
- Time zone: UTC+1 (CET)
  - Summer (DST): UTC+2 (CEST)
- Postal code: 507 71
- Website: tetin-jc.cz

Tetín is a municipality and village in Jičín District in the Hradec Králové Region of the Czech Republic. It has about 200 inhabitants.

== Administrative division ==
Tetín consists of two municipal parts (in brackets population according to the 2021 census):

- Tetín (105)
- Vidoň (53)

== Demographics ==
Historical population
| Year | Pop. | ±% |
|---|---|---|
| 1869 | 441 | — |
| 1880 | 439 | −0.5% |
| 1890 | 432 | −1.6% |
| 1900 | 370 | −14.4% |
| 1910 | 396 | +7.0% |
| 1921 | 362 | −8.6% |
| 1930 | 362 | +0.0% |
| 1950 | 267 | −26.2% |
| 1961 | 275 | +3.0% |
| 1970 | 239 | −13.1% |
| 1980 | 170 | −28.9% |
| 1991 | 136 | −20.0% |
| 2001 | 128 | −5.9% |
| 2011 | 140 | +9.4% |
| 2021 | 158 | +12.9% |
Source: Censuses
