= Holín =

- Municipality
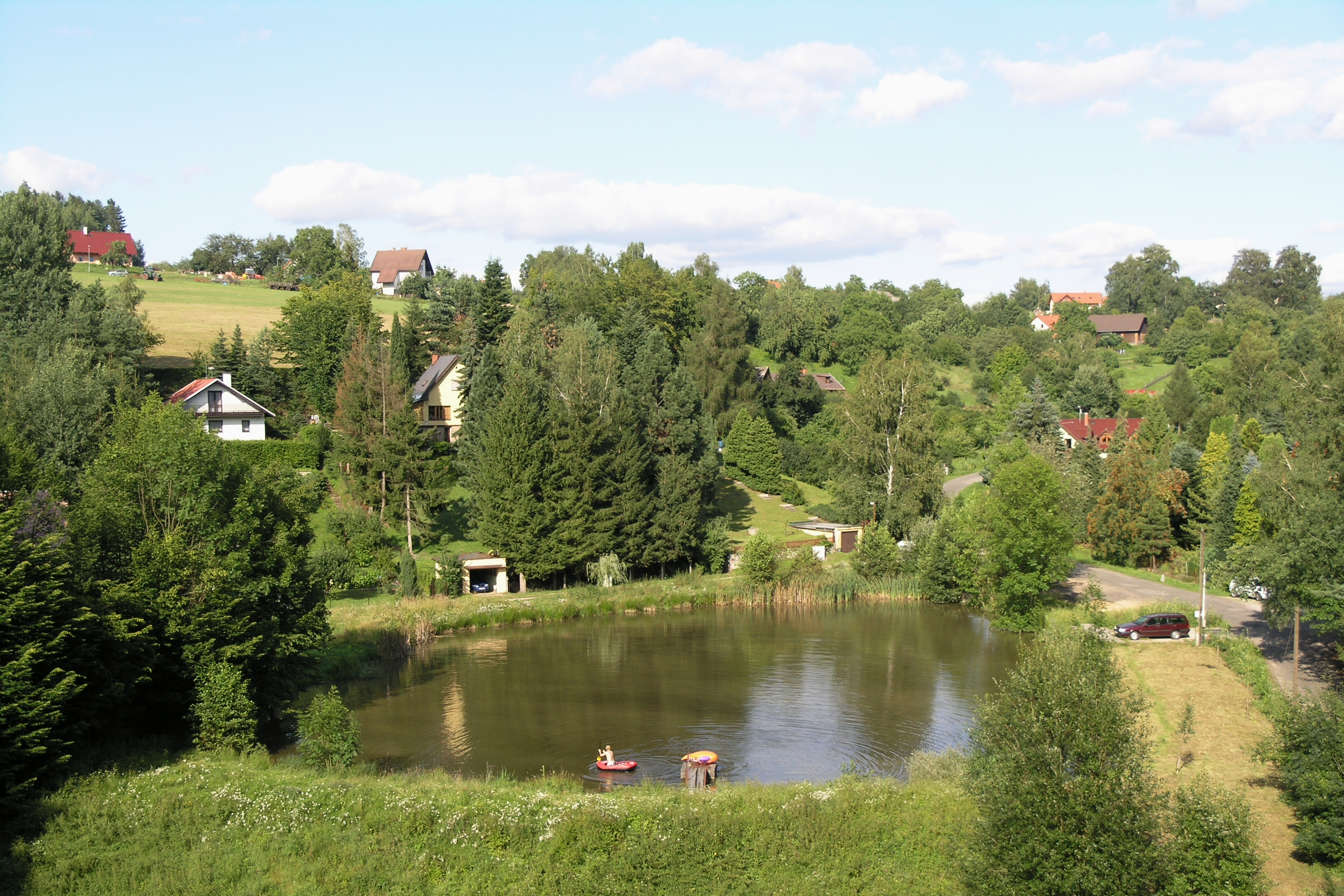
- Pařezská Lhota, a part of Holín

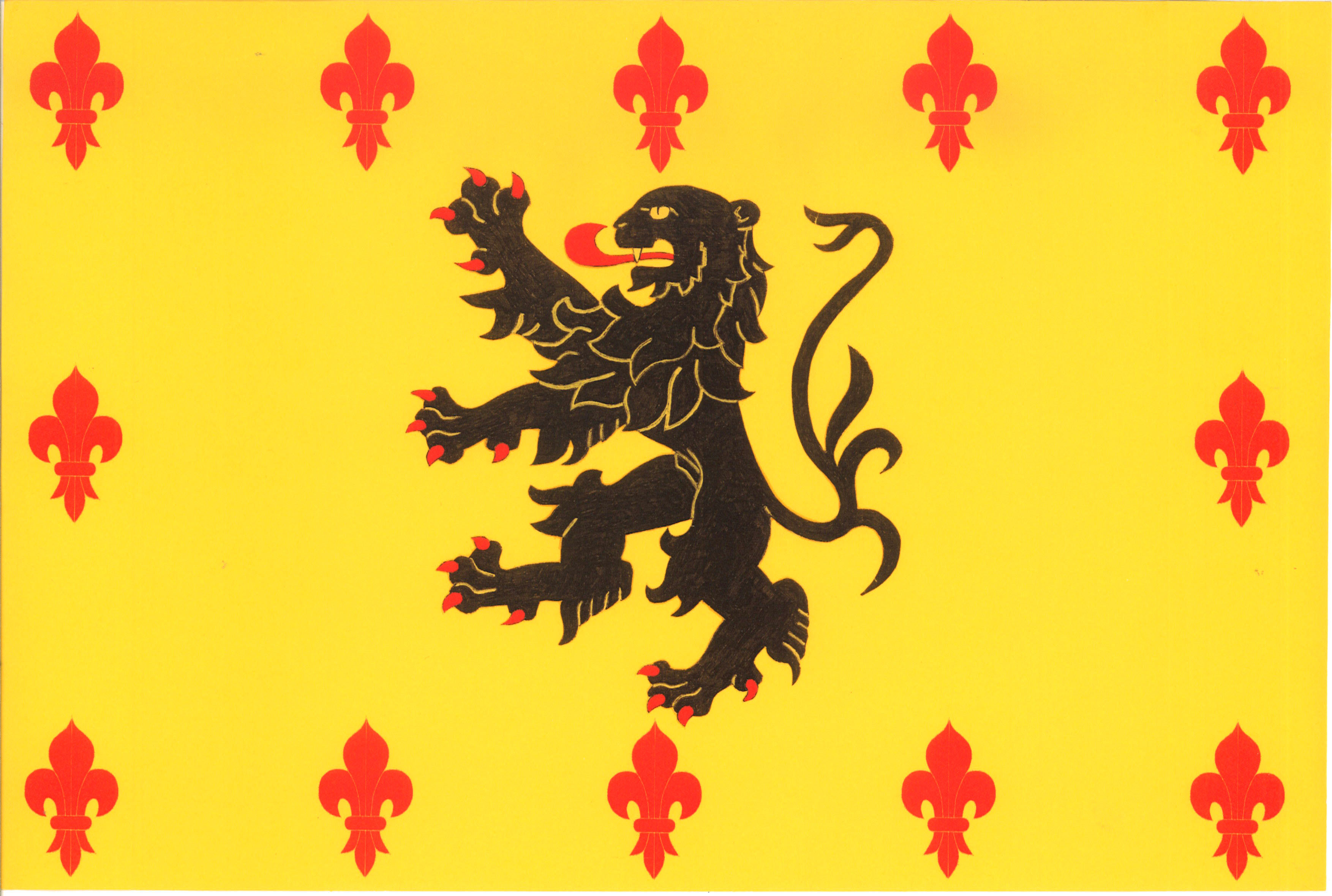
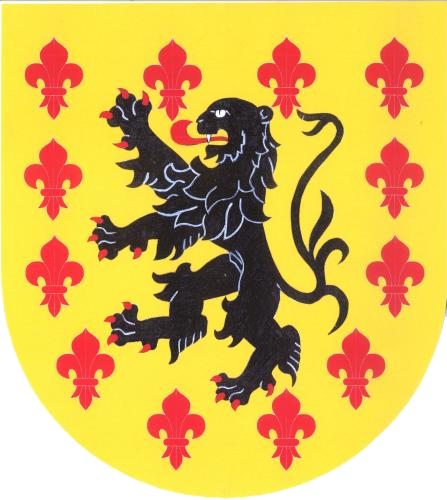
- Flag Coat of arms

- Location in the Czech Republic
- Coordinates: 50°27′6″N 15°19′15″E
- Country: Czech Republic
- Region: Hradec Králové
- District: Jičín
- First mentioned: 1327

Area
  - Total: 10.41 km^{2} (4.02 sq mi)
- Elevation: 286 m (938 ft)

Population (2026-01-01)
  - Total: 624
  - Density: 59.9/km^{2} (155/sq mi)
- Time zone: UTC+1 (CET)
  - Summer (DST): UTC+2 (CEST)
- Postal code: 506 01
- Website: holin.cz

Holín is a municipality and village in Jičín District in the Hradec Králové Region of the Czech Republic. It has about 600 inhabitants.

== Administrative division ==
Holín consists of four municipal parts (in brackets population according to the 2021 census):

- Holín (335)
- Horní Lochov (52)
- Pařezská Lhota (102)
- Prachov (128)

== Demographics ==
Historical population
Year	Pop.	±%
1869	867	—
1880	917	+5.8%
1890	983	+7.2%
1900	939	−4.5%
1910	887	−5.5%
1921	817	−7.9%
1930	775	−5.1%
1950	722	−6.8%
1961	638	−11.6%
1970	551	−13.6%
1980	484	−12.2%
1991	509	+5.2%
2001	526	+3.3%
2011	589	+12.0%
2021	617	+4.8%
Source: Censuses
