= Vřesník =

- Municipality
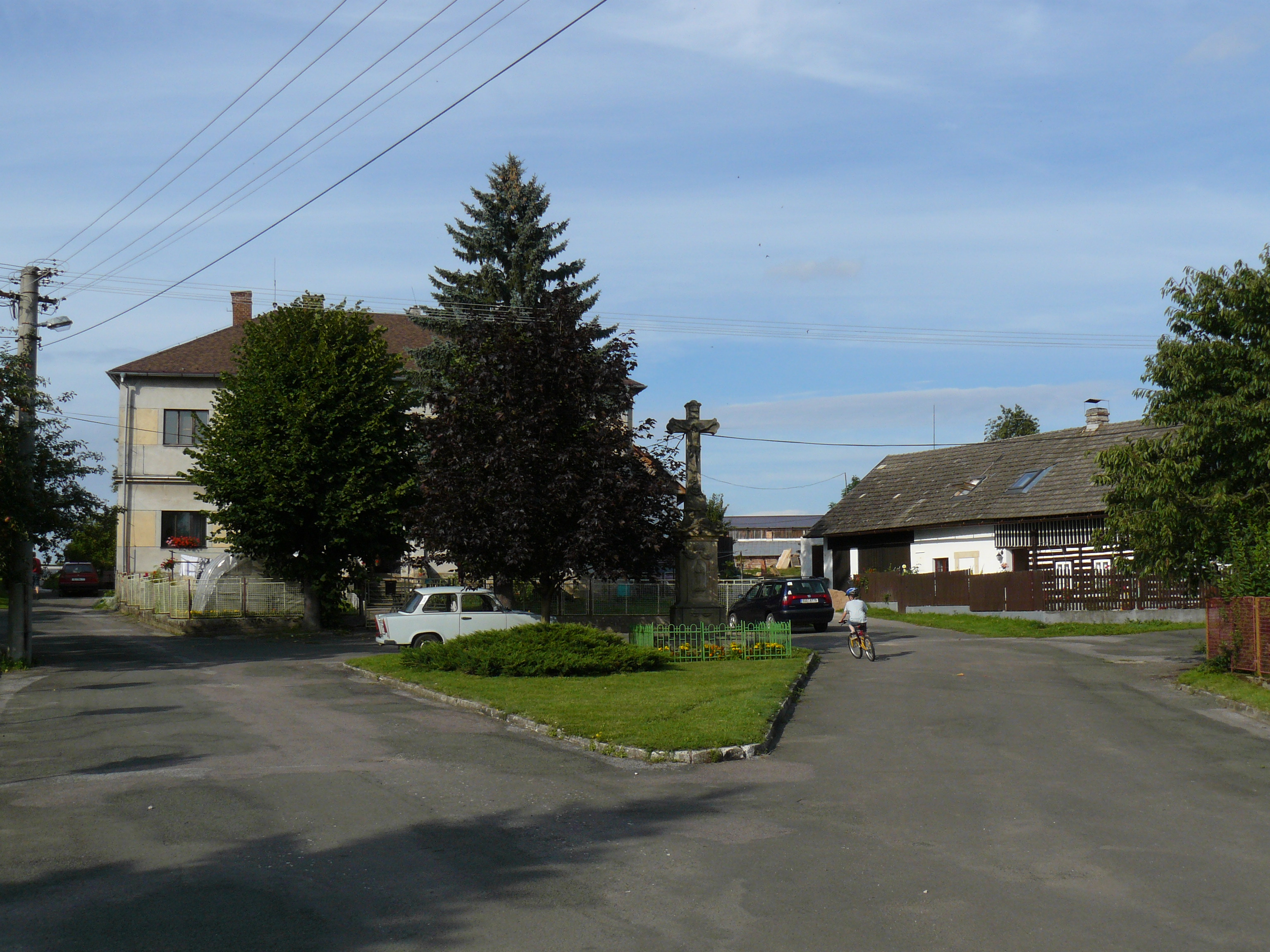
- Centre of Vřesník

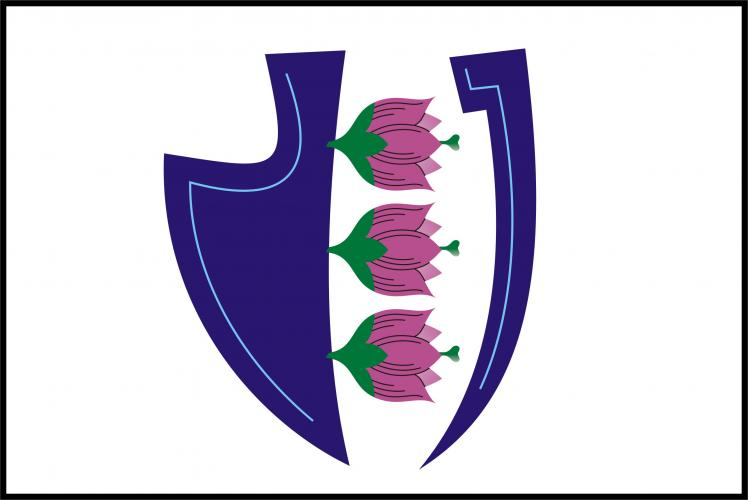
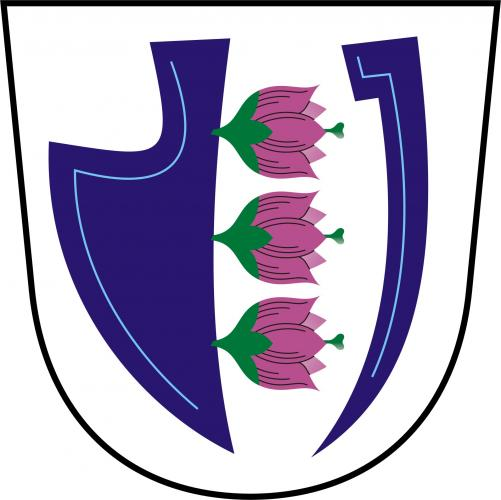
- Flag Coat of arms

- Location in the Czech Republic
- Coordinates: 50°26′17″N 15°37′42″E
- Country: Czech Republic
- Region: Hradec Králové
- District: Jičín
- First mentioned: 1338

Area
  - Total: 3.10 km^{2} (1.20 sq mi)
- Elevation: 426 m (1,398 ft)

Population (2026-01-01)
  - Total: 102
  - Density: 32.9/km^{2} (85.2/sq mi)
- Time zone: UTC+1 (CET)
  - Summer (DST): UTC+2 (CEST)
- Postal code: 507 71
- Website: www.obecvresnik.cz

Vřesník is a municipality and village in Jičín District in the Hradec Králové Region of the Czech Republic. It has about 100 inhabitants.

== Demographics ==
Historical population
Year	Pop.	±%
1869	212	—
1880	212	+0.0%
1890	278	+31.1%
1900	248	−10.8%
1910	225	−9.3%
1921	213	−5.3%
1930	188	−11.7%
1950	130	−30.9%
1961	123	−5.4%
1970	116	−5.7%
1980	117	+0.9%
1991	107	−8.5%
2001	96	−10.3%
2011	86	−10.4%
2021	99	+15.1%
Source: Censuses
