= Kyje (Jičín District) =

- Municipality
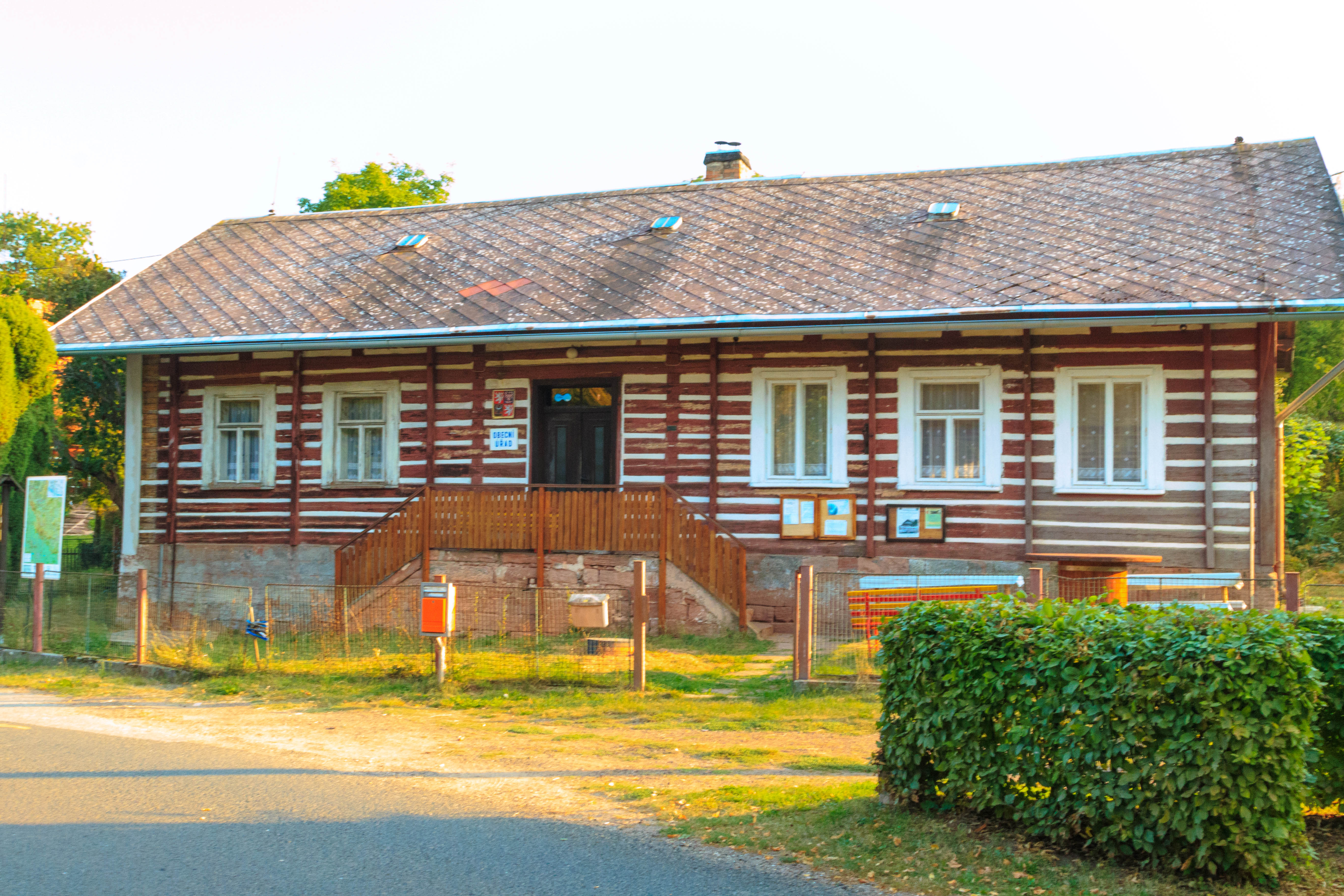
- Municipal office

- Location in the Czech Republic
- Coordinates: 50°29′40″N 15°22′41″E
- Country: Czech Republic
- Region: Hradec Králové
- District: Jičín
- First mentioned: 1539

Area
  - Total: 1.59 km^{2} (0.61 sq mi)
- Elevation: 423 m (1,388 ft)

Population (2026-01-01)
  - Total: 90
  - Density: 57/km^{2} (150/sq mi)
- Time zone: UTC+1 (CET)
  - Summer (DST): UTC+2 (CEST)
- Postal code: 507 13
- Website: www.obeckyje.cz

Kyje is a municipality and village in Jičín District in the Hradec Králové Region of the Czech Republic. It has about 90 inhabitants.

== Demographics ==
Historical population
Year	Pop.	±%
1869	338	—
1880	323	−4.4%
1890	297	−8.0%
1900	271	−8.8%
1910	261	−3.7%
1921	228	−12.6%
1930	196	−14.0%
1950	126	−35.7%
1961	102	−19.0%
1970	82	−19.6%
1980	68	−17.1%
1991	43	−36.8%
2001	46	+7.0%
2011	79	+71.7%
2021	75	−5.1%
Source: Censuses
