= Budčeves =

- Municipality
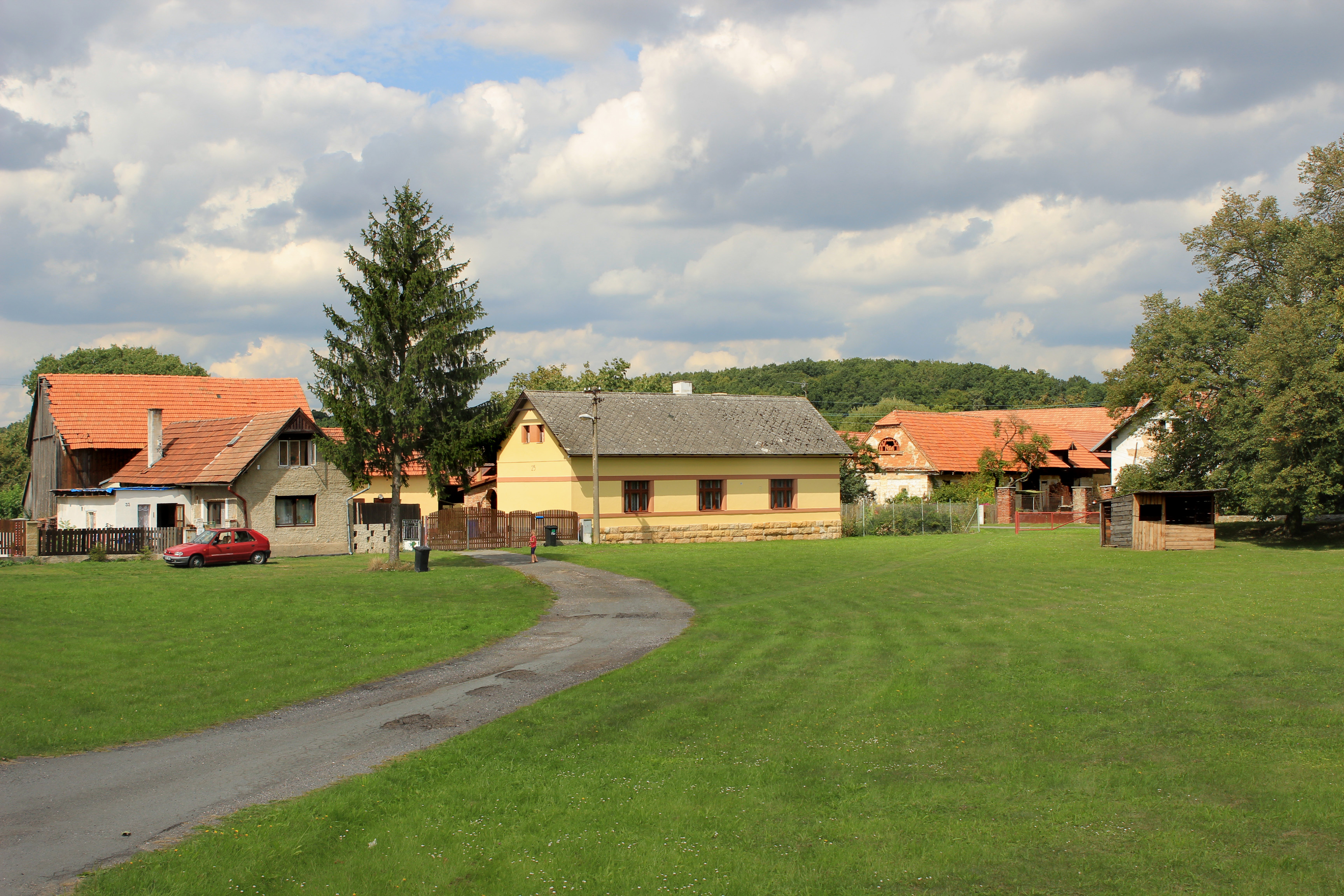
- Centre of Budčeves

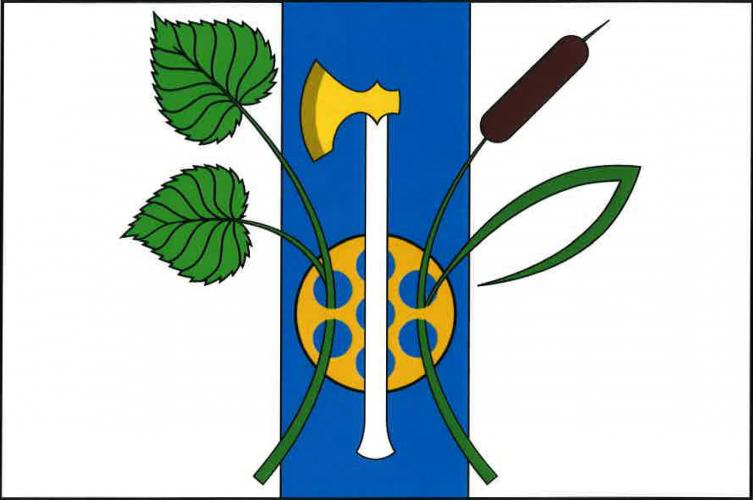
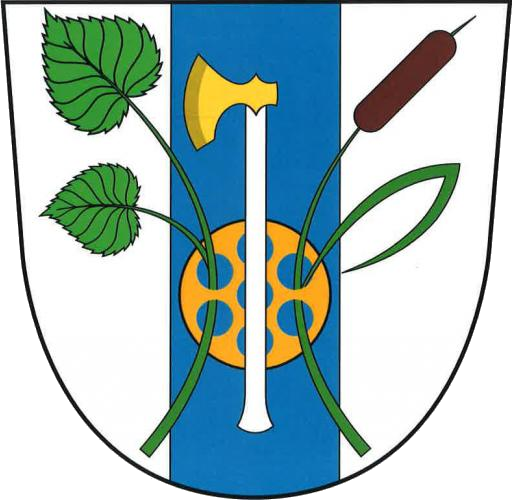
- Flag Coat of arms

- Location in the Czech Republic
- Coordinates: 50°18′31″N 15°15′17″E
- Country: Czech Republic
- Region: Hradec Králové
- District: Jičín
- First mentioned: 1349

Area
  - Total: 6.71 km^{2} (2.59 sq mi)
- Elevation: 212 m (696 ft)

Population (2026-01-01)
  - Total: 158
  - Density: 23.5/km^{2} (61.0/sq mi)
- Time zone: UTC+1 (CET)
  - Summer (DST): UTC+2 (CEST)
- Postal code: 507 32
- Website: www.budceves.cz

Budčeves is a municipality and village in Jičín District in the Hradec Králové Region of the Czech Republic. It has about 200 inhabitants.

== Administrative division ==
Budčeves consists of two municipal parts (in brackets population according to the 2021 census):

- Budčeves (133)
- Nečas (15)

== Demographics ==
Historical population
| Year | Pop. | ±% |
|---|---|---|
| 1869 | 378 | — |
| 1880 | 462 | +22.2% |
| 1890 | 472 | +2.2% |
| 1900 | 410 | −13.1% |
| 1910 | 398 | −2.9% |
| 1921 | 371 | −6.8% |
| 1930 | 347 | −6.5% |
| 1950 | 272 | −21.6% |
| 1961 | 306 | +12.5% |
| 1970 | 251 | −18.0% |
| 1980 | 219 | −12.7% |
| 1991 | 211 | −3.7% |
| 2001 | 186 | −11.8% |
| 2011 | 155 | −16.7% |
| 2021 | 148 | −4.5% |
Source: Censuses
