= Bříšťany =

- Municipality
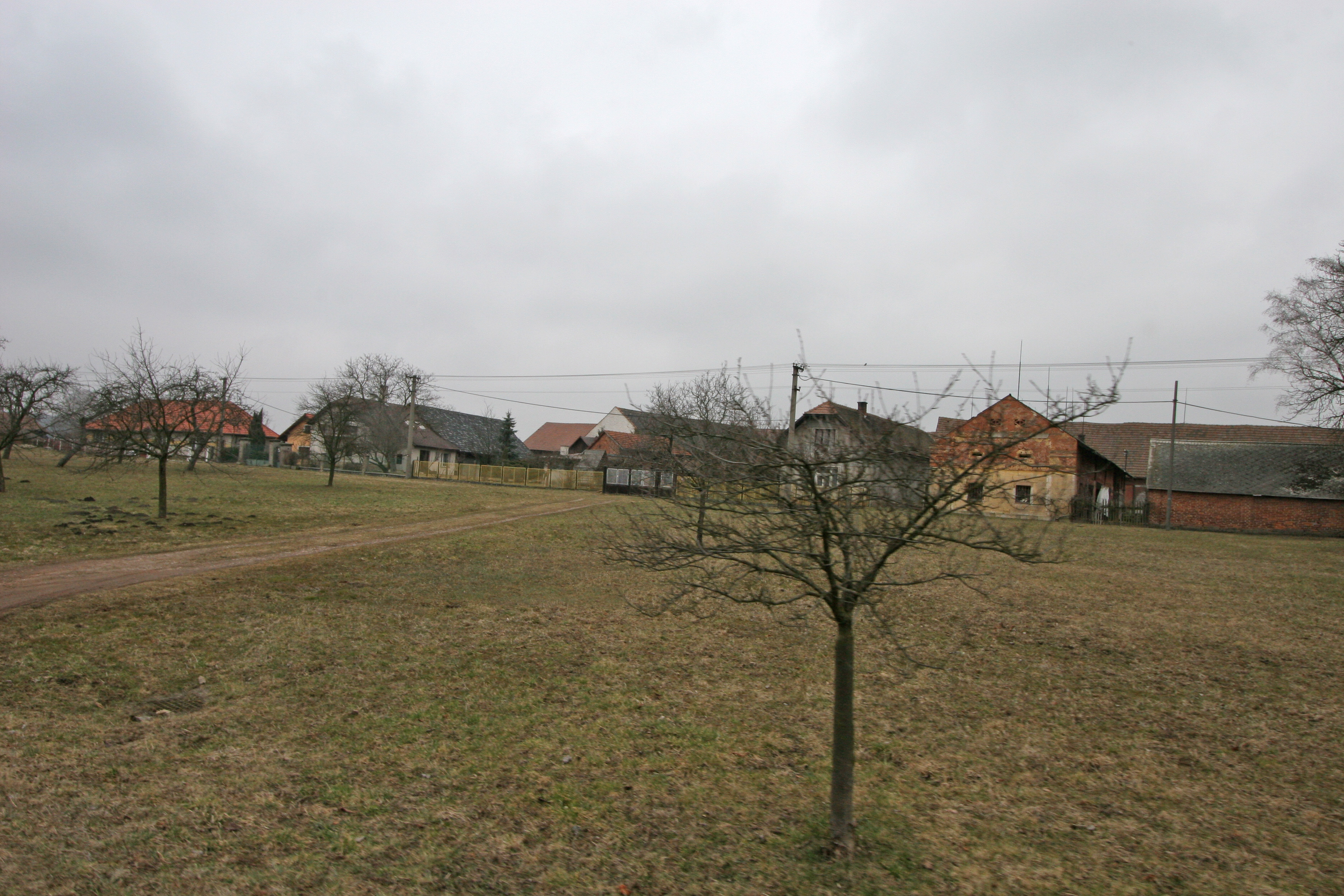
- Centre of Bříšťany

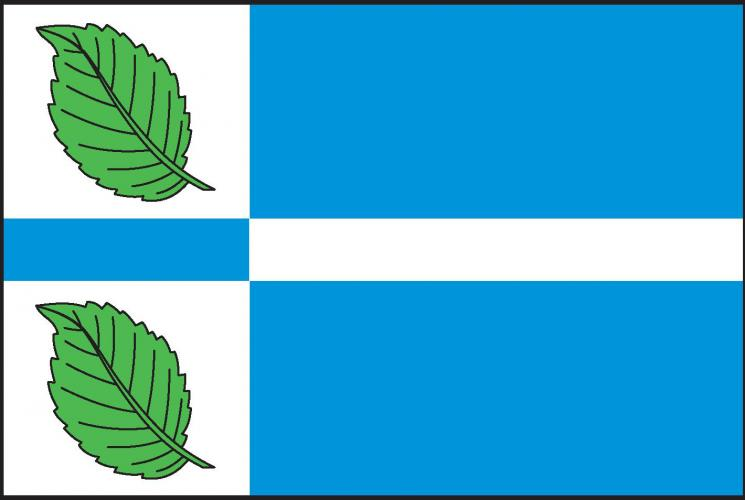
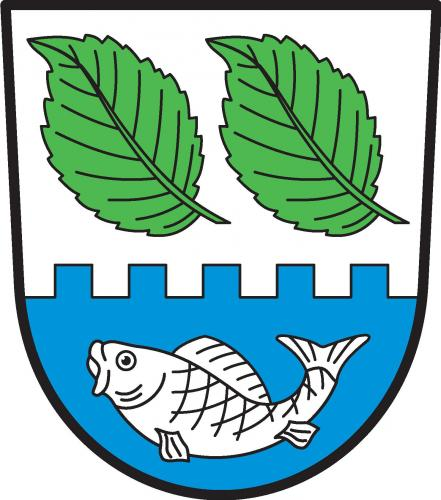
- Flag Coat of arms

- Location in the Czech Republic
- Coordinates: 50°18′59″N 15°37′15″E
- Country: Czech Republic
- Region: Hradec Králové
- District: Jičín
- First mentioned: 1219

Area
  - Total: 3.69 km^{2} (1.42 sq mi)
- Elevation: 262 m (860 ft)

Population (2026-01-01)
  - Total: 249
  - Density: 67.5/km^{2} (175/sq mi)
- Time zone: UTC+1 (CET)
  - Summer (DST): UTC+2 (CEST)
- Postal code: 508 01
- Website: bristany.cz

Bříšťany is a municipality and village in Jičín District in the Hradec Králové Region of the Czech Republic. It has about 200 inhabitants.

== Demographics ==
Historical population
Year	Pop.	±%
1869	427	—
1880	494	+15.7%
1890	512	+3.6%
1900	536	+4.7%
1910	513	−4.3%
1921	515	+0.4%
1930	439	−14.8%
1950	349	−20.5%
1961	347	−0.6%
1970	308	−11.2%
1980	259	−15.9%
1991	241	−6.9%
2001	224	−7.1%
2011	233	+4.0%
2021	238	+2.1%
Source: Censuses
