= Nevratice =

- Municipality
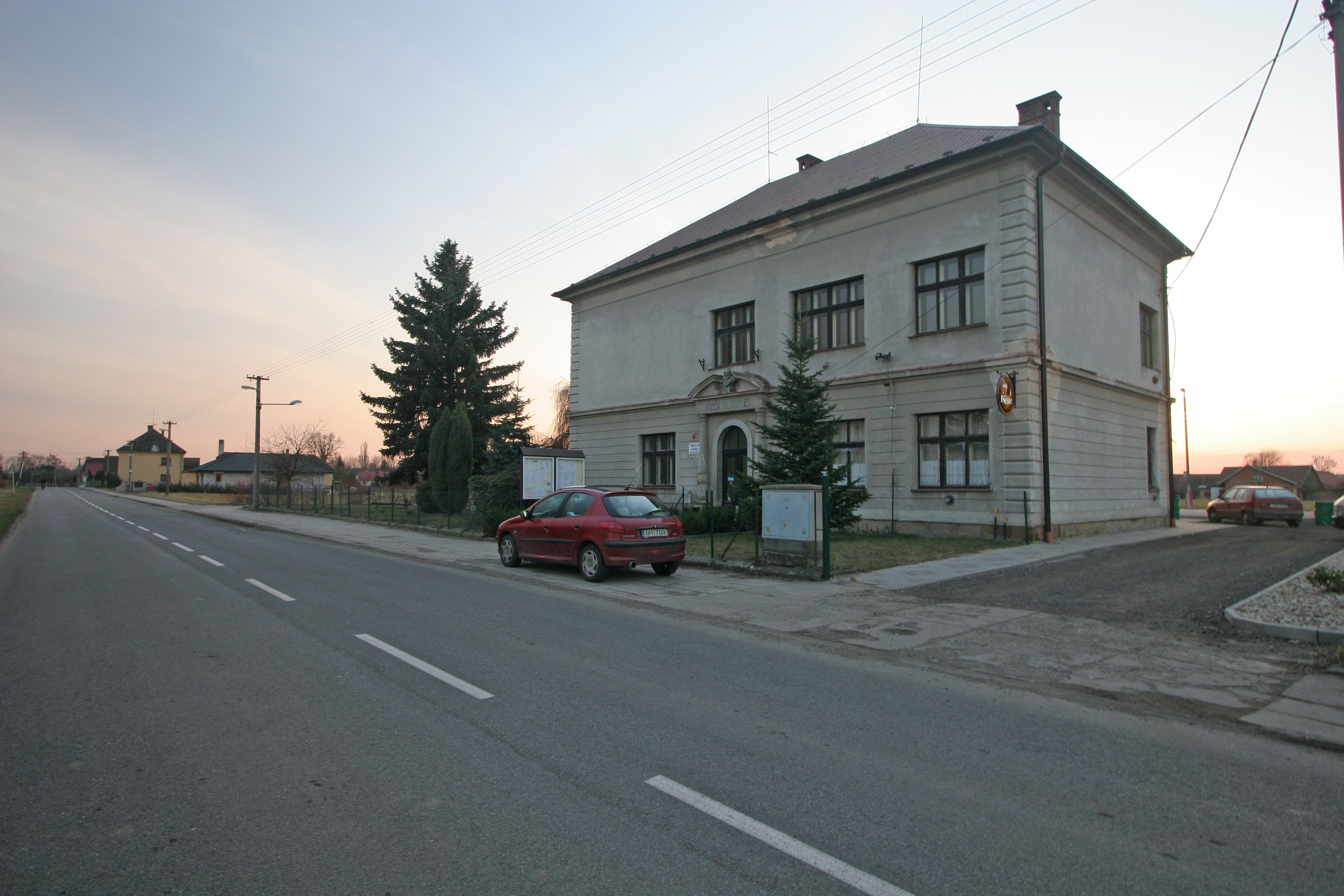
- Municipal office

- Location in the Czech Republic
- Coordinates: 50°20′49″N 15°29′35″E
- Country: Czech Republic
- Region: Hradec Králové
- District: Jičín
- First mentioned: 1398

Area
  - Total: 3.25 km^{2} (1.25 sq mi)
- Elevation: 246 m (807 ft)

Population (2026-01-01)
  - Total: 191
  - Density: 58.8/km^{2} (152/sq mi)
- Time zone: UTC+1 (CET)
  - Summer (DST): UTC+2 (CEST)
- Postal code: 508 01
- Website: www.obecnevratice.cz

Nevratice is a municipality and village in Jičín District in the Hradec Králové Region of the Czech Republic. It has about 200 inhabitants.

== Demographics ==
Historical population
Year	Pop.	±%
1869	529	—
1880	519	−1.9%
1890	507	−2.3%
1900	477	−5.9%
1910	484	+1.5%
1921	463	−4.3%
1930	431	−6.9%
1950	324	−24.8%
1961	298	−8.0%
1970	283	−5.0%
1980	236	−16.6%
1991	162	−31.4%
2001	145	−10.5%
2011	156	+7.6%
2021	177	+13.5%
Source: Censuses
