= Samšina =

- Municipality
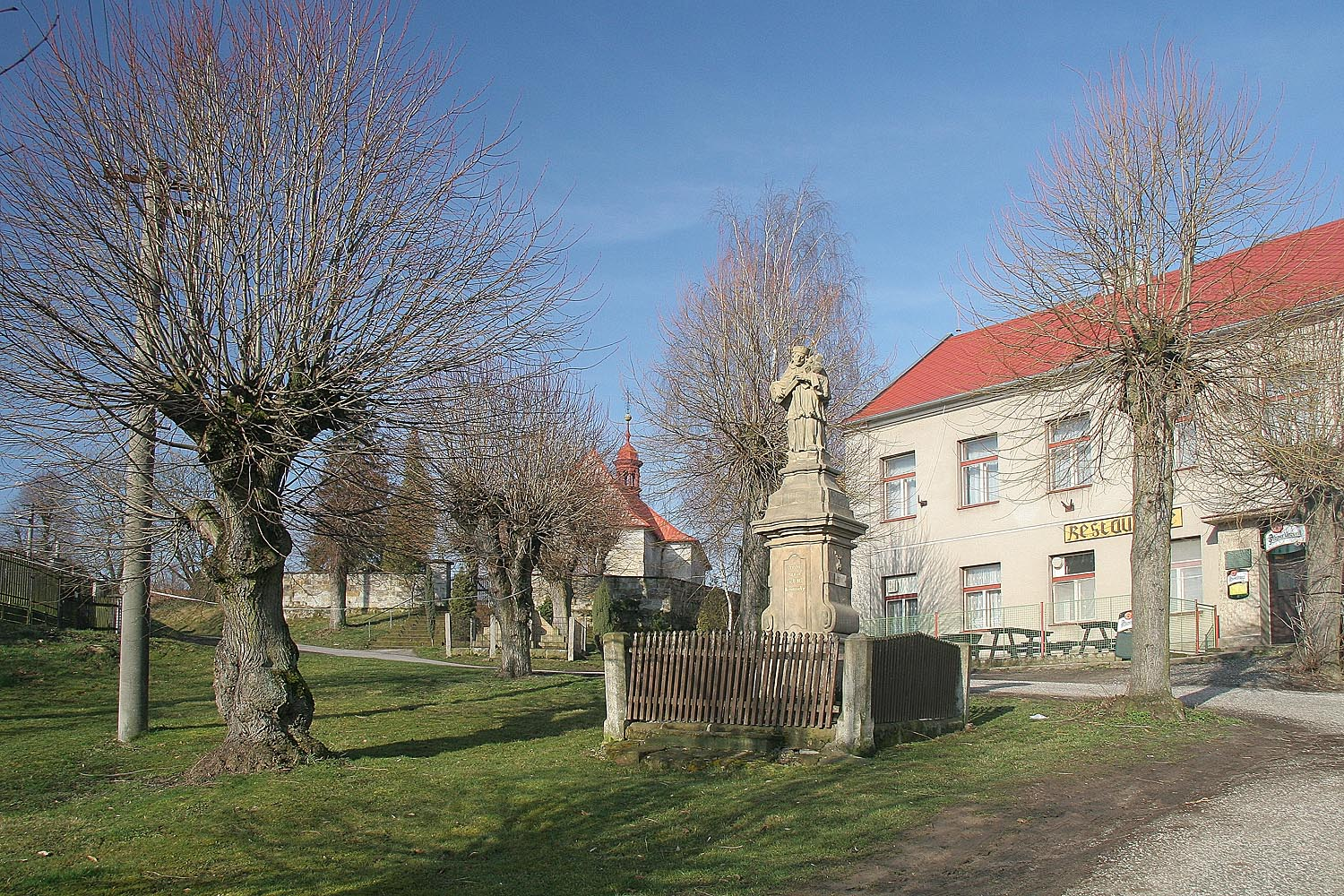
- Centre of Samšina

- Location in the Czech Republic
- Coordinates: 50°27′34″N 15°14′6″E
- Country: Czech Republic
- Region: Hradec Králové
- District: Jičín
- First mentioned: 1352

Area
  - Total: 6.74 km^{2} (2.60 sq mi)
- Elevation: 312 m (1,024 ft)

Population (2026-01-01)
  - Total: 272
  - Density: 40.4/km^{2} (105/sq mi)
- Time zone: UTC+1 (CET)
  - Summer (DST): UTC+2 (CEST)
- Postal code: 506 01
- Website: www.samsina.nasweb.eu

Samšina is a municipality and village in Jičín District in the Hradec Králové Region of the Czech Republic. It has about 300 inhabitants.

== Administrative division ==
Samšina consists of five municipal parts (in brackets population according to the 2021 census):

- Samšina (136)
- Betlem (17)
- Drštěkryje (25)
- Plhov (70)
- Všeliby (11)

== Demographics ==
Historical population
Year	Pop.	±%
1869	952	—
1880	827	−13.1%
1890	810	−2.1%
1900	776	−4.2%
1910	761	−1.9%
1921	711	−6.6%
1930	638	−10.3%
1950	431	−32.4%
1961	435	+0.9%
1970	339	−22.1%
1980	306	−9.7%
1991	238	−22.2%
2001	234	−1.7%
2011	248	+6.0%
2021	259	+4.4%
Source: Censuses
