= Ohařice =

- Municipality
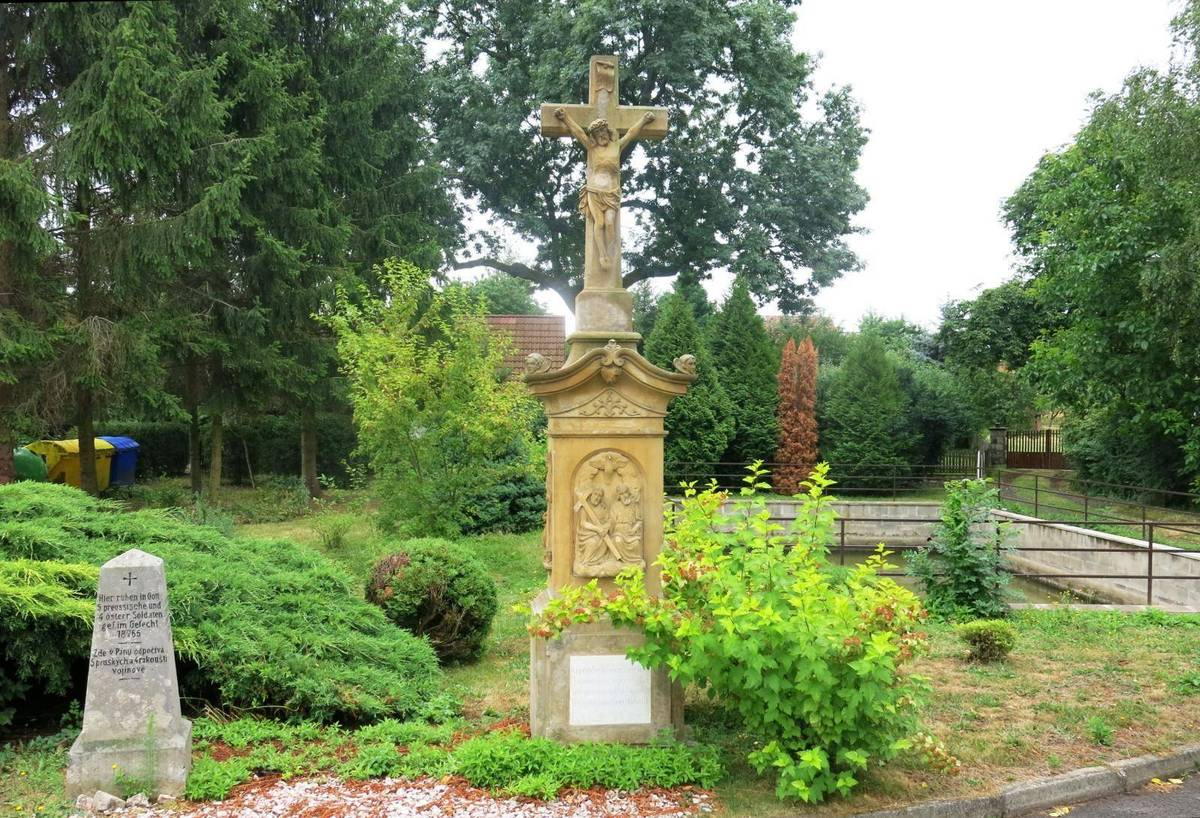
- Cross and Memorial to the Fallen in 1866

- Location in the Czech Republic
- Coordinates: 50°27′16″N 15°15′31″E
- Country: Czech Republic
- Region: Hradec Králové
- District: Jičín
- First mentioned: 1543

Area
  - Total: 4.16 km^{2} (1.61 sq mi)
- Elevation: 325 m (1,066 ft)

Population (2026-01-01)
  - Total: 79
  - Density: 19/km^{2} (49/sq mi)
- Time zone: UTC+1 (CET)
  - Summer (DST): UTC+2 (CEST)
- Postal code: 506 01
- Website: www.oharice.cz

Ohařice is a municipality and village in Jičín District in the Hradec Králové Region of the Czech Republic. It has about 80 inhabitants.

== Demographics ==
Historical population
Year	Pop.	±%
1869	257	—
1880	253	−1.6%
1890	244	−3.6%
1900	234	−4.1%
1910	229	−2.1%
1921	212	−7.4%
1930	209	−1.4%
1950	154	−26.3%
1961	130	−15.6%
1970	114	−12.3%
1980	78	−31.6%
1991	60	−23.1%
2001	62	+3.3%
2011	68	+9.7%
2021	73	+7.4%
Source: Censuses
