= Kbelnice =

- Municipality
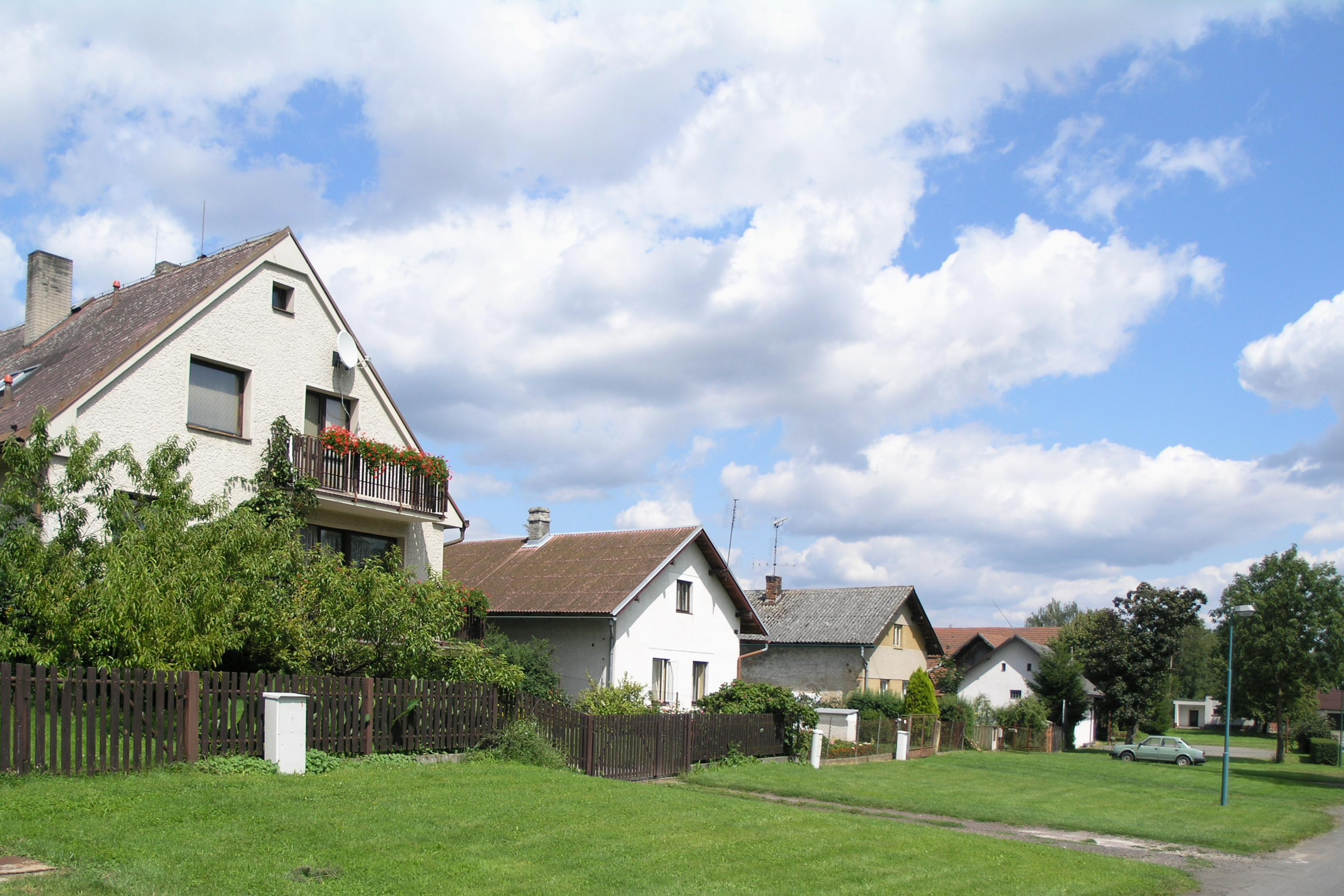
- Centre of Kbelnice

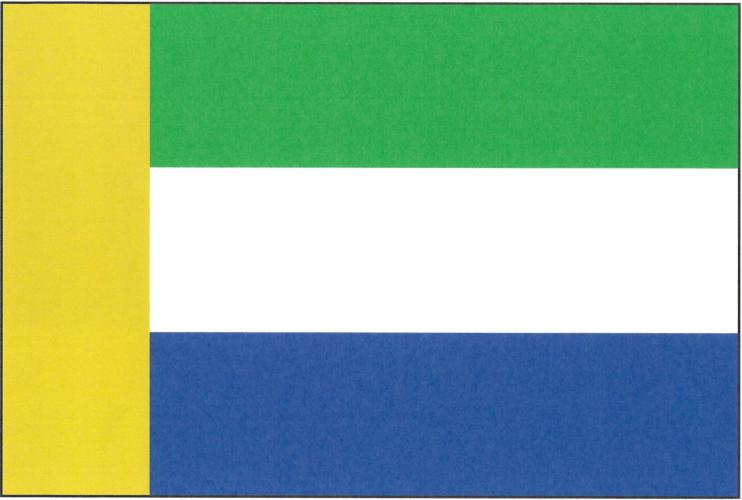
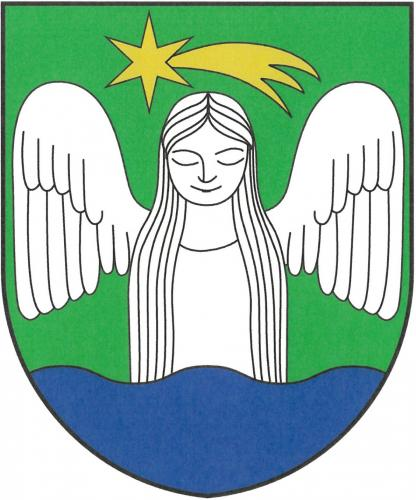
- Flag Coat of arms

- Location in the Czech Republic
- Coordinates: 50°27′18″N 15°21′3″E
- Country: Czech Republic
- Region: Hradec Králové
- District: Jičín
- First mentioned: 1322

Area
  - Total: 1.87 km^{2} (0.72 sq mi)
- Elevation: 294 m (965 ft)

Population (2026-01-01)
  - Total: 228
  - Density: 122/km^{2} (316/sq mi)
- Time zone: UTC+1 (CET)
  - Summer (DST): UTC+2 (CEST)
- Postal code: 506 01
- Website: www.obeckbelnice.cz

Kbelnice is a municipality and village in Jičín District in the Hradec Králové Region of the Czech Republic. It has about 200 inhabitants.

== Demographics ==
Historical population
Year	Pop.	±%
1869	278	—
1880	359	+29.1%
1890	374	+4.2%
1900	233	−37.7%
1910	344	+47.6%
1921	420	+22.1%
1930	270	−35.7%
1950	348	+28.9%
1961	155	−55.5%
1970	123	−20.6%
1980	123	+0.0%
1991	122	−0.8%
2001	127	+4.1%
2011	205	+61.4%
2021	219	+6.8%
Source: Censuses
