= Bašnice =

- Municipality
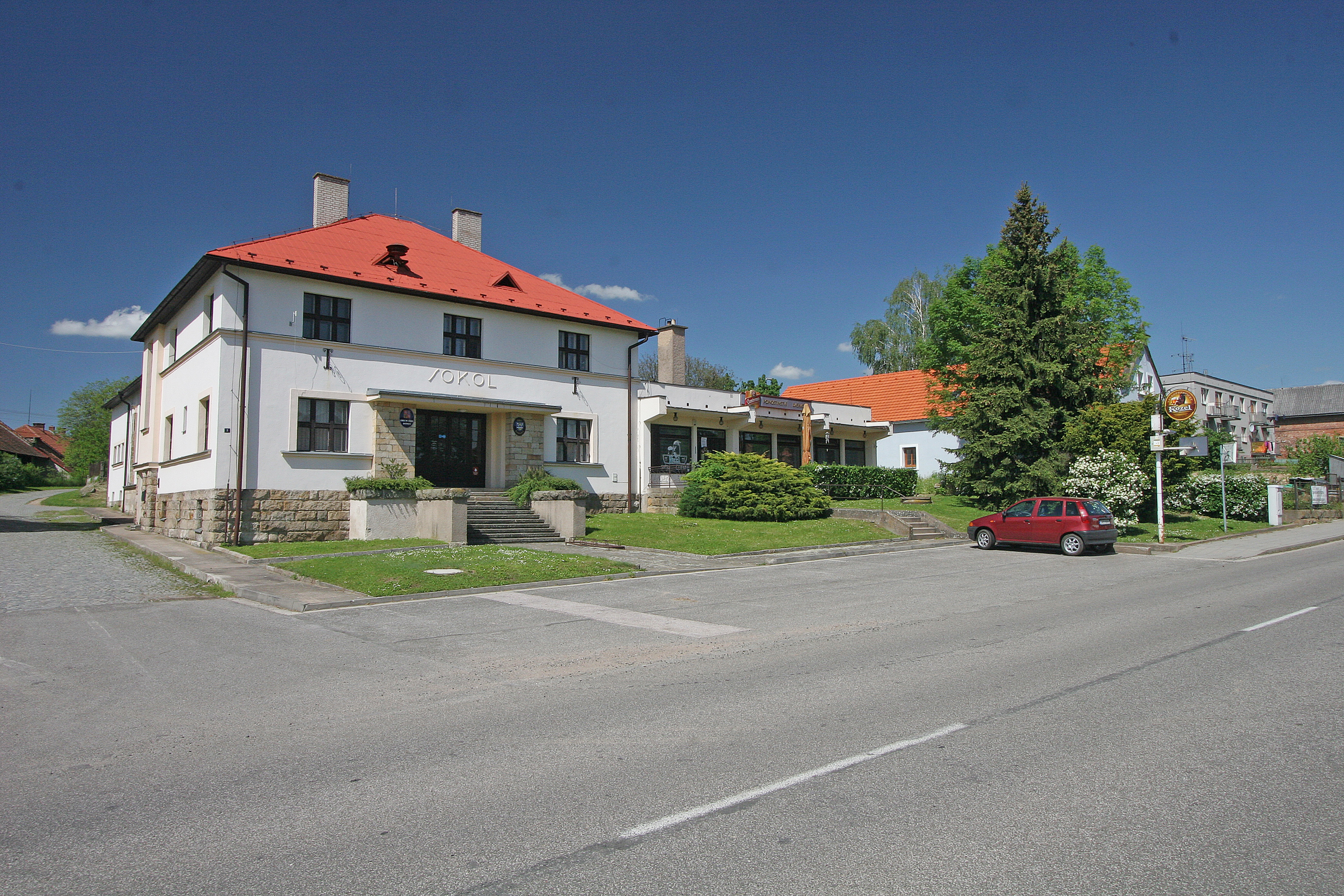
- Municipal office

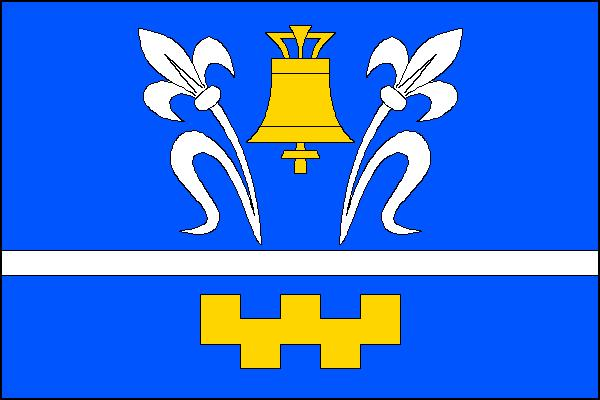
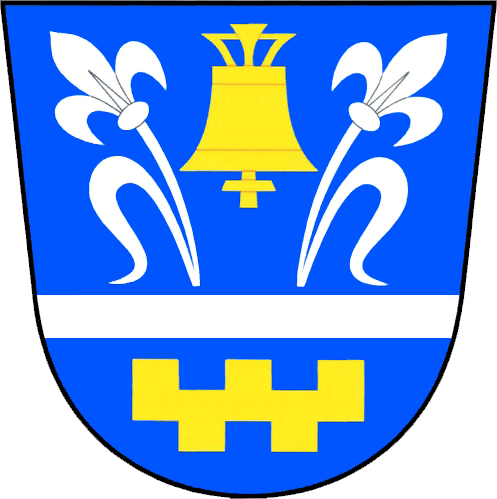
- Flag Coat of arms

- Location in the Czech Republic
- Coordinates: 50°20′4″N 15°36′18″E
- Country: Czech Republic
- Region: Hradec Králové
- District: Jičín
- First mentioned: 1318

Area
  - Total: 6.13 km^{2} (2.37 sq mi)
- Elevation: 266 m (873 ft)

Population (2026-01-01)
  - Total: 219
  - Density: 35.7/km^{2} (92.5/sq mi)
- Time zone: UTC+1 (CET)
  - Summer (DST): UTC+2 (CEST)
- Postal code: 508 01
- Website: www.obec-basnice.cz

Bašnice is a municipality and village in Jičín District in the Hradec Králové Region of the Czech Republic. It has about 200 inhabitants.

== Demographics ==
Historical population
Year	Pop.	±%
1869	321	—
1880	446	+38.9%
1890	458	+2.7%
1900	390	−14.8%
1910	429	+10.0%
1921	418	−2.6%
1930	396	−5.3%
1950	323	−18.4%
1961	285	−11.8%
1970	288	+1.1%
1980	259	−10.1%
1991	209	−19.3%
2001	197	−5.7%
2011	188	−4.6%
2021	203	+8.0%
Source: Censuses
