= Lískovice =

- Municipality
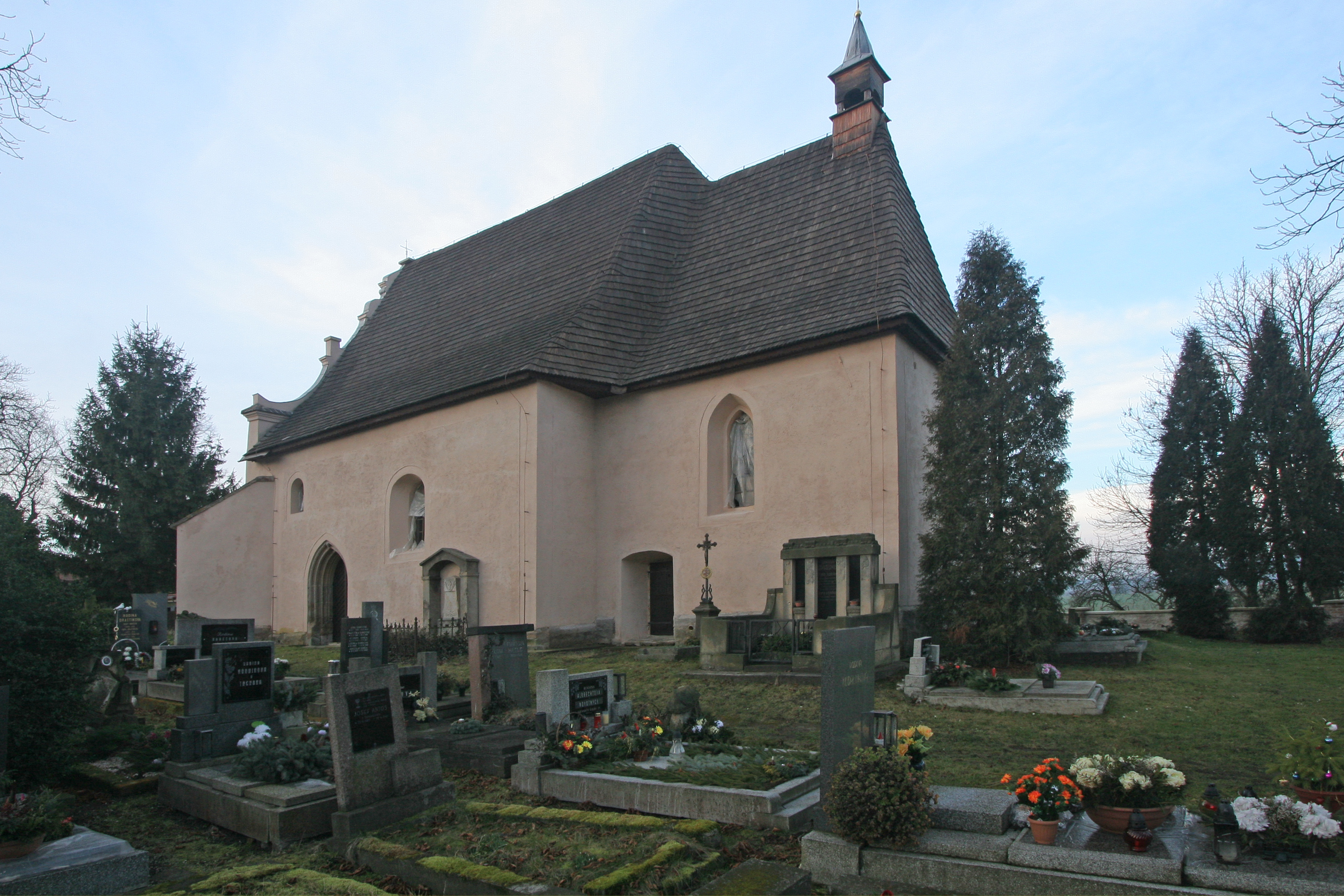
- Church of Saint Nicholas

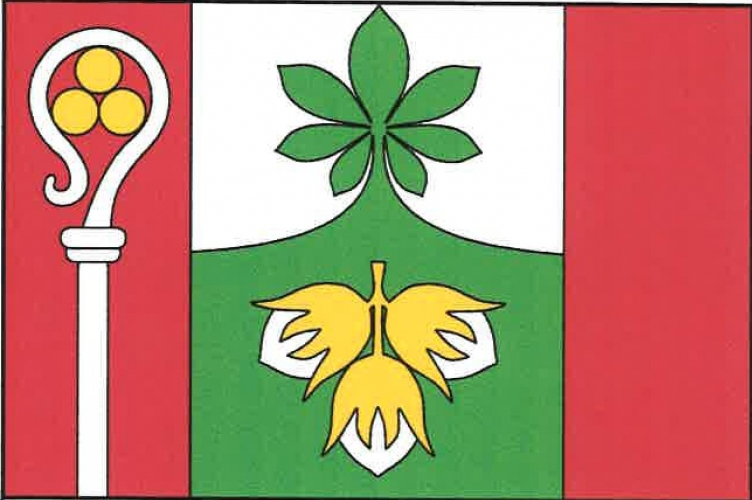
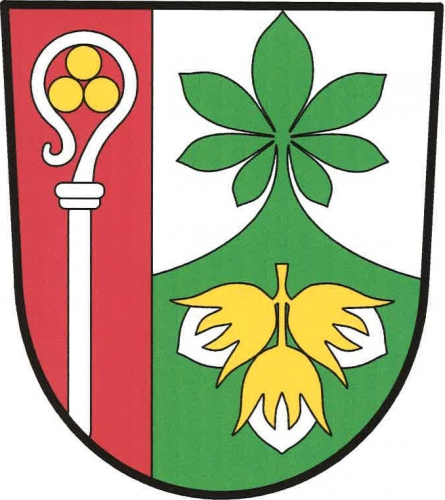
- Flag Coat of arms

- Location in the Czech Republic
- Coordinates: 50°20′13″N 15°33′18″E
- Country: Czech Republic
- Region: Hradec Králové
- District: Jičín
- First mentioned: 1295

Area
  - Total: 9.21 km^{2} (3.56 sq mi)
- Elevation: 264 m (866 ft)

Population (2026-01-01)
  - Total: 240
  - Density: 26/km^{2} (67/sq mi)
- Time zone: UTC+1 (CET)
  - Summer (DST): UTC+2 (CEST)
- Postal code: 508 01
- Website: www.liskovice.cz

Lískovice is a municipality and village in Jičín District in the Hradec Králové Region of the Czech Republic. It has about 200 inhabitants.

== Administrative division ==
Lískovice consists of two municipal parts (in brackets population according to the 2021 census):

- Lískovice (141)
- Tereziny Dary (72)

== Demographics ==
Historical population
Year	Pop.	±%
1869	651	—
1880	705	+8.3%
1890	618	−12.3%
1900	594	−3.9%
1910	613	+3.2%
1921	606	−1.1%
1930	520	−14.2%
1950	384	−26.2%
1961	393	+2.3%
1970	315	−19.8%
1980	260	−17.5%
1991	209	−19.6%
2001	203	−2.9%
2011	199	−2.0%
2021	213	+7.0%
Source: Censuses
