= Slavhostice =

- Municipality
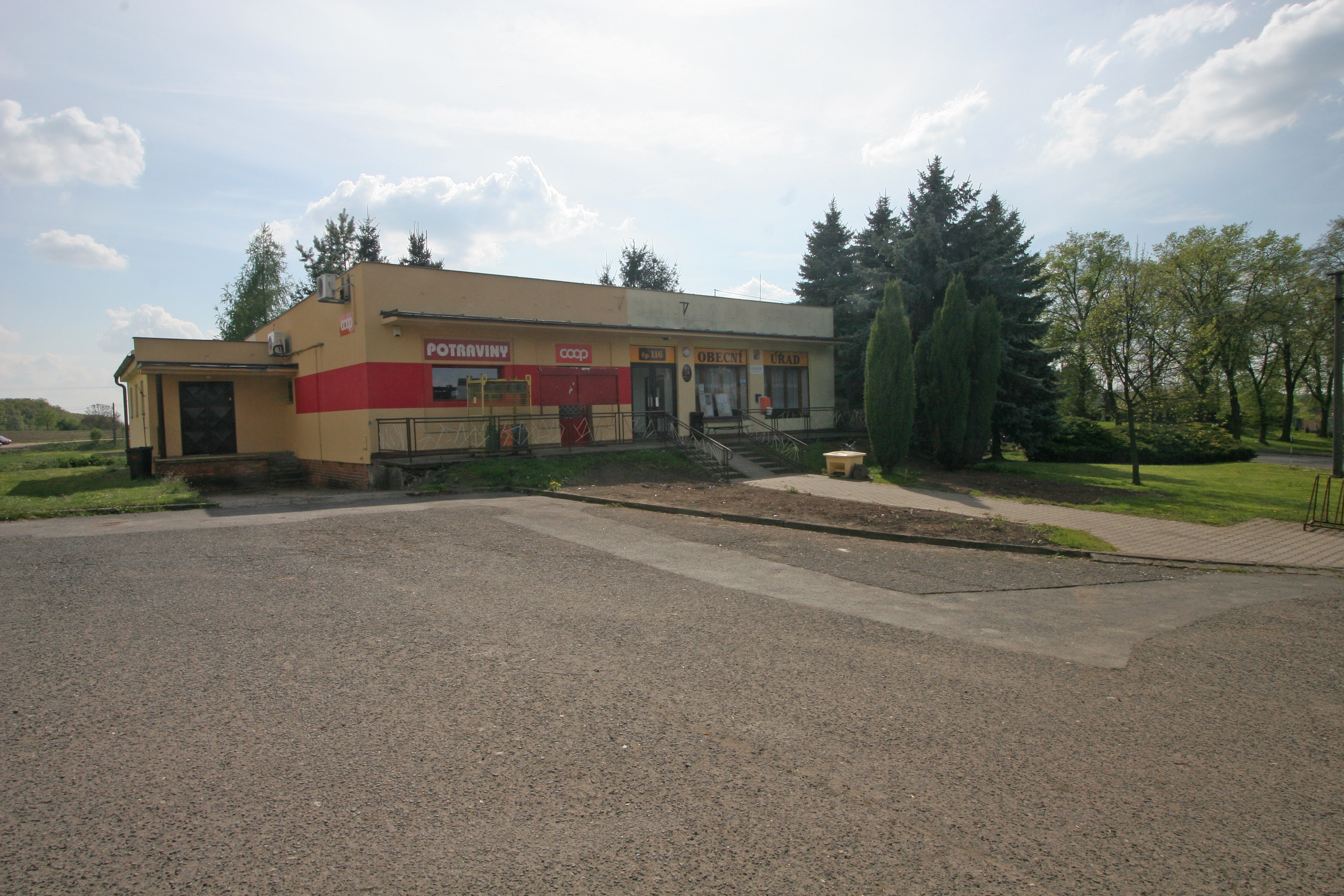
- Municipal office and grocery store

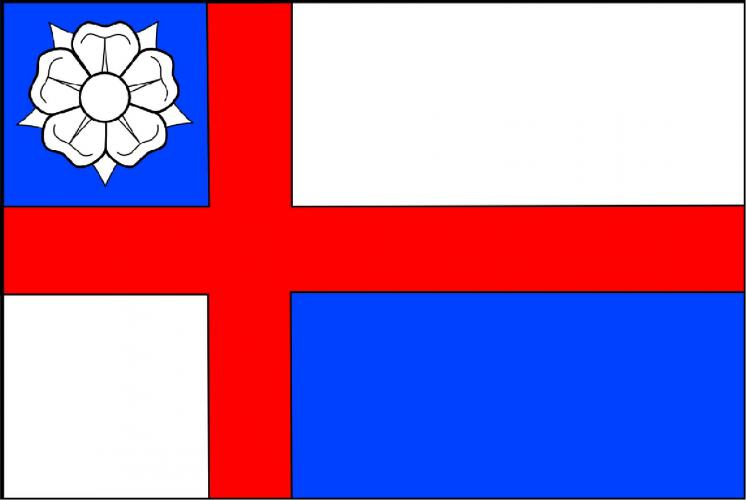
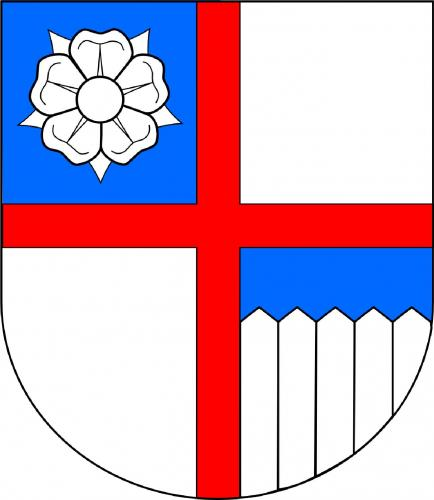
- Flag Coat of arms

- Location in the Czech Republic
- Coordinates: 50°18′32″N 15°20′58″E
- Country: Czech Republic
- Region: Hradec Králové
- District: Jičín
- First mentioned: 1371

Area
  - Total: 5.85 km^{2} (2.26 sq mi)
- Elevation: 258 m (846 ft)

Population (2026-01-01)
  - Total: 129
  - Density: 22.1/km^{2} (57.1/sq mi)
- Time zone: UTC+1 (CET)
  - Summer (DST): UTC+2 (CEST)
- Postal code: 507 32
- Website: www.slavhostice.cz

Slavhostice is a municipality and village in Jičín District in the Hradec Králové Region of the Czech Republic. It has about 100 inhabitants.

== Demographics ==
Historical population
Year	Pop.	±%
1869	455	—
1880	534	+17.4%
1890	539	+0.9%
1900	526	−2.4%
1910	521	−1.0%
1921	490	−6.0%
1930	505	+3.1%
1950	325	−35.6%
1961	312	−4.0%
1970	273	−12.5%
1980	207	−24.2%
1991	158	−23.7%
2001	145	−8.2%
2011	138	−4.8%
2021	127	−8.0%
Source: Censuses
