= Jičín District =

District of the Czech Republic

Jičín District Okres Jičín
- District
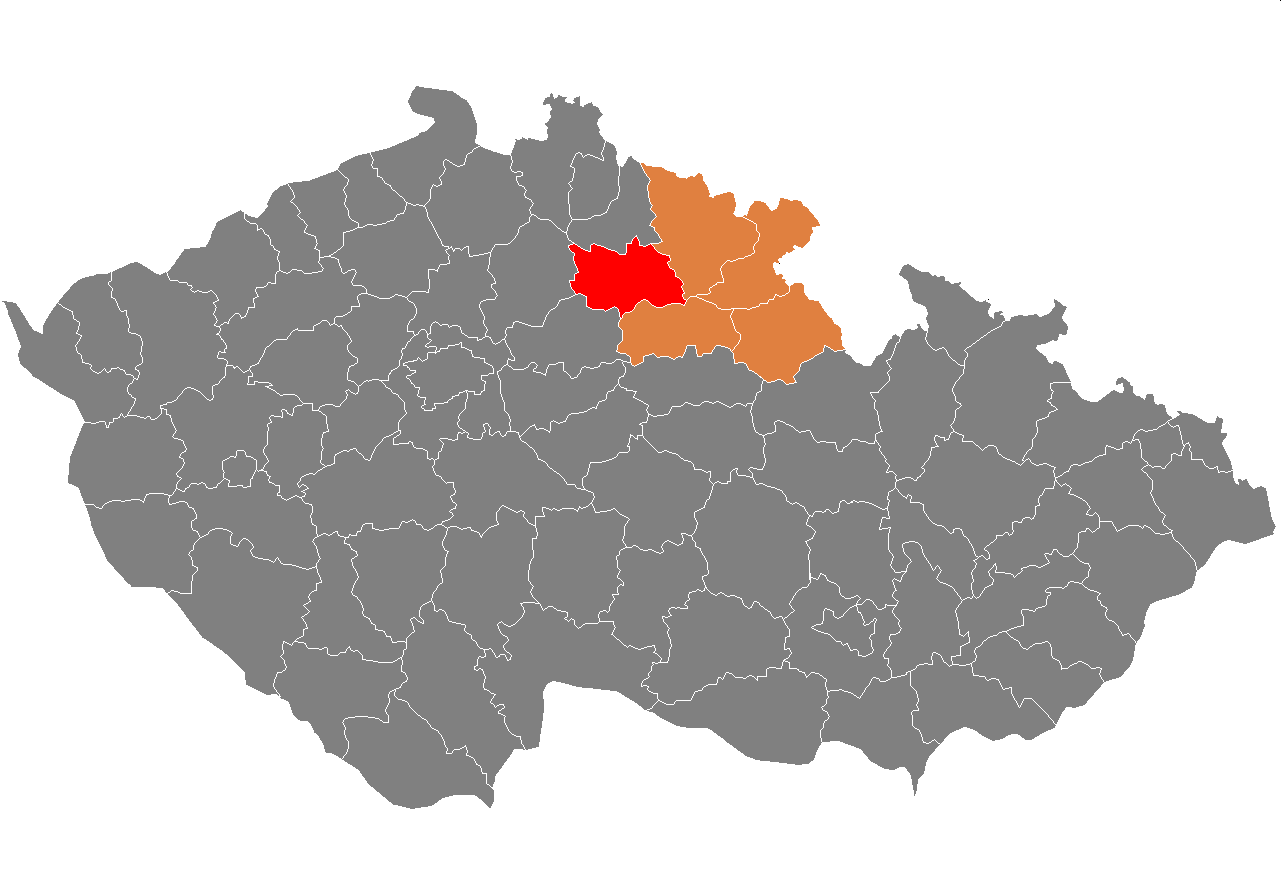
- Location in the Hradec Králové Region within the Czech Republic
- Coordinates: 50°25′N 15°25′E
- Country: Czech Republic
- Region: Hradec Králové
- Capital: Jičín

Area
  - Total: 886.87 km^{2} (342.42 sq mi)

Population (2026)
  - Total: 80,272
  - Density: 90.512/km^{2} (234.42/sq mi)
- Time zone: UTC+1 (CET)
  - Summer (DST): UTC+2 (CEST)
- Municipalities: 111
- * Towns: 10
- * Market towns: 3

Jičín District (Czech: okres Jičín) is a district in the Hradec Králové Region of the Czech Republic. Its capital is the town of Jičín.

== Administrative division ==
Jičín District is divided into three administrative districts of municipalities with extended competence: Jičín, Hořice and Nová Paka.

=== List of municipalities ===
Towns are marked in bold and market towns in italics:

Bačalky – Bašnice – Běchary – Bílsko u Hořic – Boháňka – Borek – Brada-Rybníček – Březina – Bříšťany – Budčeves – Bukvice – Butoves – Bystřice – Cerekvice nad Bystřicí – Červená Třemešná – Češov – Cholenice – Chomutice – Choteč – Chyjice – Dětenice – Dílce – Dobrá Voda u Hořic – Dolní Lochov – Dřevěnice – Holín – Holovousy – Hořice – Jeřice – Jičín – Jičíněves – Jinolice – Kacákova Lhota – Kbelnice – Kněžnice – Konecchlumí – Kopidlno – Kostelec – Kovač – Kozojedy – Kyje – Lázně Bělohrad – Libáň – Libošovice – Libuň – Lískovice – Lukavec u Hořic – Lužany – Markvartice – Miletín – Milovice u Hořic – Mladějov – Mlázovice – Nemyčeves – Nevratice – Nová Paka – Ohařice – Ohaveč – Osek – Ostroměř – Ostružno – Pecka – Petrovičky – Podhorní Újezd a Vojice – Podhradí – Podůlší – Radim – Rašín – Rohoznice – Rokytňany – Samšina – Sběř – Sedliště – Sekeřice – Slatiny – Slavhostice – Sobčice – Soběraz – Sobotka – Stará Paka – Staré Hrady – Staré Místo – Staré Smrkovice – Střevač – Sukorady – Svatojanský Újezd – Šárovcova Lhota – Tetín – Třebnouševes – Třtěnice – Tuř – Úbislavice – Údrnice – Úhlejov – Újezd pod Troskami – Úlibice – Valdice – Veliš – Vidochov – Vitiněves – Volanice – Vrbice – Vršce – Vřesník – Vysoké Veselí – Zámostí-Blata – Zelenecká Lhota – Železnice – Žeretice – Židovice – Žlunice

== Geography ==
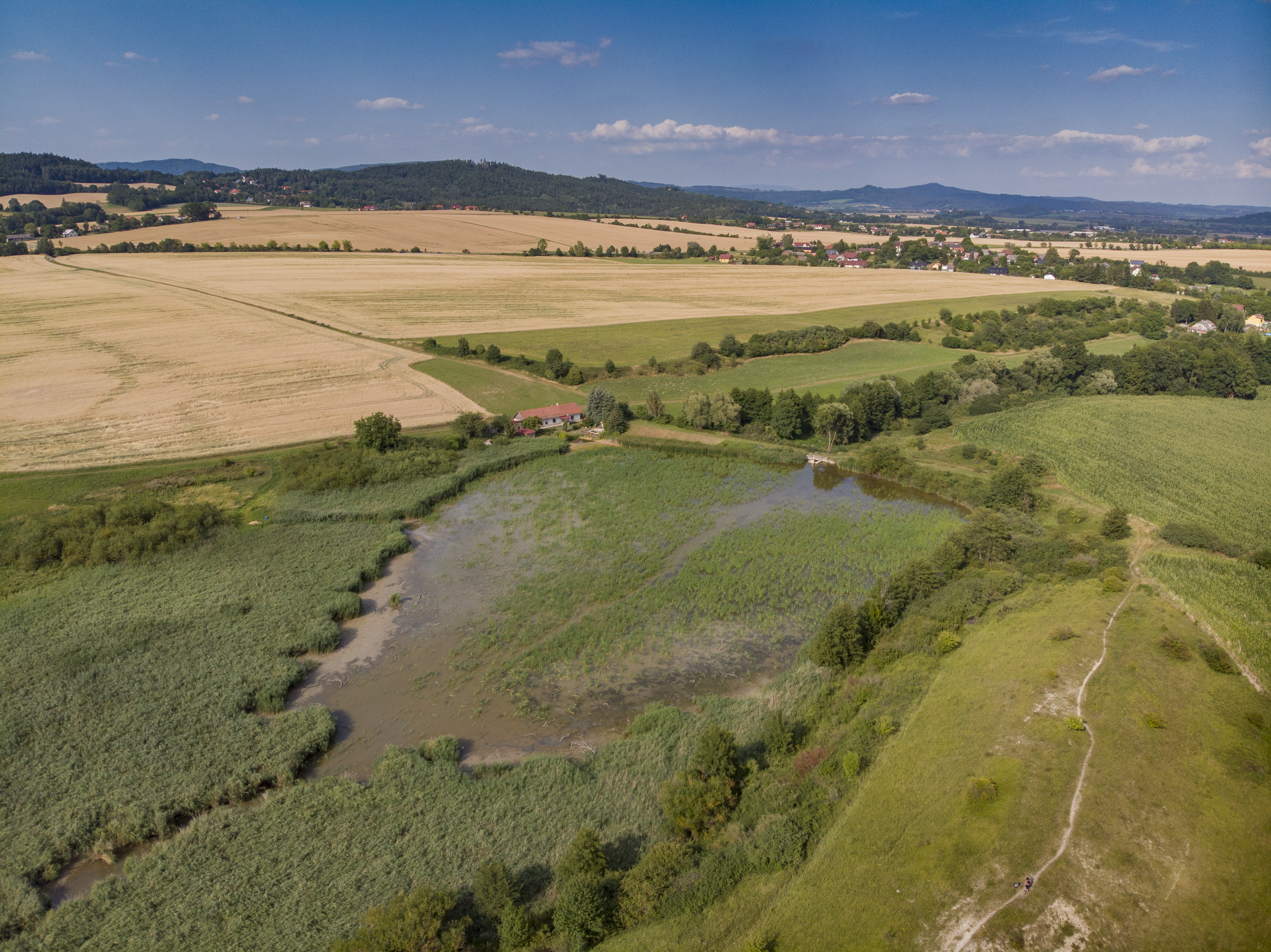
Landscape west of Jičín

The landscape is mainly deforested with flat or slightly undulating terrain, but in the north it turns into a hilly terrain. The territory extends into five geomorphological mesoregions: Jičín Uplands (most of the territory), Giant Mountains Foothills (northeast), East Elbe Table (south), Central Elbe Table (southwest) and Ještěd–Kozákov Ridge (small part in the north). The highest point of the district is the hill Kozinec in Vidochov with an elevation of 608 m (1,995 ft), the lowest point is the river bed of the Mrlina in Kopidlno at 206 m (676 ft).

From the total district area of 886.9 km^{2} (342.4 sq mi), agricultural land occupies 601.4 km^{2} (232.2 sq mi), forests occupy 193.3 km^{2} (74.6 sq mi), and water area occupies 14.1 km^{2} (5.4 sq mi). Forests cover 21.8% of the district's area.

There are no significant rivers and bodies of water. The longest river is the Cidlina, which crosses the territory from north to south. Another notable rivers in the district are the Mrlina and Bystřice. The largest body of water is the pond Zrcadlo with an area of 60 ha (150 acres).

Bohemian Paradise is the protected landscape area that extends into the district, in its northwestern part.

== Demographics ==
Historical population

Year	Pop.	±%
1869	112,576	—
1880	115,975	+3.0%
1890	117,292	+1.1%
1900	116,937	−0.3%
1910	119,885	+2.5%

Year	Pop.	±%
1921	114,970	−4.1%
1930	110,778	−3.6%
1950	88,583	−20.0%
1961	87,434	−1.3%
1970	82,515	−5.6%

Year	Pop.	±%
1980	81,894	−0.8%
1991	78,650	−4.0%
2001	77,761	−1.1%
2011	79,702	+2.5%
2021	78,704	−1.3%

Source: Censuses

=== Most populous municipalities ===
Name	Population	Area (km^{2})
Jičín	16,052	26
Nová Paka	8,834	29
Hořice	8,427	21
Lázně Bělohrad	3,701	28
Sobotka	2,401	19
Stará Paka	2,142	22
Kopidlno	2,135	29
Libáň	1,918	20
Železnice	1,435	13
Ostroměř	1,339	12

== Economy ==
The largest employers with headquarters in Jičín District and at least 500 employees are:

Economic entity	Location	Number of employees	Main activity
Continental Automotive Czech Republic	Jičín	4,000–4,999	Automotive industry
C.S.CARGO	Jičín	1,000–1,499	Freight transport by road
Regional Hospital Jičín	Jičín	1,000–1,499	Health care
Ronal CR	Jičín	1,000–1,499	Automotive industry

In Mladějov is the largest deposit of high-quality glass sand in the Czech Republic.

== Transport ==
There are no motorways passing through the district. The most important road is the I/35 (part of the European route E442) from Liberec to Hradec Králové.

== Sights ==
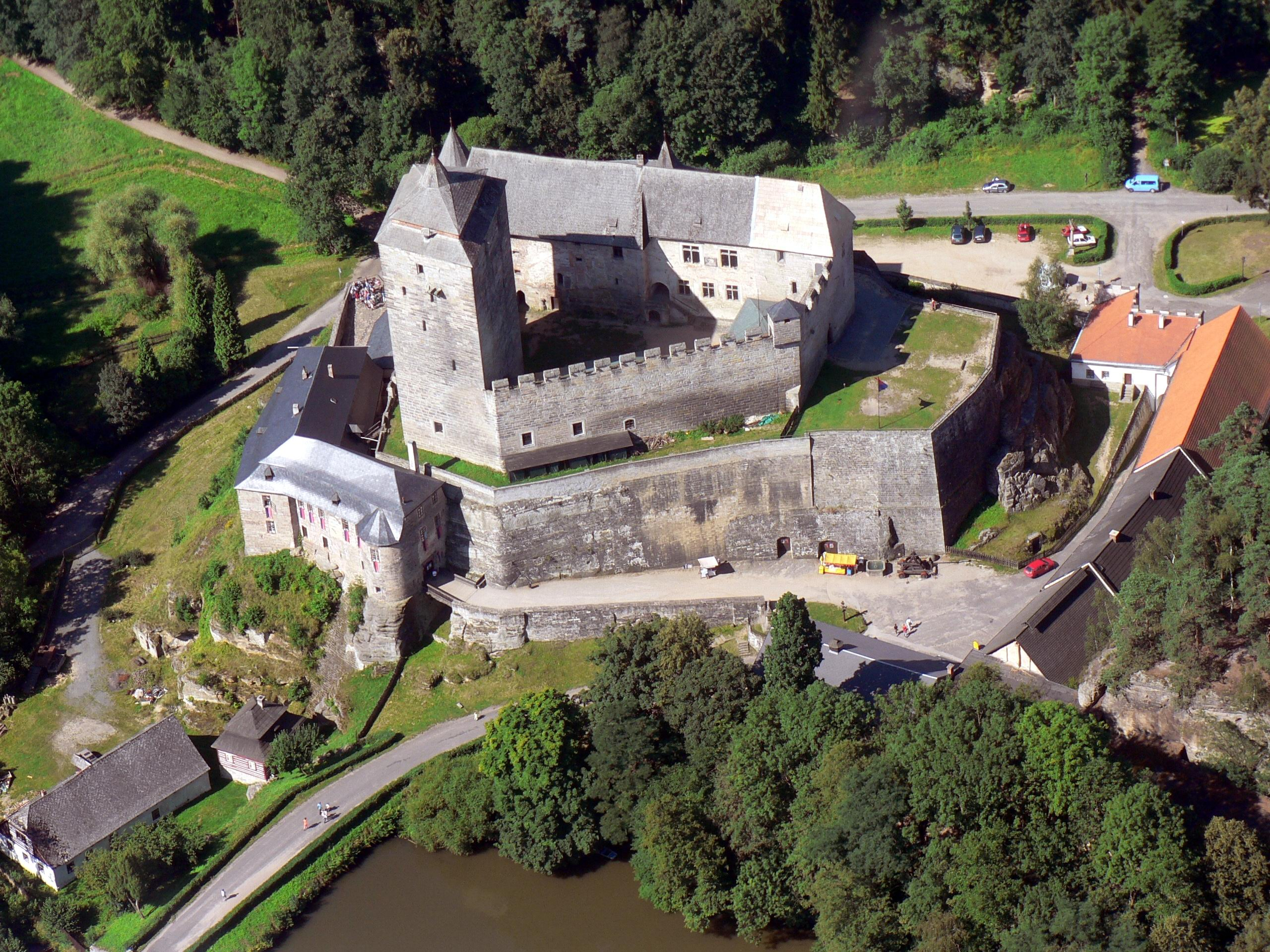
Kost Castle

The most important monuments in the district, protected as national cultural monuments, are:

- Humprecht Castle
- Kost Castle

The best-preserved settlements, protected as monument reservations and monument zones, are:

- Jičín (monument reservation)
- Vesec (monument reservation)
- Pecka
- Sobotka
- Železnice
- Karlov
- Nové Smrkovice
- Štidla
- Studeňany

The most visited tourist destinations are the Dětenice Castle and the Prachov Rocks.
