= Ohaveč =

- Municipality
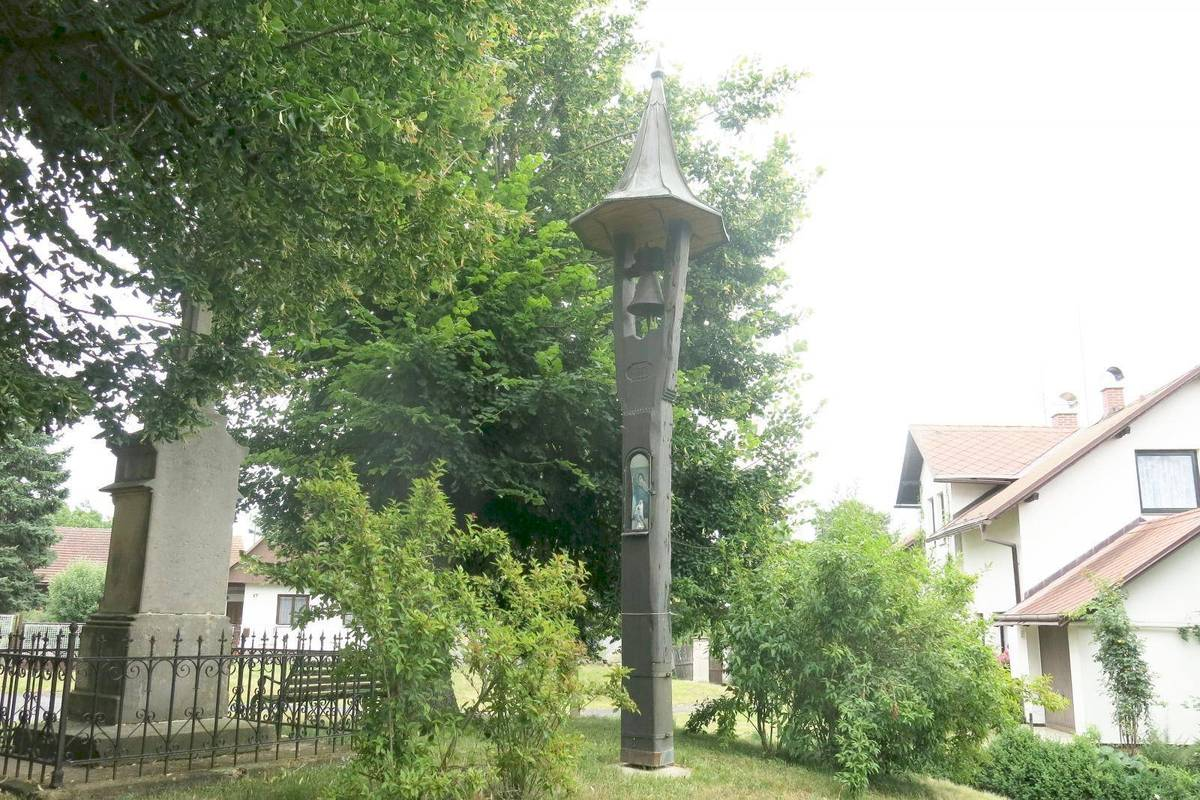
- Wooden belfry in the centre of Ohaveč

- Location in the Czech Republic
- Coordinates: 50°26′59″N 15°18′32″E
- Country: Czech Republic
- Region: Hradec Králové
- District: Jičín
- First mentioned: 1327

Area
  - Total: 1.39 km^{2} (0.54 sq mi)
- Elevation: 293 m (961 ft)

Population (2026-01-01)
  - Total: 149
  - Density: 107/km^{2} (278/sq mi)
- Time zone: UTC+1 (CET)
  - Summer (DST): UTC+2 (CEST)
- Postal code: 506 01
- Website: obec-ohavec.cz

Ohaveč is a municipality and village in Jičín District in the Hradec Králové Region of the Czech Republic. It has about 100 inhabitants.

== History ==
The first written mention of Ohaveč is from 1327.

== Demographics ==
Historical population
Year	Pop.	±%
1869	149	—
1880	134	−10.1%
1890	146	+9.0%
1900	148	+1.4%
1910	125	−15.5%
1921	119	−4.8%
1930	119	+0.0%
1950	93	−21.8%
1961	92	−1.1%
1970	93	+1.1%
1980	72	−22.6%
1991	62	−13.9%
2001	61	−1.6%
2011	76	+24.6%
2021	118	+55.3%
Source: Censuses
