= Bačalky =

- Municipality
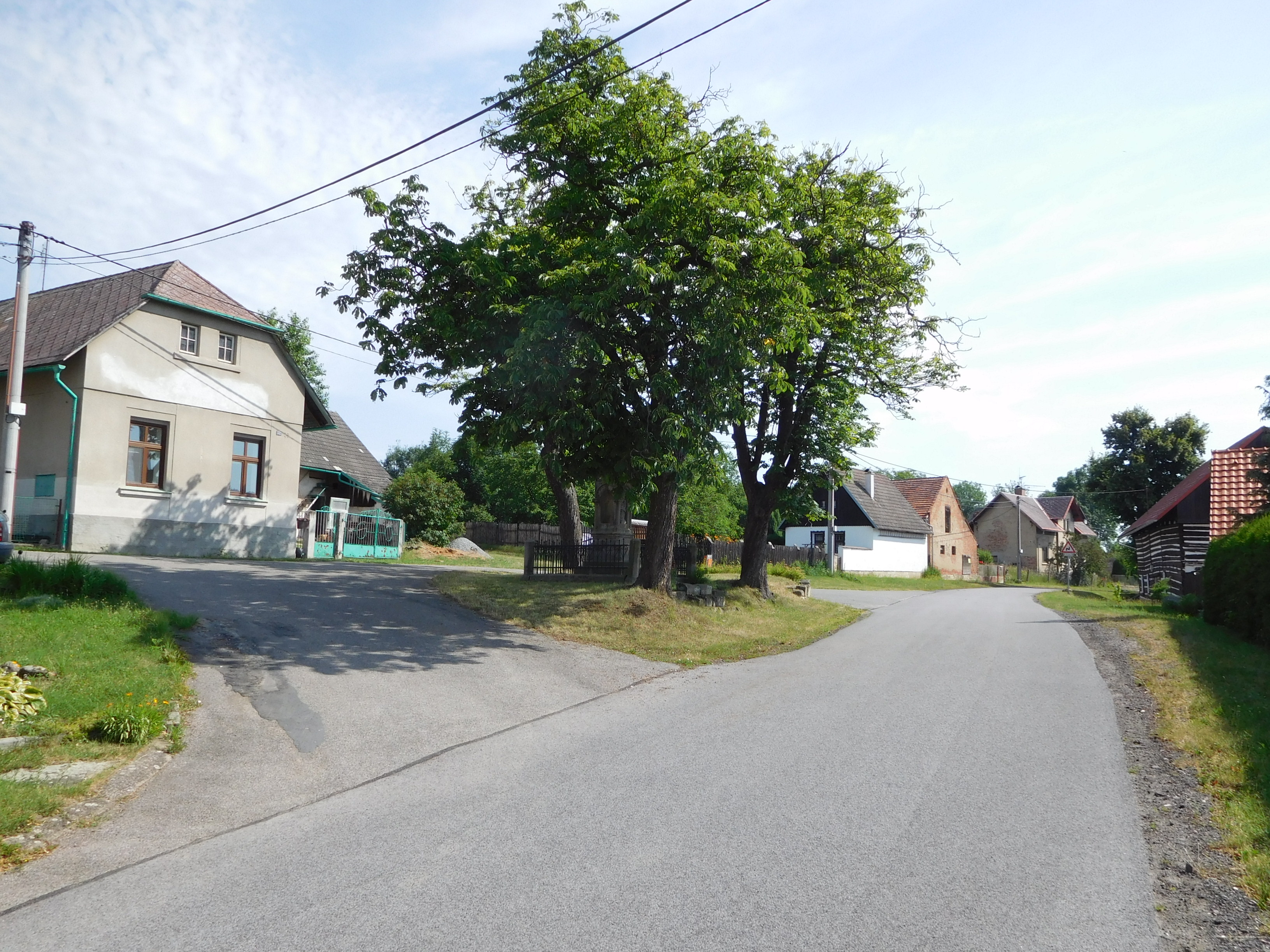
- Lično, a part of Bačalky

- Location in the Czech Republic
- Coordinates: 50°23′6″N 15°9′13″E
- Country: Czech Republic
- Region: Hradec Králové
- District: Jičín
- First mentioned: 1371

Area
  - Total: 5.70 km^{2} (2.20 sq mi)
- Elevation: 374 m (1,227 ft)

Population (2026-01-01)
  - Total: 170
  - Density: 30/km^{2} (77/sq mi)
- Time zone: UTC+1 (CET)
  - Summer (DST): UTC+2 (CEST)
- Postal code: 507 23
- Website: www.bacalky.cz

Bačalky is a municipality and village in Jičín District in the Hradec Králové Region of the Czech Republic. It has about 200 inhabitants.

== Administrative division ==
Bačalky consists of two municipal parts (in brackets population according to the 2021 census):

- Bačalky (126)
- Lično (35)

== Demographics ==
Historical population
Year	Pop.	±%
1869	706	—
1880	730	+3.4%
1890	669	−8.4%
1900	643	−3.9%
1910	610	−5.1%
1921	646	+5.9%
1930	597	−7.6%
1950	383	−35.8%
1961	362	−5.5%
1970	290	−19.9%
1980	215	−25.9%
1991	173	−19.5%
2001	162	−6.4%
2011	157	−3.1%
2021	161	+2.5%
Source: Censuses
