= Vidochov =

- Municipality
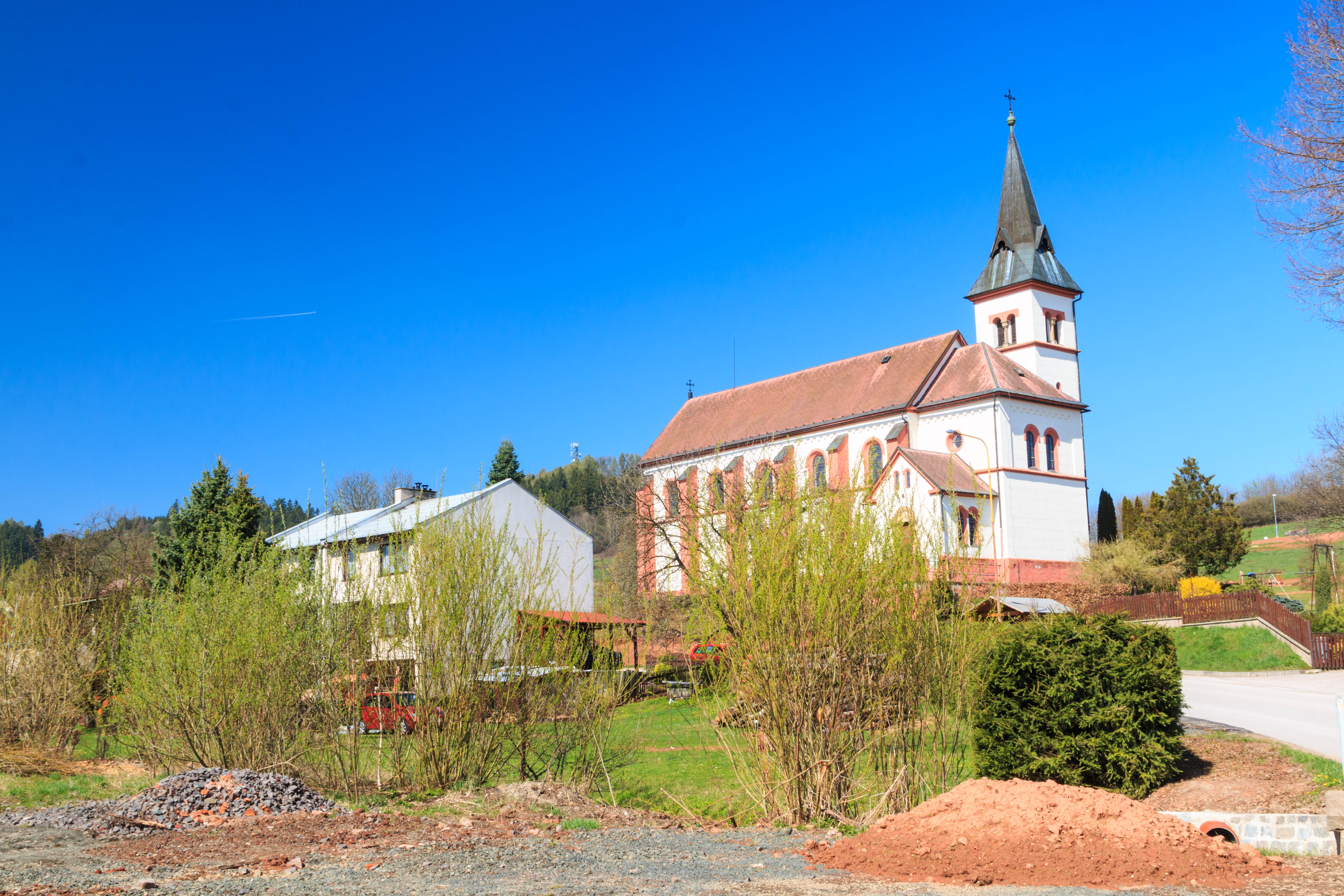
- Church of the Holy Guardian Angels

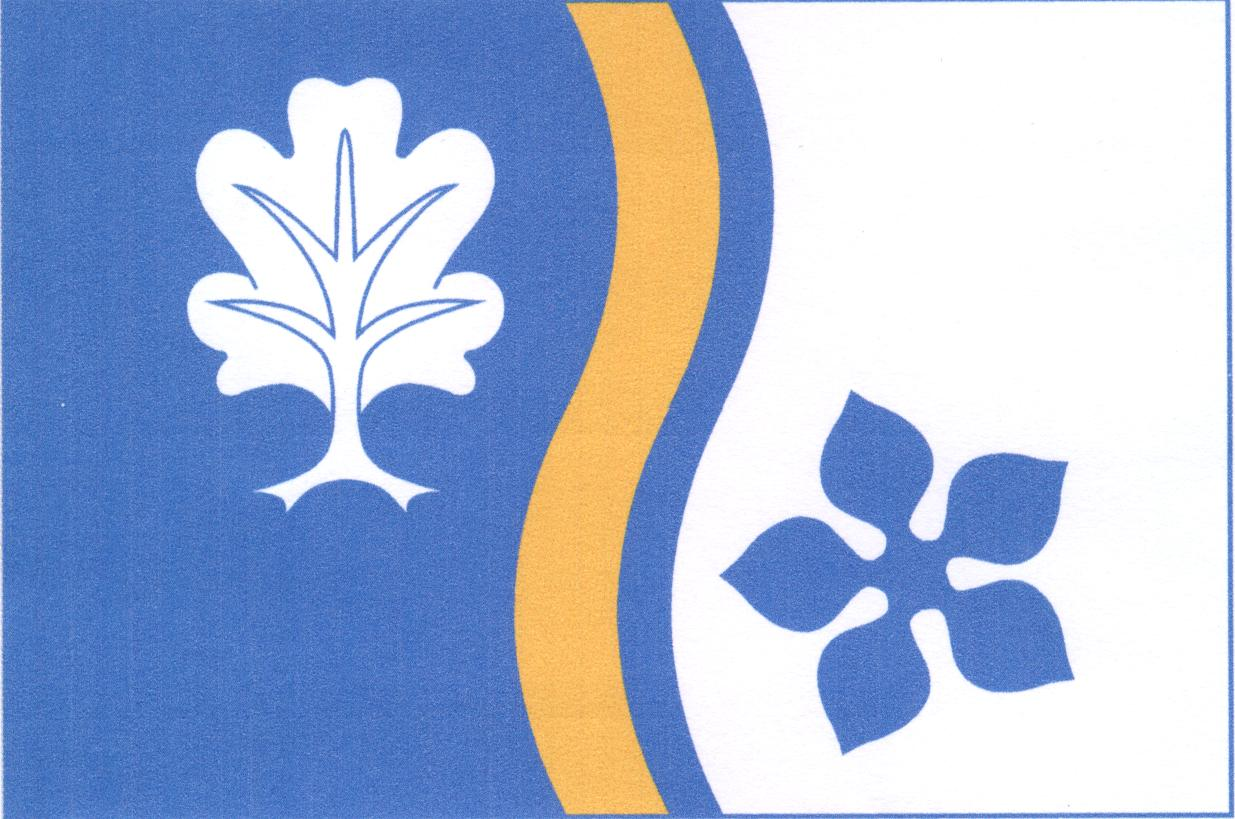
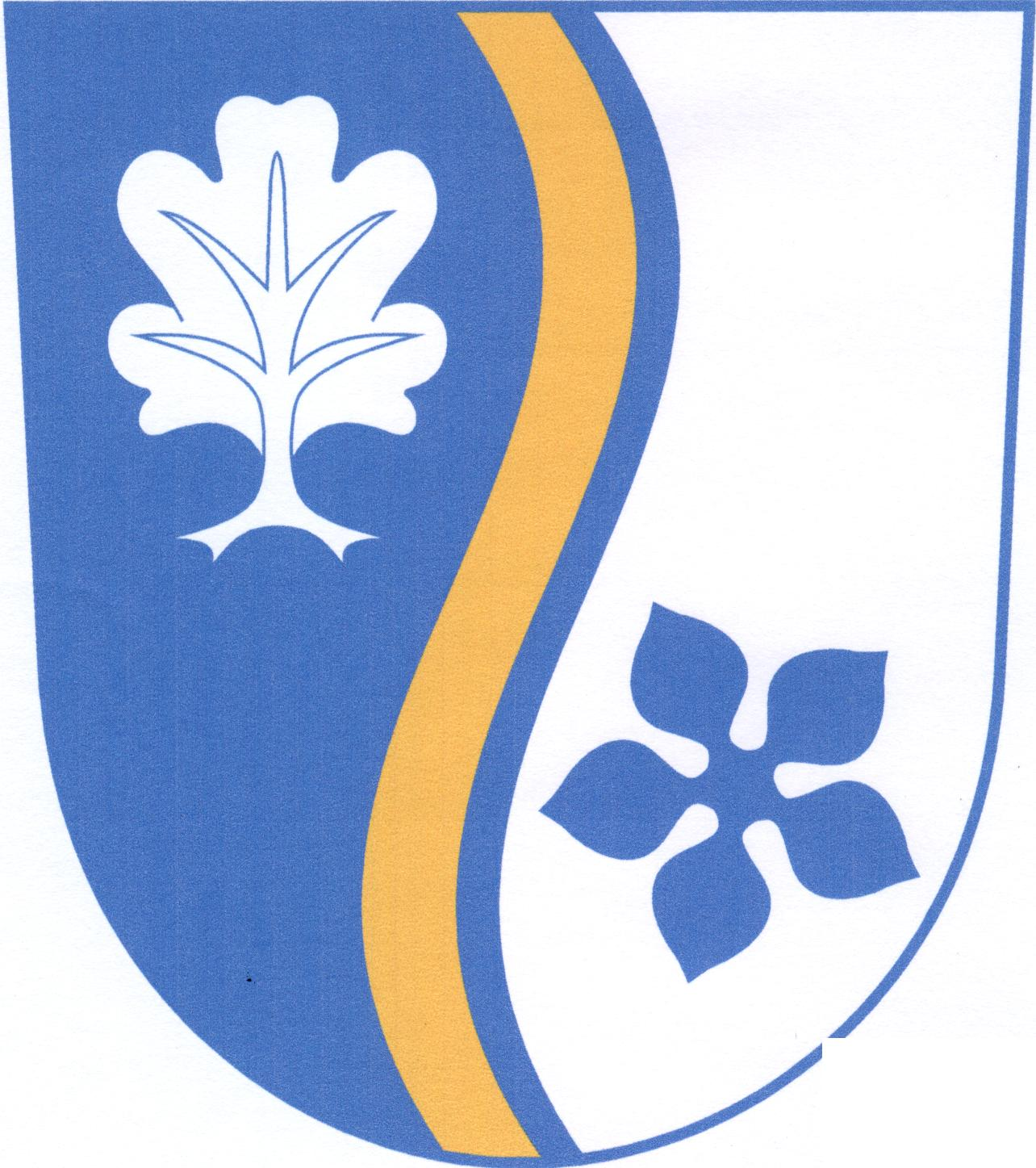
- Flag Coat of arms

- Location in the Czech Republic
- Coordinates: 50°30′45″N 15°33′57″E
- Country: Czech Republic
- Region: Hradec Králové
- District: Jičín
- First mentioned: 1386

Area
  - Total: 11.71 km^{2} (4.52 sq mi)
- Elevation: 476 m (1,562 ft)

Population (2026-01-01)
  - Total: 354
  - Density: 30.2/km^{2} (78.3/sq mi)
- Time zone: UTC+1 (CET)
  - Summer (DST): UTC+2 (CEST)
- Postal codes: 507 82, 509 01
- Website: www.obecvidochov.cz

Vidochov is a municipality and village in Jičín District in the Hradec Králové Region of the Czech Republic. It has about 400 inhabitants.

== Administrative division ==
Vidochov consists of two municipal parts (in brackets population according to the 2021 census):

- Vidochov (286)
- Stupná (54)

== Demographics ==
Historical population
Year	Pop.	±%
1869	1,449	—
1880	1,396	−3.7%
1890	1,396	+0.0%
1900	1,279	−8.4%
1910	1,261	−1.4%
1921	1,032	−18.2%
1930	1,032	+0.0%
1950	575	−44.3%
1961	546	−5.0%
1970	470	−13.9%
1980	394	−16.2%
1991	347	−11.9%
2001	342	−1.4%
2011	357	+4.4%
2021	340	−4.8%
Source: Censuses
