= Dílce =

- Municipality
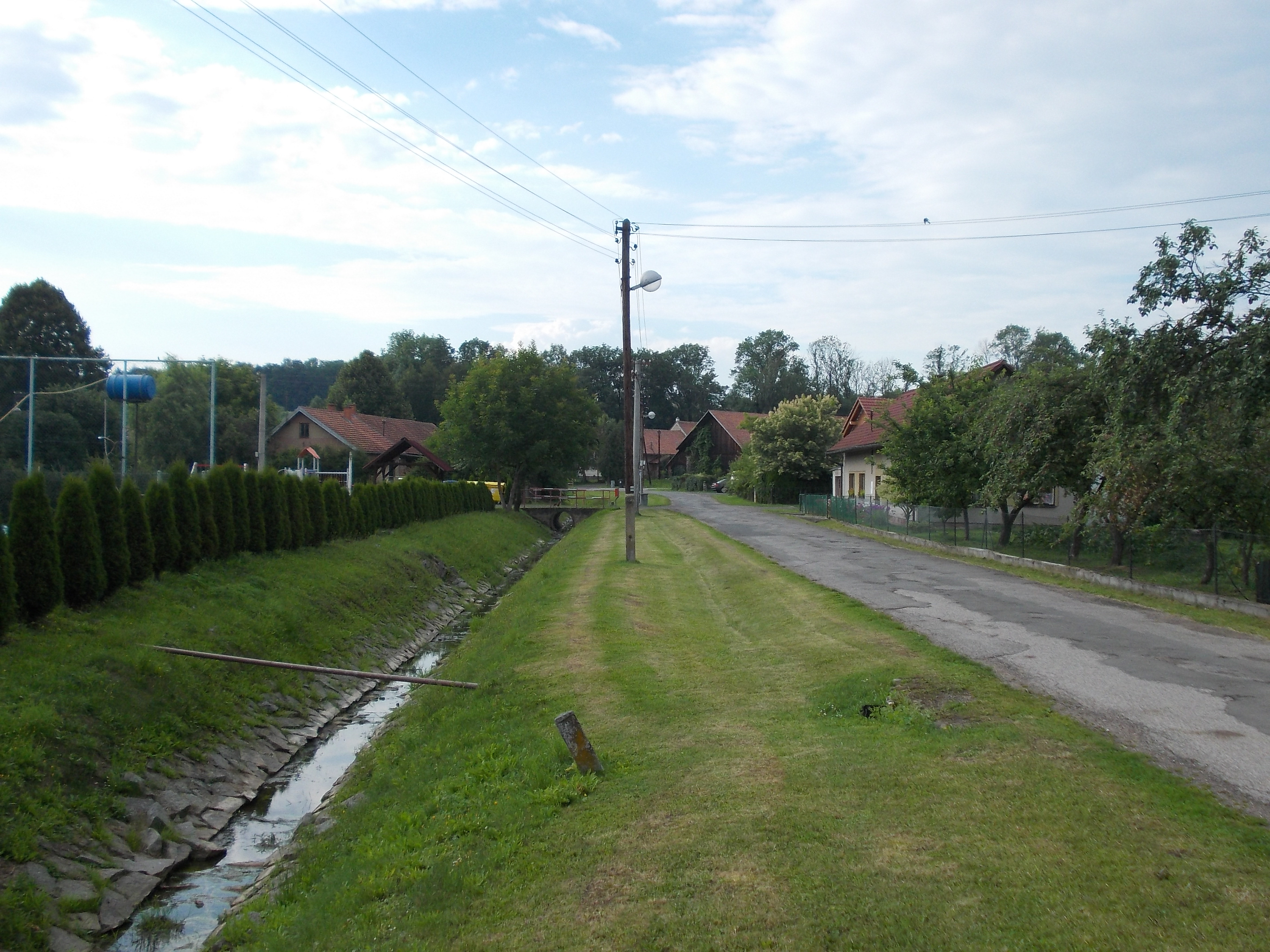
- Centre of Dílce

- Location in the Czech Republic
- Coordinates: 50°28′2″N 15°21′34″E
- Country: Czech Republic
- Region: Hradec Králové
- District: Jičín
- First mentioned: 1542

Area
  - Total: 1.87 km^{2} (0.72 sq mi)
- Elevation: 287 m (942 ft)

Population (2026-01-01)
  - Total: 59
  - Density: 32/km^{2} (82/sq mi)
- Time zone: UTC+1 (CET)
  - Summer (DST): UTC+2 (CEST)
- Postal code: 506 01
- Website: dilce.e-obec.info

Dílce is a municipality and village in Jičín District in the Hradec Králové Region of the Czech Republic. It has about 60 inhabitants.

== Demographics ==
Historical population
Year	Pop.	±%
1869	196	—
1880	166	−15.3%
1890	180	+8.4%
1900	164	−8.9%
1910	166	+1.2%
1921	147	−11.4%
1930	124	−15.6%
1950	111	−10.5%
1961	97	−12.6%
1970	75	−22.7%
1980	55	−26.7%
1991	51	−7.3%
2001	42	−17.6%
2011	49	+16.7%
2021	67	+36.7%
Source: Censuses
