= Bukvice =

- Municipality
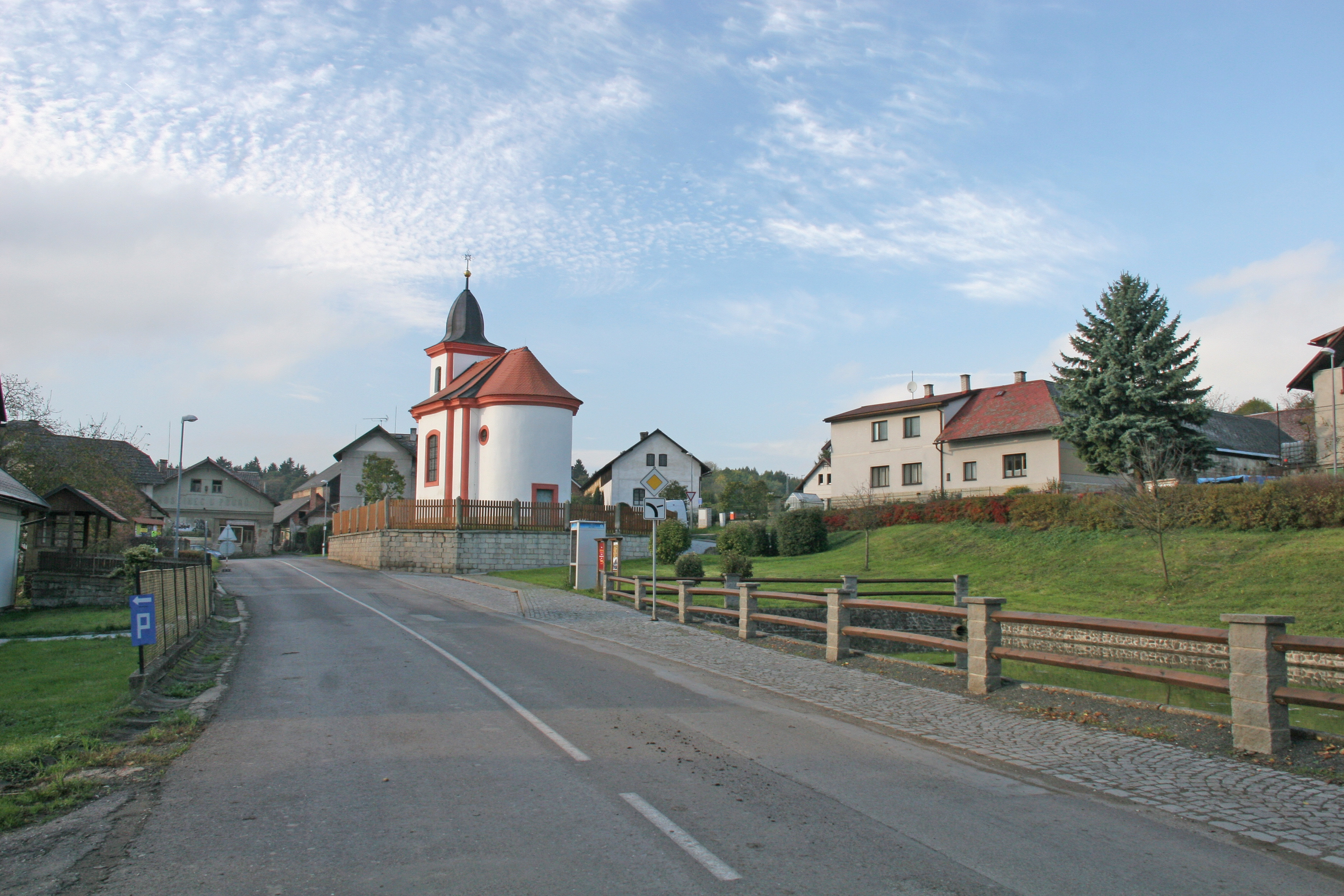
- Chapel of Saint John of Nepomuk

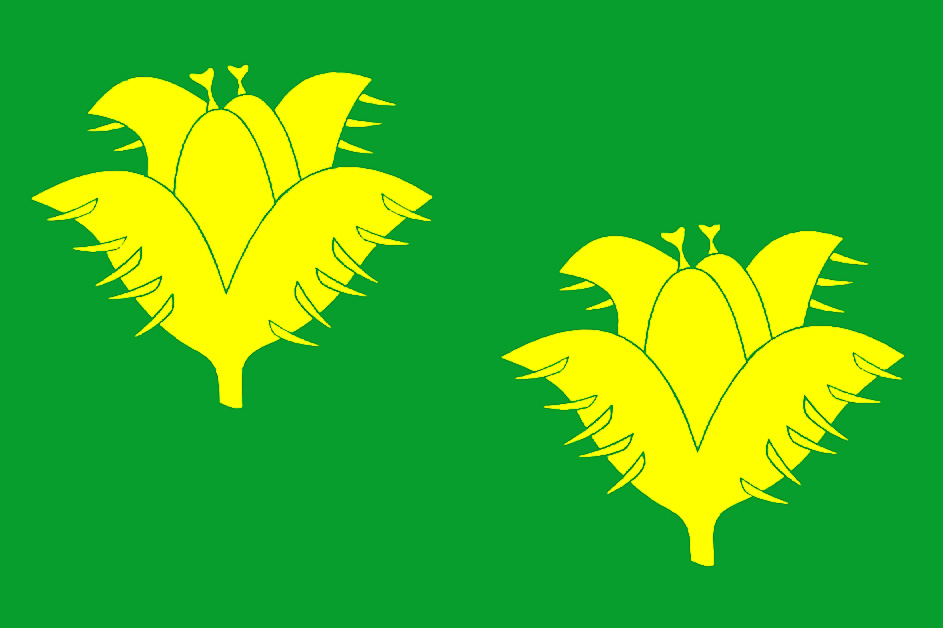
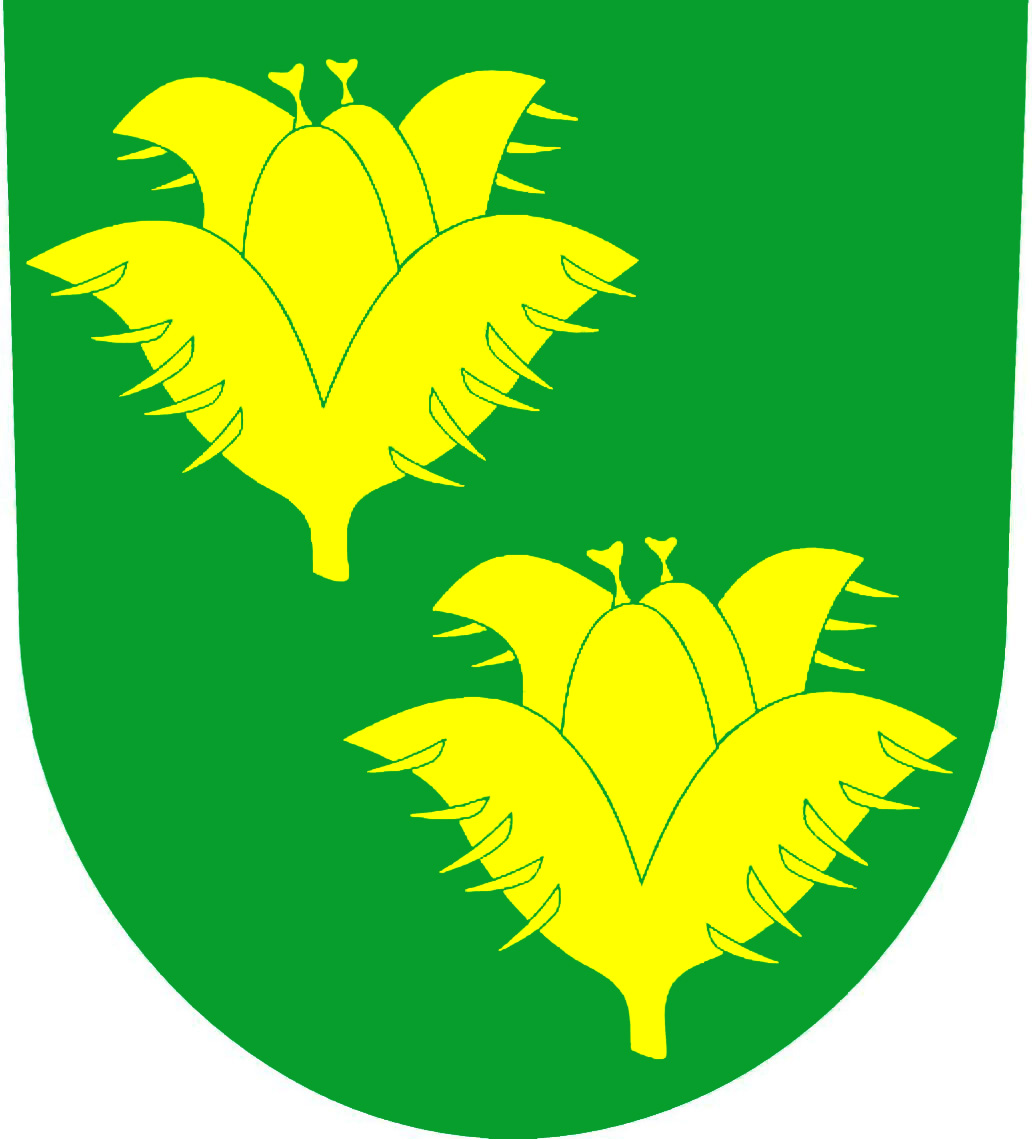
- Flag Coat of arms

- Location in the Czech Republic
- Coordinates: 50°24′45″N 15°17′41″E
- Country: Czech Republic
- Region: Hradec Králové
- District: Jičín
- First mentioned: 1327

Area
  - Total: 5.03 km^{2} (1.94 sq mi)
- Elevation: 318 m (1,043 ft)

Population (2026-01-01)
  - Total: 180
  - Density: 36/km^{2} (93/sq mi)
- Time zone: UTC+1 (CET)
  - Summer (DST): UTC+2 (CEST)
- Postal code: 506 01
- Website: www.obecbukvice.cz

Bukvice is a municipality and village in Jičín District in the Hradec Králové Region of the Czech Republic. It has about 200 inhabitants.

== Administrative division ==
Bukvice consists of two municipal parts (in brackets population according to the 2021 census):

- Bukvice (115)
- Křelina (34)

== Demographics ==
Historical population
Year	Pop.	±%
1869	381	—
1880	397	+4.2%
1890	403	+1.5%
1900	386	−4.2%
1910	399	+3.4%
1921	350	−12.3%
1930	299	−14.6%
1950	229	−23.4%
1961	215	−6.1%
1970	191	−11.2%
1980	169	−11.5%
1991	136	−19.5%
2001	148	+8.8%
2011	134	−9.5%
2021	149	+11.2%
Source: Censuses
