= Vršce =

- Municipality
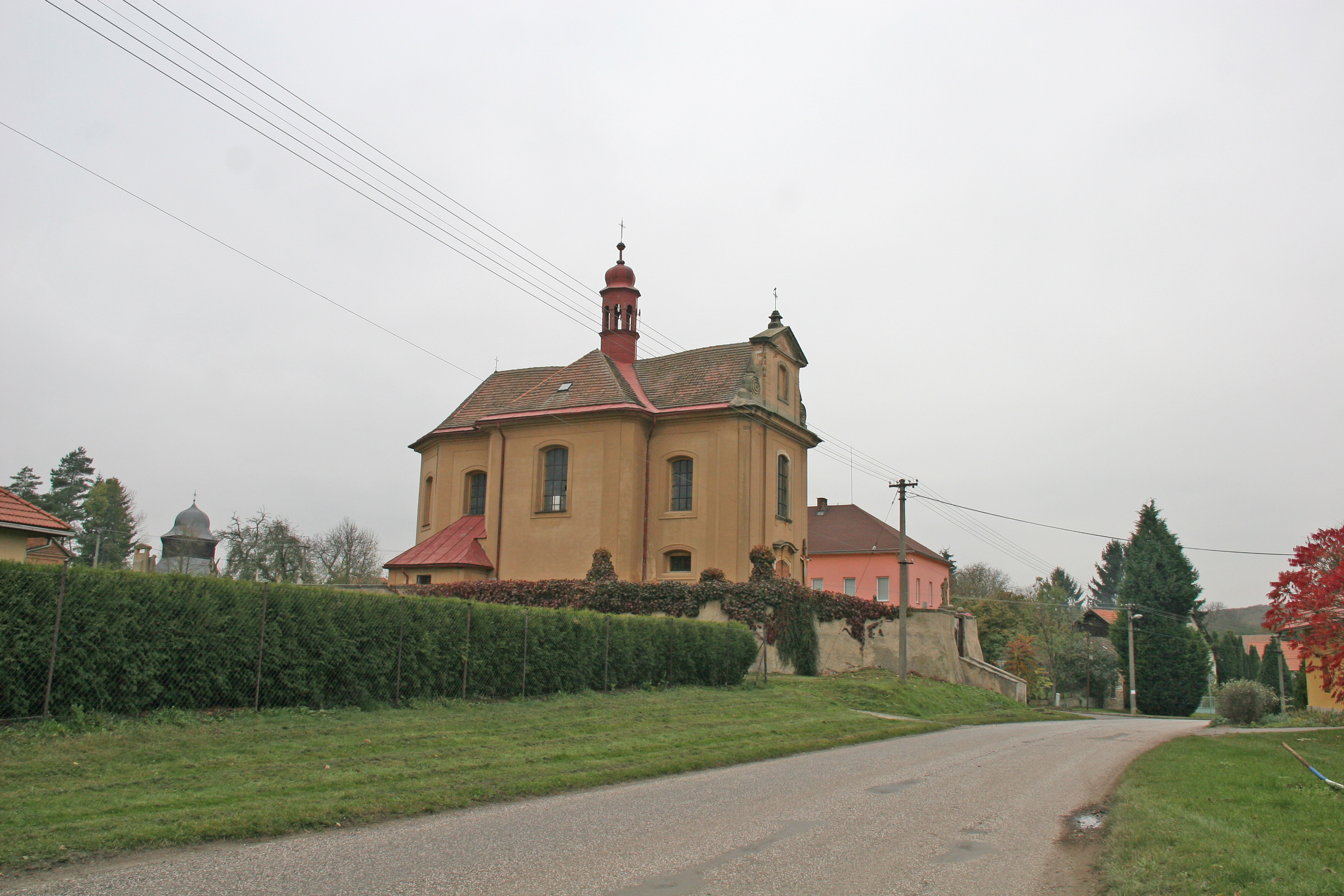
- Church of Saint Lawrence

- Location in the Czech Republic
- Coordinates: 50°19′26″N 15°19′23″E
- Country: Czech Republic
- Region: Hradec Králové
- District: Jičín
- First mentioned: 1247

Area
  - Total: 6.41 km^{2} (2.47 sq mi)
- Elevation: 261 m (856 ft)

Population (2026-01-01)
  - Total: 237
  - Density: 37.0/km^{2} (95.8/sq mi)
- Time zone: UTC+1 (CET)
  - Summer (DST): UTC+2 (CEST)
- Postal code: 507 33
- Website: www.vrsce.cz

Vršce is a municipality and village in Jičín District in the Hradec Králové Region of the Czech Republic. It has about 200 inhabitants.

== History ==
The first written mention of Vršce is from 1247.

== Demographics ==
Historical population
Year	Pop.	±%
1869	397	—
1880	389	−2.0%
1890	438	+12.6%
1900	389	−11.2%
1910	405	+4.1%
1921	415	+2.5%
1930	427	+2.9%
1950	266	−37.7%
1961	252	−5.3%
1970	219	−13.1%
1980	260	+18.7%
1991	234	−10.0%
2001	226	−3.4%
2011	221	−2.2%
2021	218	−1.4%
Source: Censuses
