= Boháňka =

- Municipality
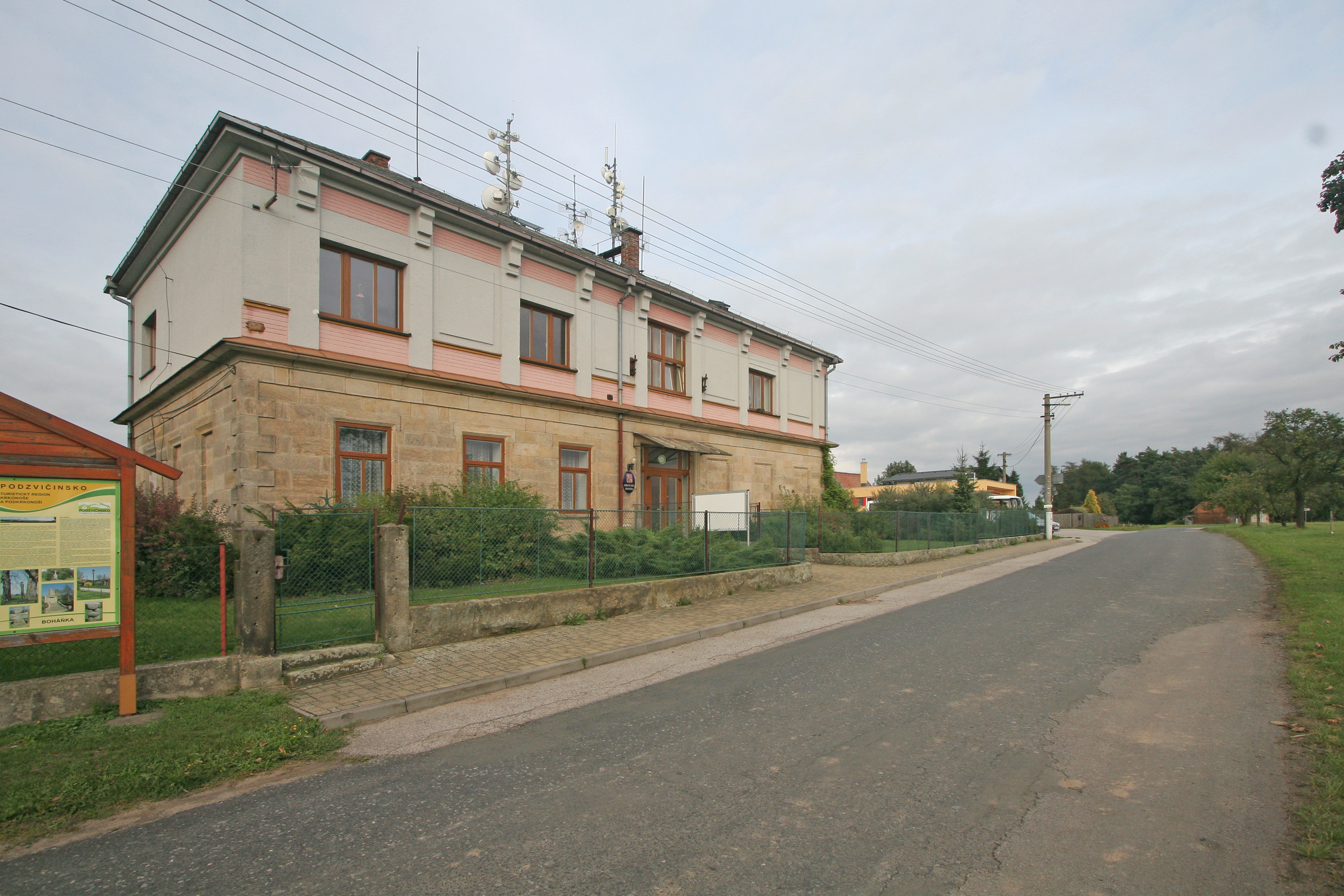
- Municipal office

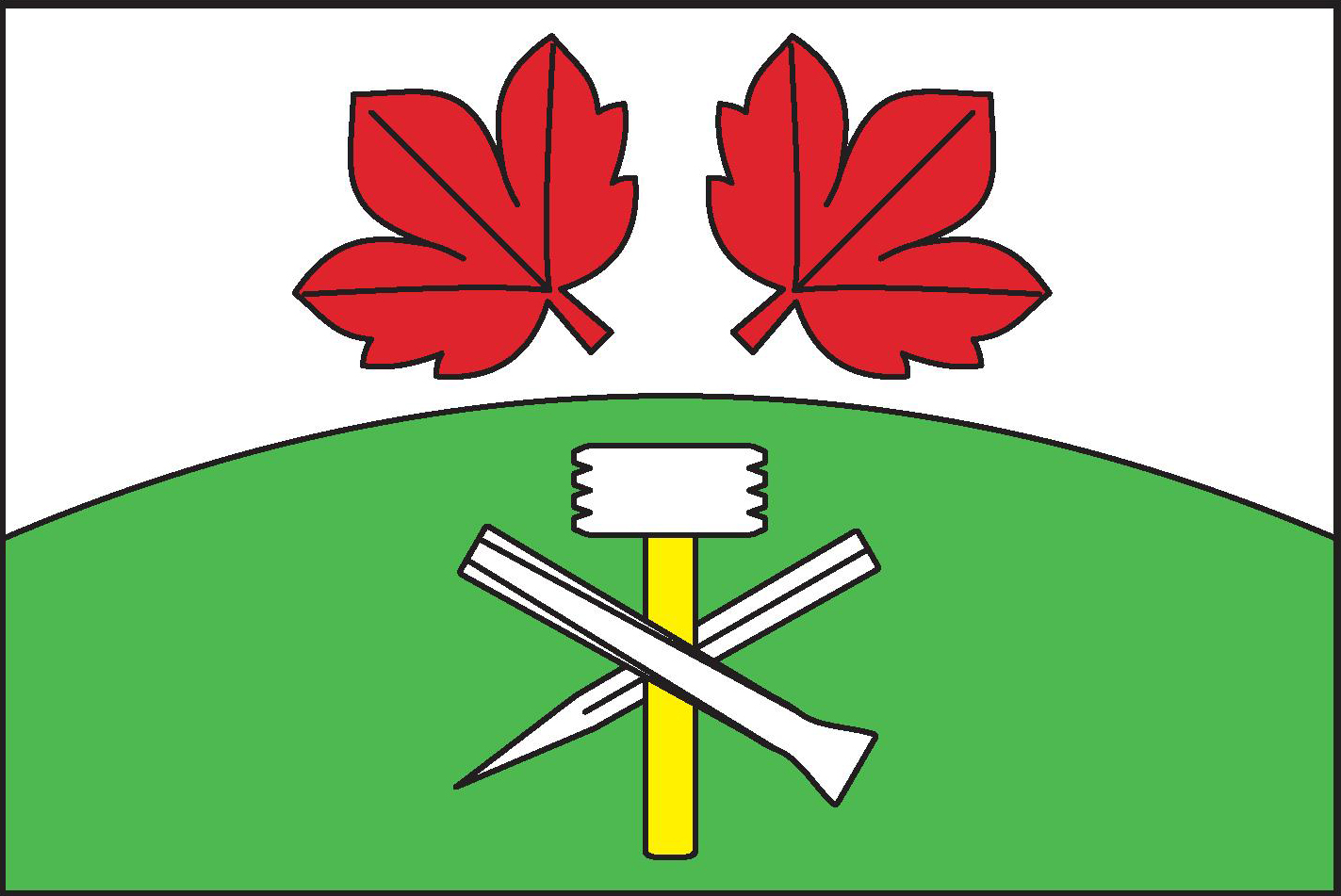
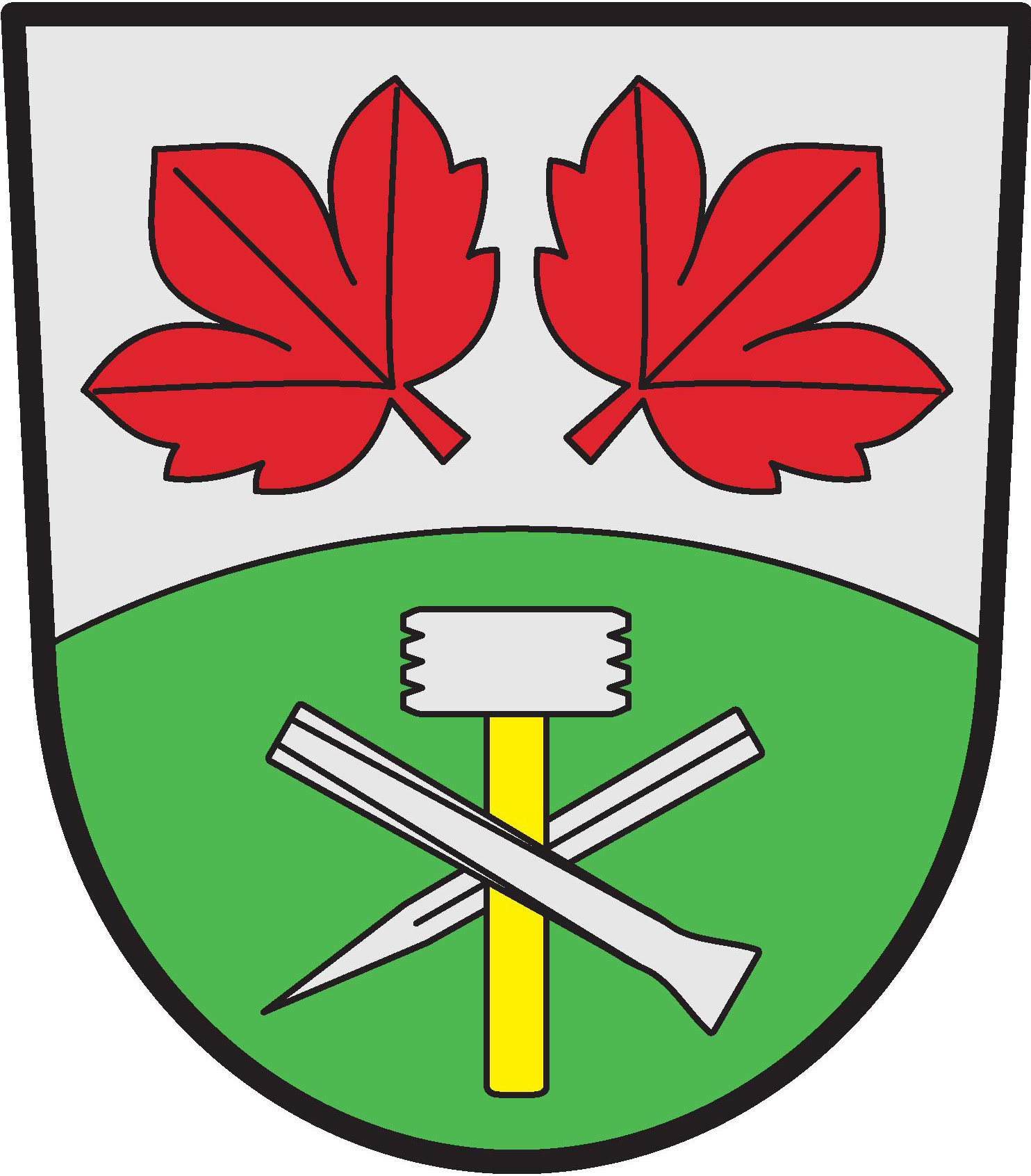
- Flag Coat of arms

- Location in the Czech Republic
- Coordinates: 50°21′57″N 15°42′30″E
- Country: Czech Republic
- Region: Hradec Králové
- District: Jičín
- First mentioned: 1378

Area
  - Total: 9.53 km^{2} (3.68 sq mi)
- Elevation: 411 m (1,348 ft)

Population (2026-01-01)
  - Total: 265
  - Density: 27.8/km^{2} (72.0/sq mi)
- Time zone: UTC+1 (CET)
  - Summer (DST): UTC+2 (CEST)
- Postal code: 508 01
- Website: www.bohanka.cz

Boháňka is a municipality and village in Jičín District in the Hradec Králové Region of the Czech Republic. It has about 300 inhabitants.

== Administrative division ==
Boháňka consists of four municipal parts (in brackets population according to the 2021 census):

- Boháňka (56)
- Chloumek (51)
- Skála (99)
- Votuz (43)

== Demographics ==
Historical population
Year	Pop.	±%
1869	666	—
1880	732	+9.9%
1890	730	−0.3%
1900	662	−9.3%
1910	606	−8.5%
1921	579	−4.5%
1930	560	−3.3%
1950	386	−31.1%
1961	330	−14.5%
1970	281	−14.8%
1980	259	−7.8%
1991	221	−14.7%
2001	211	−4.5%
2011	206	−2.4%
2021	249	+20.9%
Source: Censuses
