= Soběraz =

- Municipality
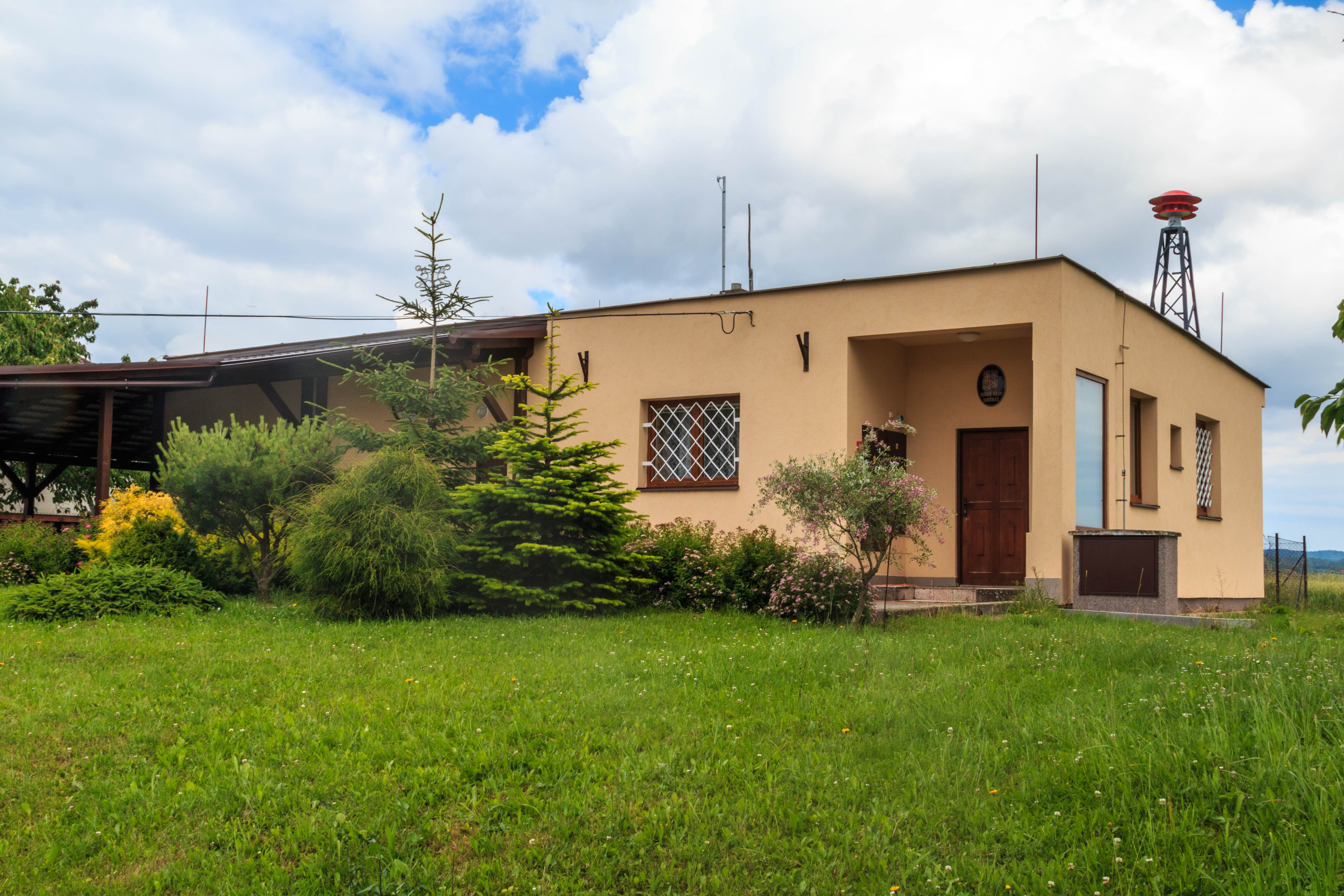
- Municipal office

- Location in the Czech Republic
- Coordinates: 50°27′48″N 15°24′7″E
- Country: Czech Republic
- Region: Hradec Králové
- District: Jičín
- First mentioned: 1362

Area
  - Total: 3.11 km^{2} (1.20 sq mi)
- Elevation: 331 m (1,086 ft)

Population (2026-01-01)
  - Total: 94
  - Density: 30/km^{2} (78/sq mi)
- Time zone: UTC+1 (CET)
  - Summer (DST): UTC+2 (CEST)
- Postal code: 507 13
- Website: soberaz.cz

Soběraz is a municipality and village in Jičín District in the Hradec Králové Region of the Czech Republic. It has about 90 inhabitants.

== Demographics ==
Historical population
Year	Pop.	±%
1869	359	—
1880	343	−4.5%
1890	336	−2.0%
1900	307	−8.6%
1910	286	−6.8%
1921	269	−5.9%
1930	232	−13.8%
1950	166	−28.4%
1961	146	−12.0%
1970	104	−28.8%
1980	75	−27.9%
1991	69	−8.0%
2001	79	+14.5%
2011	91	+15.2%
2021	93	+2.2%
Source: Censuses
