= Libřice =

- Municipality
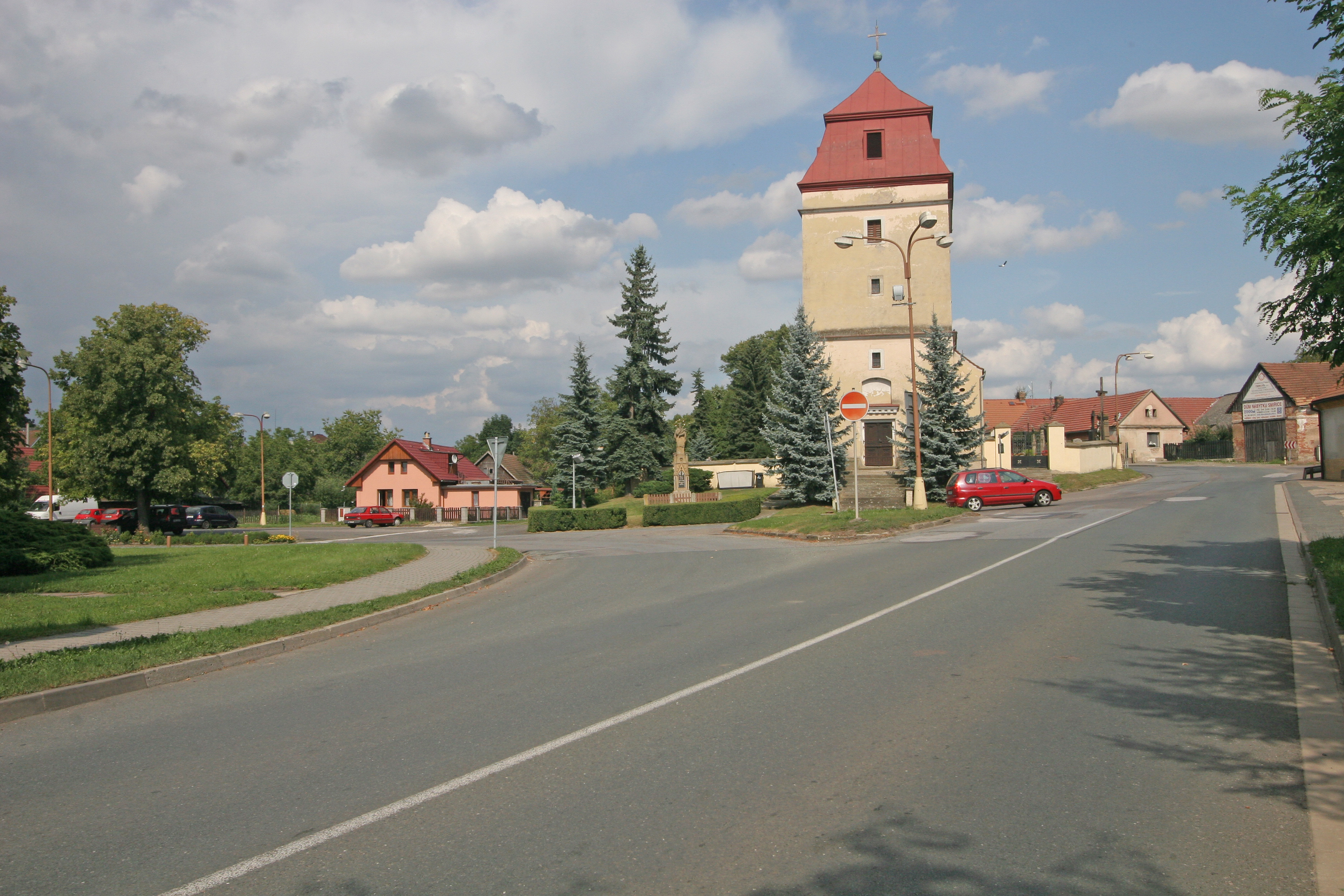
- Church of Saint Michael the Archangel

- Flag Coat of arms

- Location in the Czech Republic
- Coordinates: 50°17′16″N 15°57′50″E
- Country: Czech Republic
- Region: Hradec Králové
- District: Hradec Králové
- First mentioned: 1356

Area
  - Total: 4.84 km^{2} (1.87 sq mi)
- Elevation: 256 m (840 ft)

Population (2026-01-01)
  - Total: 307
  - Density: 63.4/km^{2} (164/sq mi)
- Time zone: UTC+1 (CET)
  - Summer (DST): UTC+2 (CEST)
- Postal code: 503 44
- Website: obeclibrice.cz

Libřice is a municipality and village in Hradec Králové District in the Hradec Králové Region of the Czech Republic. It has about 300 inhabitants.

== Demographics ==
Historical population
Year	Pop.	±%
1869	494	—
1880	533	+7.9%
1890	515	−3.4%
1900	496	−3.7%
1910	476	−4.0%
1921	453	−4.8%
1930	417	−7.9%
1950	315	−24.5%
1961	258	−18.1%
1970	251	−2.7%
1980	277	+10.4%
1991	266	−4.0%
2001	263	−1.1%
2011	280	+6.5%
2021	300	+7.1%
Source: Censuses
