= Vinary (Hradec Králové District) =

- Municipality
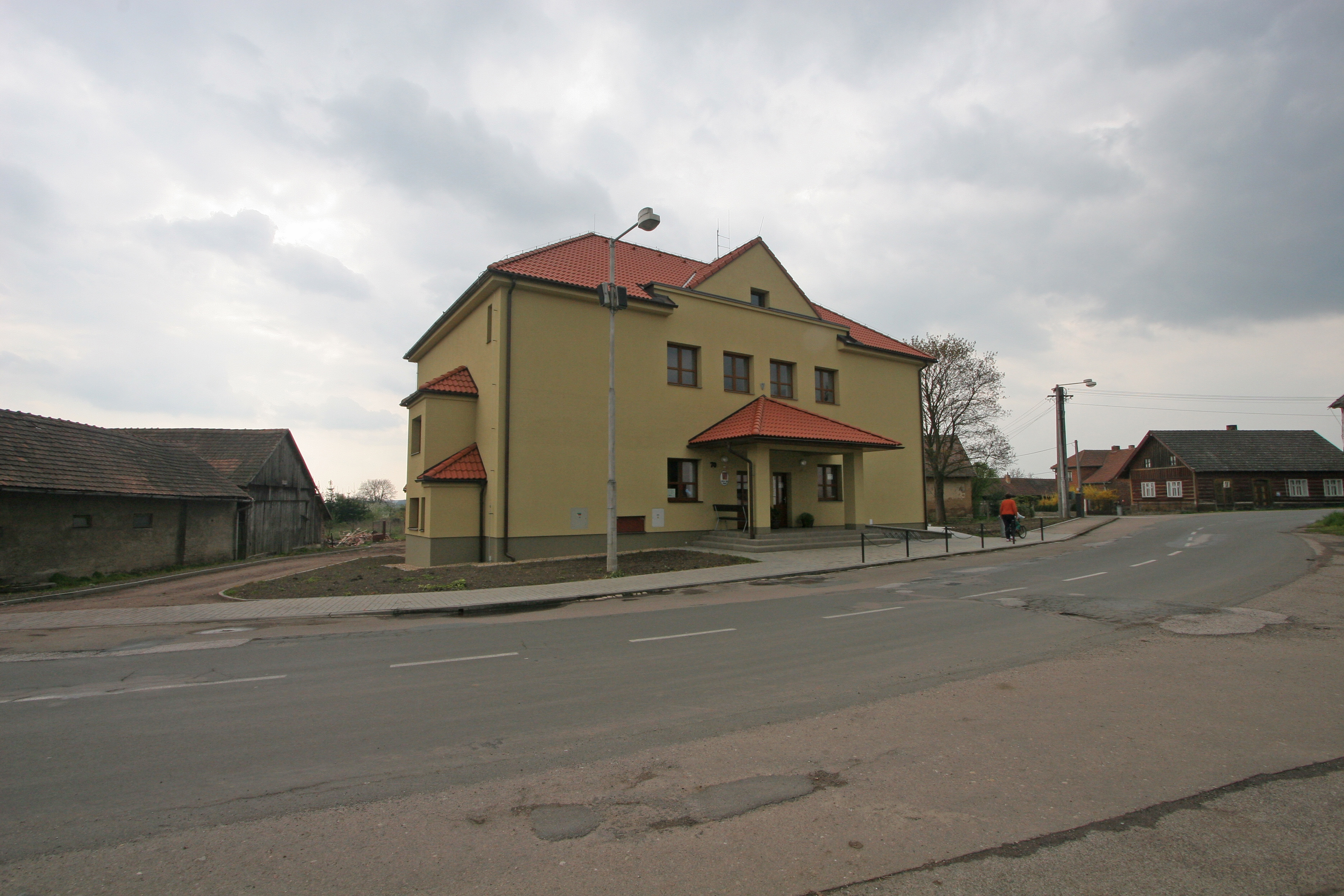
- Municipal office

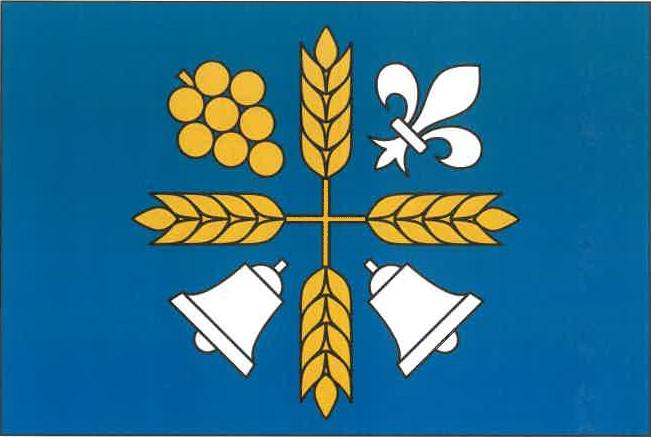
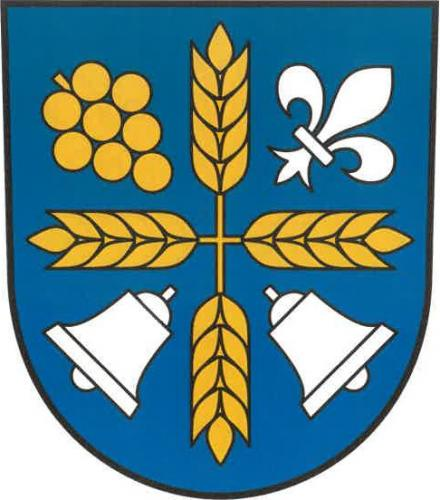
- Flag Coat of arms

- Location in the Czech Republic
- Coordinates: 50°17′22″N 15°25′44″E
- Country: Czech Republic
- Region: Hradec Králové
- District: Hradec Králové
- First mentioned: 1313

Area
  - Total: 10.80 km^{2} (4.17 sq mi)
- Elevation: 255 m (837 ft)

Population (2026-01-01)
  - Total: 472
  - Density: 43.7/km^{2} (113/sq mi)
- Time zone: UTC+1 (CET)
  - Summer (DST): UTC+2 (CEST)
- Postal code: 503 53
- Website: www.vinary.cz

Vinary is a municipality and village in Hradec Králové District in the Hradec Králové Region of the Czech Republic. It has about 500 inhabitants.

== Administrative division ==
Vinary consists of four municipal parts (in brackets population according to the 2021 census):

- Vinary (190)
- Janovice (73)
- Kozojídky (73)
- Smidarská Lhota (106)

== Demographics ==
Historical population
Year	Pop.	±%
1869	1,114	—
1880	1,150	+3.2%
1890	1,164	+1.2%
1900	1,092	−6.2%
1910	1,096	+0.4%
1921	1,128	+2.9%
1930	1,052	−6.7%
1950	783	−25.6%
1961	684	−12.6%
1970	581	−15.1%
1980	582	+0.2%
1991	511	−12.2%
2001	454	−11.2%
2011	432	−4.8%
2021	442	+2.3%
Source: Censuses
