= Světí =

- Municipality
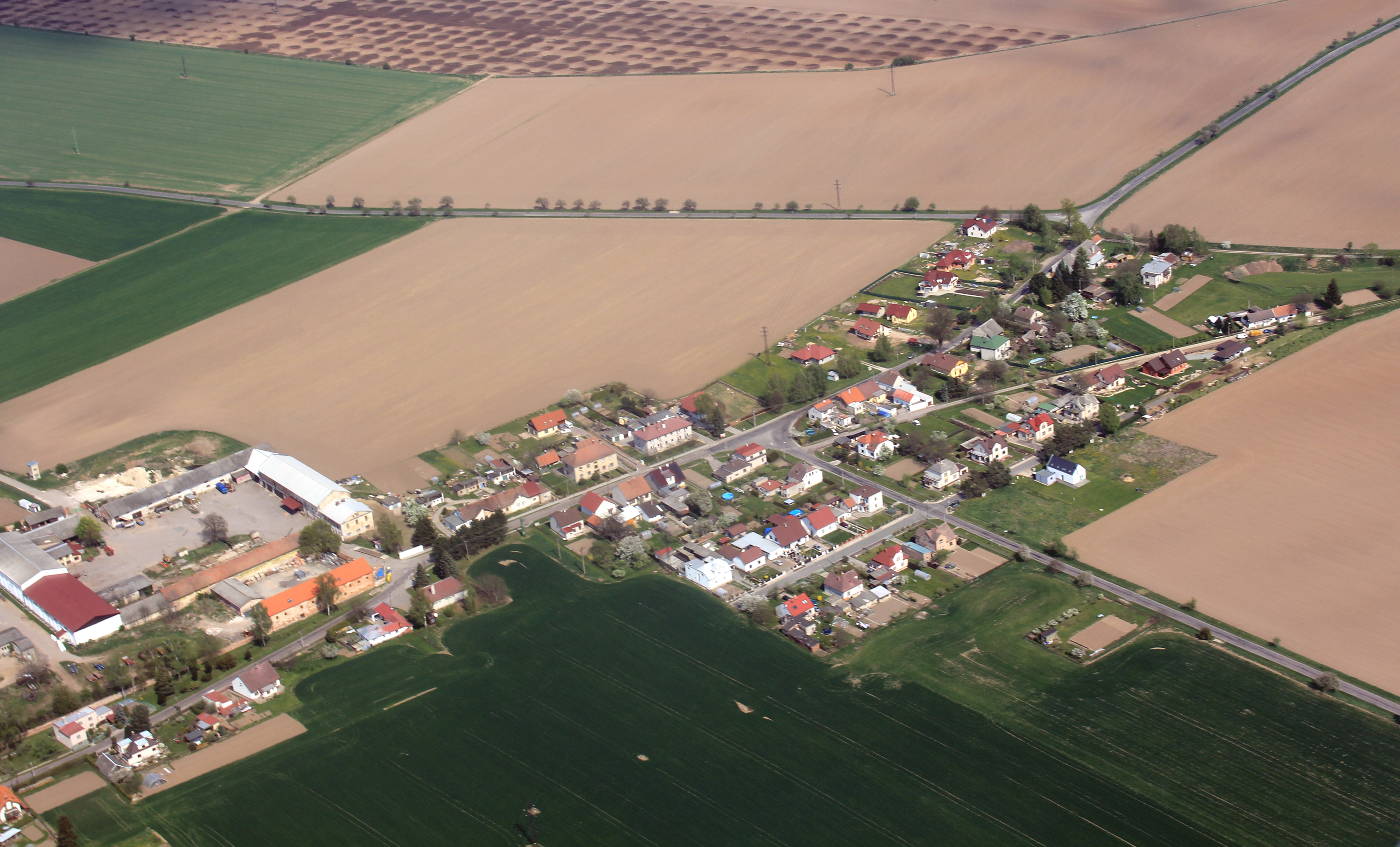
- Aerial view

- Flag Coat of arms

- Location in the Czech Republic
- Coordinates: 50°15′27″N 15°46′32″E
- Country: Czech Republic
- Region: Hradec Králové
- District: Hradec Králové
- First mentioned: 1360

Area
  - Total: 3.20 km^{2} (1.24 sq mi)
- Elevation: 259 m (850 ft)

Population (2026-01-01)
  - Total: 356
  - Density: 111/km^{2} (288/sq mi)
- Time zone: UTC+1 (CET)
  - Summer (DST): UTC+2 (CEST)
- Postal code: 503 12
- Website: www.sveti.cz

Světí is a municipality and village in Hradec Králové District in the Hradec Králové Region of the Czech Republic. It has about 400 inhabitants.

== Demographics ==
Historical population
Year	Pop.	±%
1869	428	—
1880	437	+2.1%
1890	434	−0.7%
1900	408	−6.0%
1910	447	+9.6%
1921	422	−5.6%
1930	428	+1.4%
1950	411	−4.0%
1961	378	−8.0%
1970	342	−9.5%
1980	299	−12.6%
1991	251	−16.1%
2001	251	+0.0%
2011	291	+15.9%
2021	323	+11.0%
Source: Censuses
