= Starý Bydžov =

- Municipality
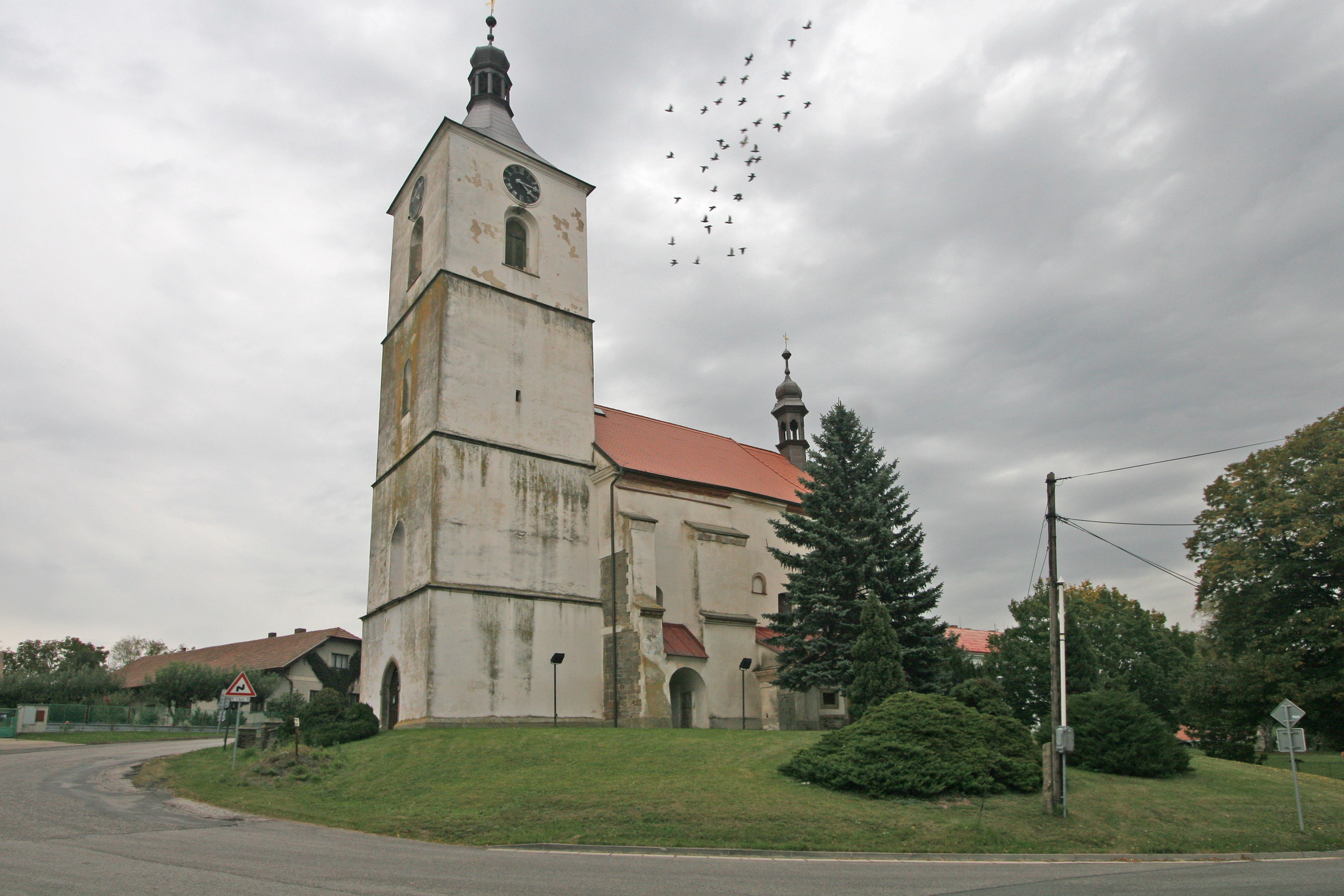
- Church of Saint Procopius

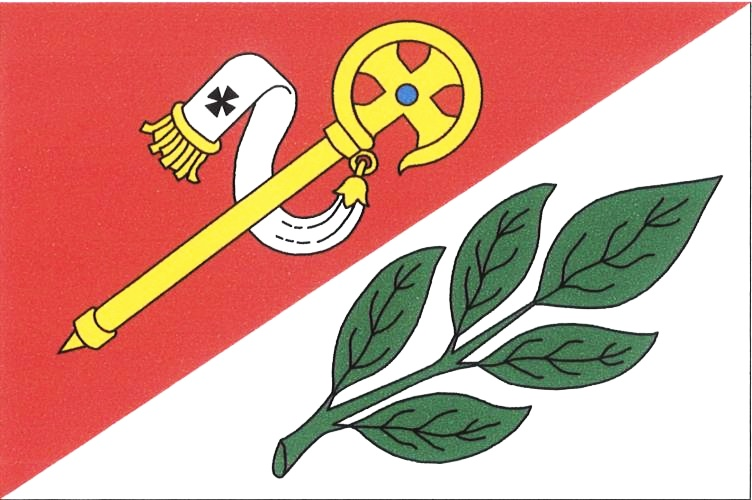
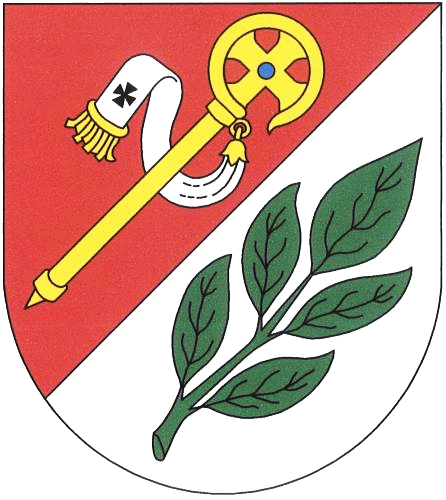
- Flag Coat of arms

- Location in the Czech Republic
- Coordinates: 50°15′31″N 15°27′9″E
- Country: Czech Republic
- Region: Hradec Králové
- District: Hradec Králové
- First mentioned: 1186

Area
  - Total: 7.86 km^{2} (3.03 sq mi)
- Elevation: 259 m (850 ft)

Population (2026-01-01)
  - Total: 423
  - Density: 53.8/km^{2} (139/sq mi)
- Time zone: UTC+1 (CET)
  - Summer (DST): UTC+2 (CEST)
- Postal code: 503 57
- Website: www.starybydzov.cz

Starý Bydžov is a municipality and village in Hradec Králové District in the Hradec Králové Region of the Czech Republic. It has about 400 inhabitants.

== Etymology ==
The initial name of the settlement was just Bydžov. The name was derived from the personal name Bydeš, meaning "Bydeš's (court)". After the town of Nový Bydžov ('new Bydžov') was founded nearby, the older settlement became known as Starý Bydžov ('old Bydžov').

== Demographics ==
Historical population
Year	Pop.	±%
1869	695	—
1880	762	+9.6%
1890	825	+8.3%
1900	943	+14.3%
1910	959	+1.7%
1921	931	−2.9%
1930	907	−2.6%
1950	671	−26.0%
1961	551	−17.9%
1970	442	−19.8%
1980	414	−6.3%
1991	384	−7.2%
2001	403	+4.9%
2011	365	−9.4%
2021	410	+12.3%
Source: Censuses
