= Osičky =

- Municipality
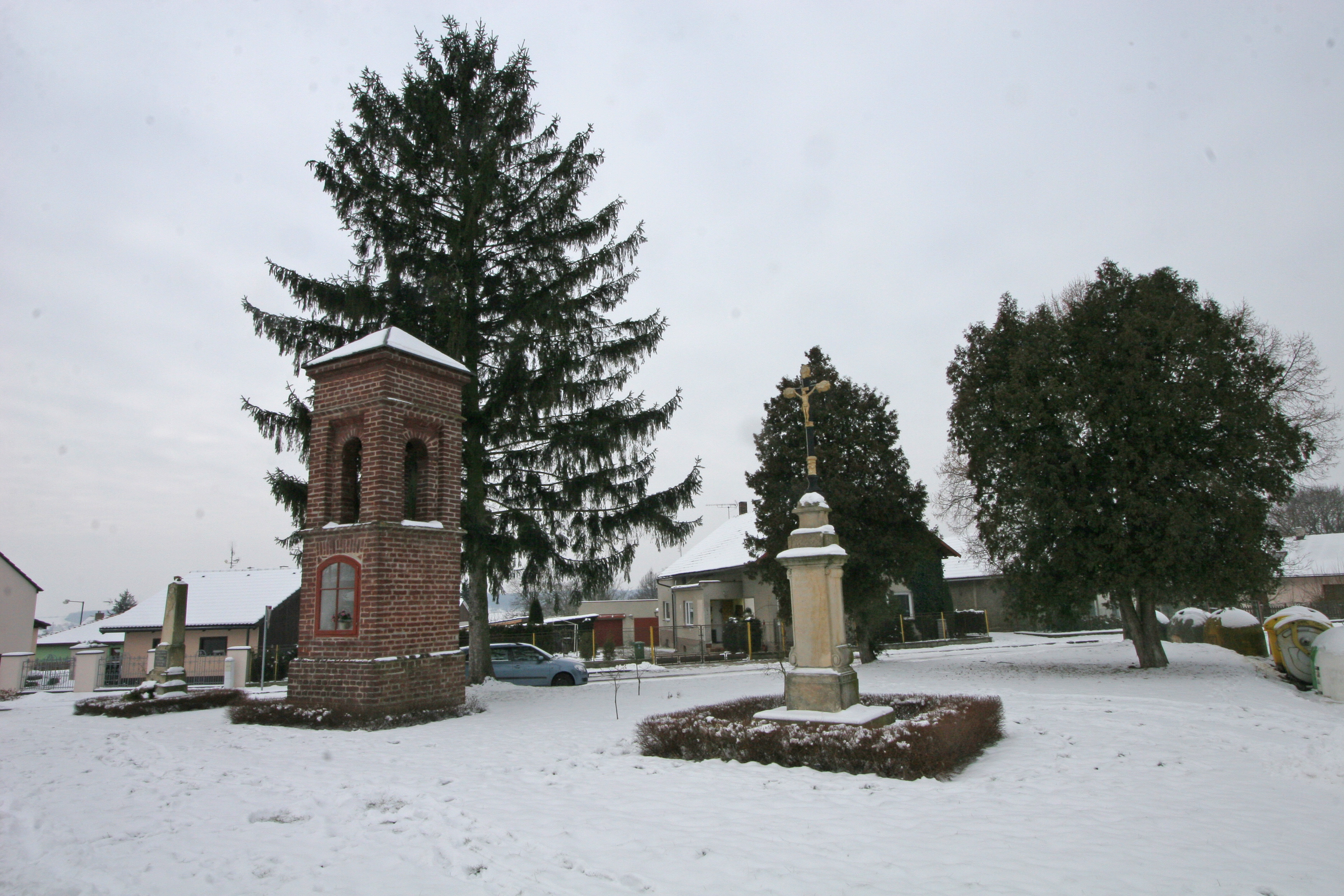
- Centre of Osičky

- Flag Coat of arms

- Location in the Czech Republic
- Coordinates: 50°8′37″N 15°40′35″E
- Country: Czech Republic
- Region: Hradec Králové
- District: Hradec Králové
- First mentioned: 1073

Area
  - Total: 3.32 km^{2} (1.28 sq mi)
- Elevation: 265 m (869 ft)

Population (2026-01-01)
  - Total: 155
  - Density: 46.7/km^{2} (121/sq mi)
- Time zone: UTC+1 (CET)
  - Summer (DST): UTC+2 (CEST)
- Postal code: 503 27
- Website: www.osicky.cz

Osičky is a municipality and village in Hradec Králové District in the Hradec Králové Region of the Czech Republic. It has about 200 inhabitants.

== Demographics ==
Historical population
Year	Pop.	±%
1869	294	—
1880	322	+9.5%
1890	307	−4.7%
1900	296	−3.6%
1910	295	−0.3%
1921	313	+6.1%
1930	290	−7.3%
1950	223	−23.1%
1961	203	−9.0%
1970	174	−14.3%
1980	143	−17.8%
1991	129	−9.8%
2001	133	+3.1%
2011	144	+8.3%
2021	148	+2.8%
Source: Censuses
