= Pšánky =

- Municipality
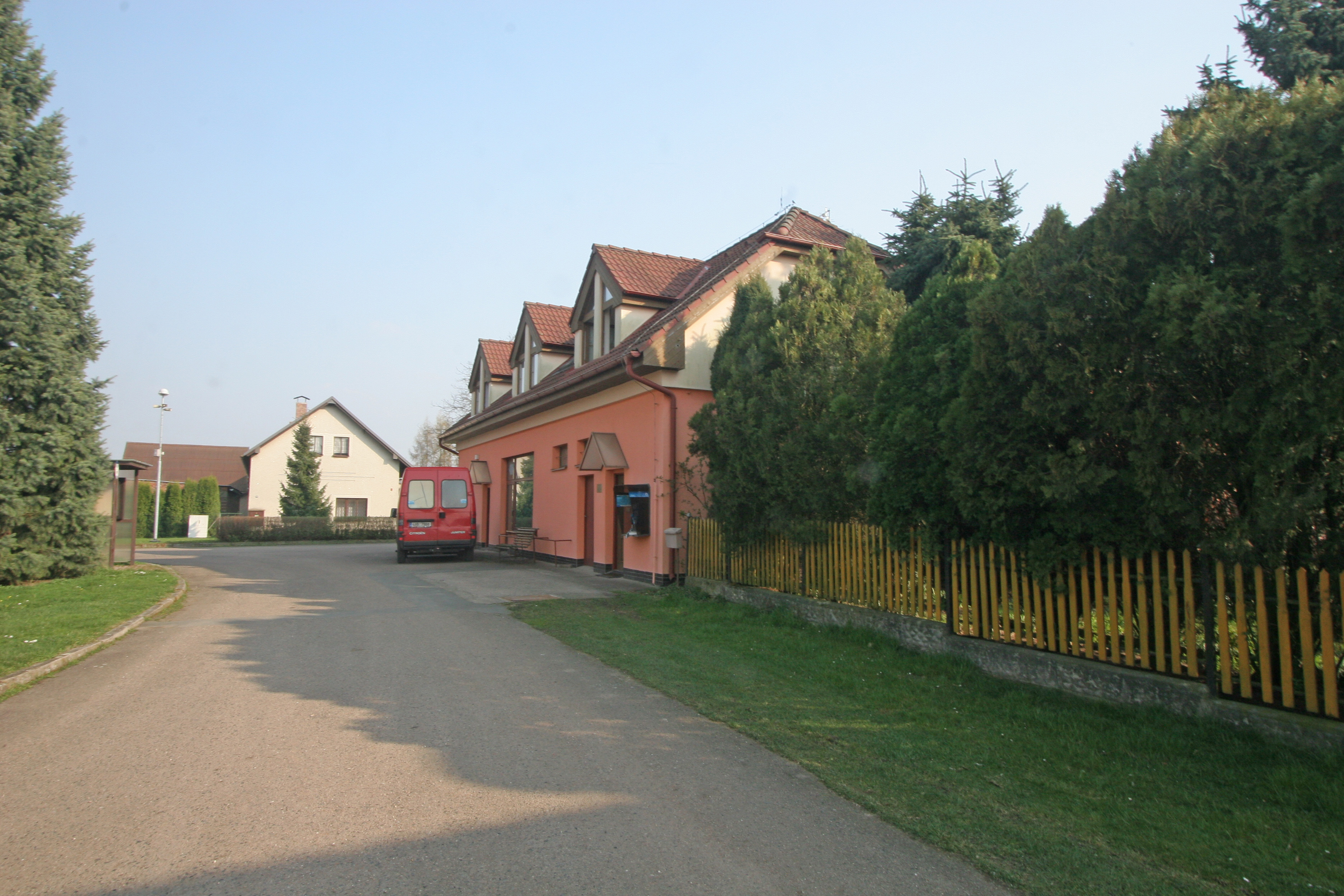
- Municipal office

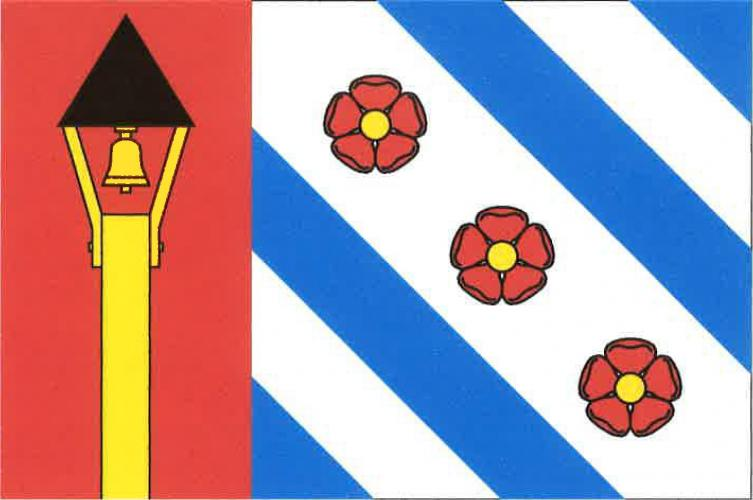
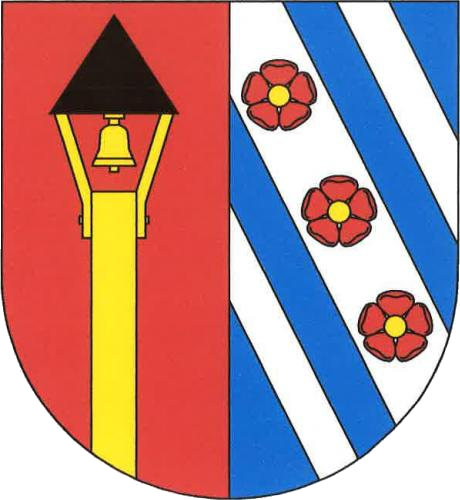
- Flag Coat of arms

- Location in the Czech Republic
- Coordinates: 50°17′39″N 15°37′15″E
- Country: Czech Republic
- Region: Hradec Králové
- District: Hradec Králové
- First mentioned: 1393

Area
  - Total: 2.27 km^{2} (0.88 sq mi)
- Elevation: 260 m (850 ft)

Population (2026-01-01)
  - Total: 72
  - Density: 32/km^{2} (82/sq mi)
- Time zone: UTC+1 (CET)
  - Summer (DST): UTC+2 (CEST)
- Postal code: 503 15
- Website: www.psanky.info

Pšánky is a municipality and village in Hradec Králové District in the Hradec Králové Region of the Czech Republic. It has about 70 inhabitants.

== Demographics ==
Historical population
Year	Pop.	±%
1869	150	—
1880	171	+14.0%
1890	143	−16.4%
1900	165	+15.4%
1910	167	+1.2%
1921	167	+0.0%
1930	144	−13.8%
1950	134	−6.9%
1961	123	−8.2%
1970	96	−22.0%
1980	79	−17.7%
1991	49	−38.0%
2001	48	−2.0%
2011	57	+18.8%
2021	67	+17.5%
Source: Censuses
