= Černožice =

- Municipality
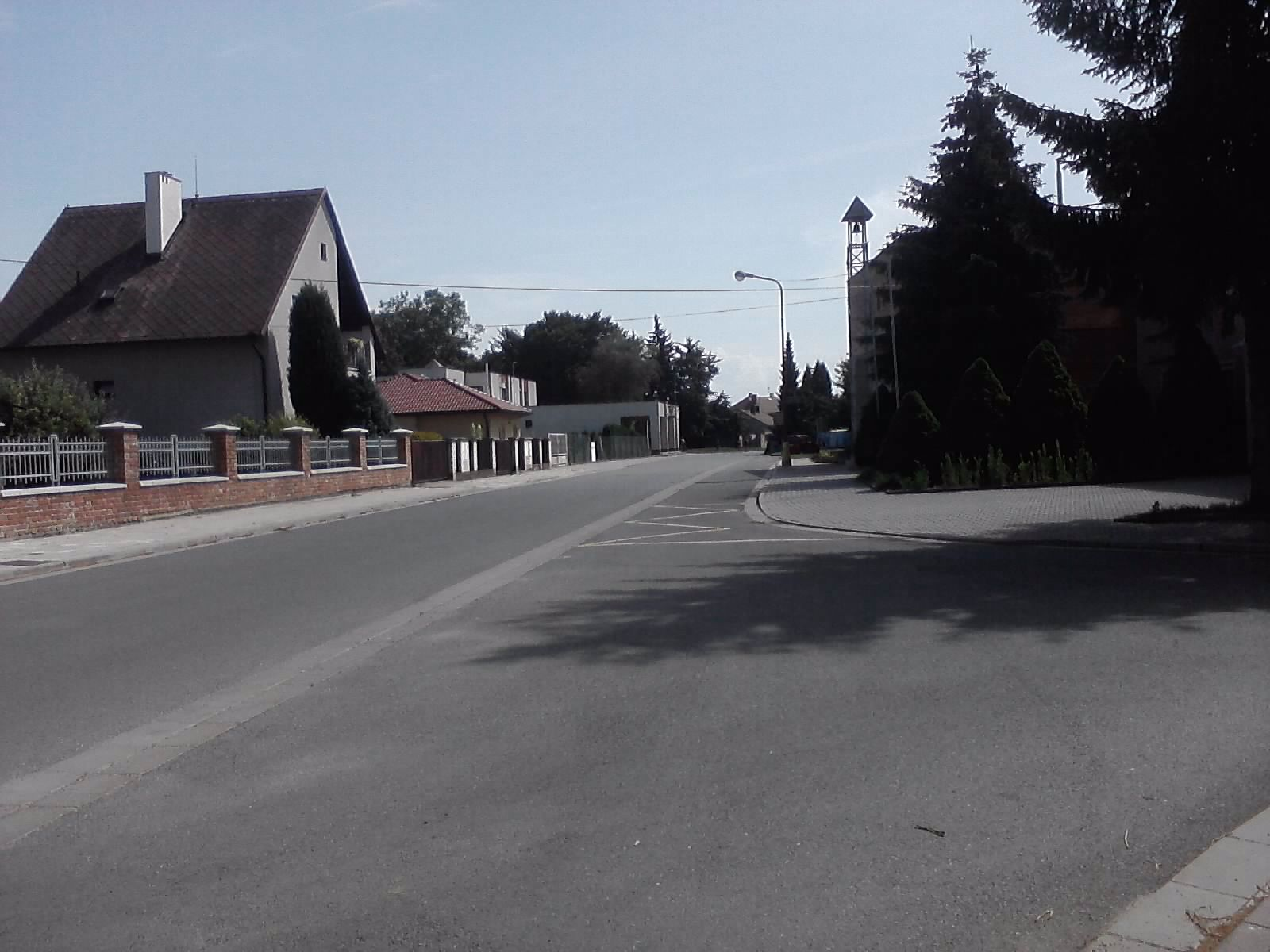
- Centre of Černožice

- Flag Coat of arms

- Location in the Czech Republic
- Coordinates: 50°19′15″N 15°52′23″E
- Country: Czech Republic
- Region: Hradec Králové
- District: Hradec Králové
- First mentioned: 1195

Area
  - Total: 4.23 km^{2} (1.63 sq mi)
- Elevation: 255 m (837 ft)

Population (2026-01-01)
  - Total: 1,080
  - Density: 255/km^{2} (661/sq mi)
- Time zone: UTC+1 (CET)
  - Summer (DST): UTC+2 (CEST)
- Postal code: 503 04
- Website: www.cernozice.cz

Černožice is a municipality and village in Hradec Králové District in the Hradec Králové Region of the Czech Republic. It has about 1,100 inhabitants.

== Demographics ==
Historical population
Year	Pop.	±%
1869	521	—
1880	686	+31.7%
1890	652	−5.0%
1900	676	+3.7%
1910	745	+10.2%
1921	773	+3.8%
1930	1,025	+32.6%
1950	849	−17.2%
1961	985	+16.0%
1970	1,002	+1.7%
1980	1,111	+10.9%
1991	1,193	+7.4%
2001	1,230	+3.1%
2011	1,154	−6.2%
2021	1,100	−4.7%
Source: Censuses
