= Chudeřice =

- Municipality
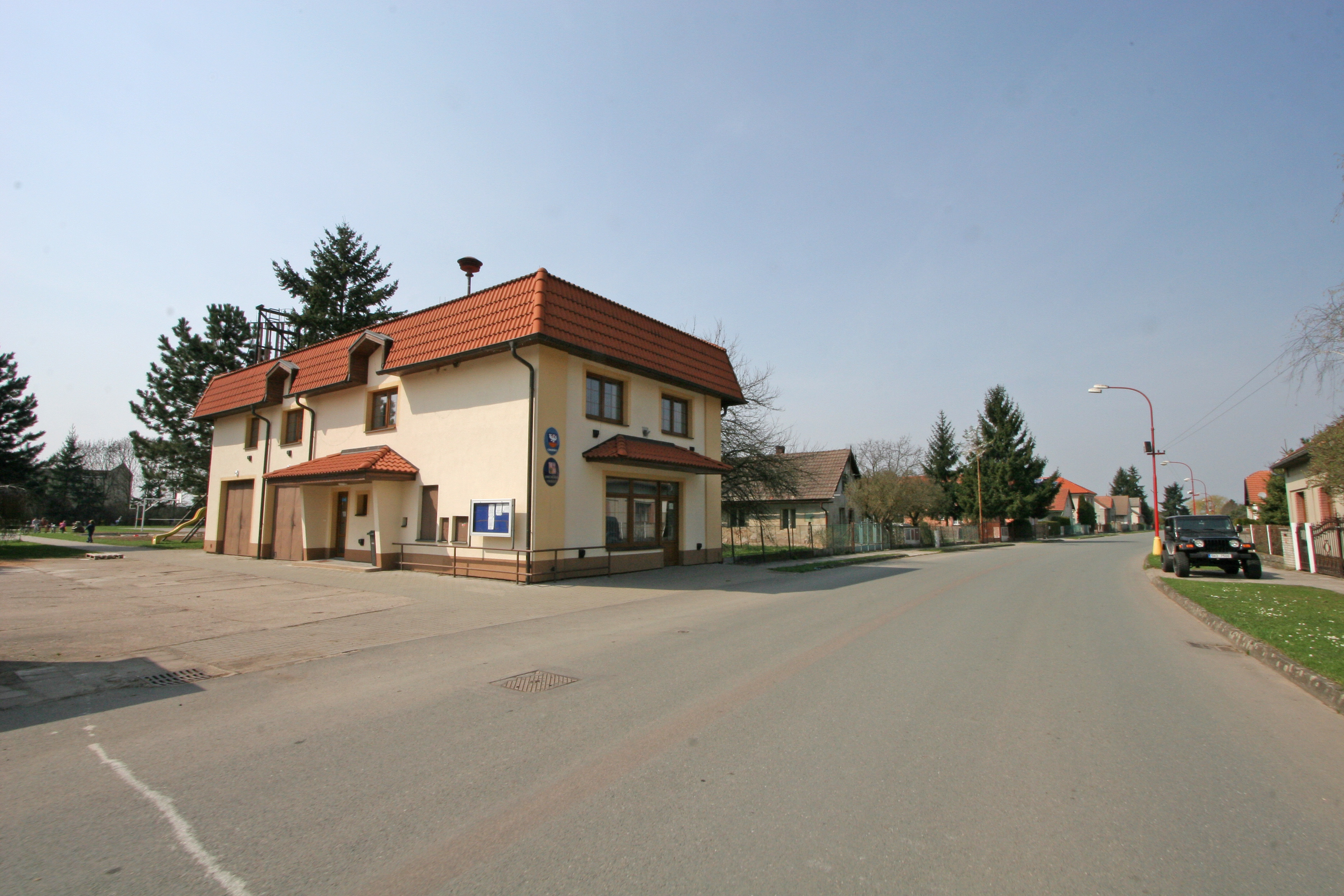
- Municipal office

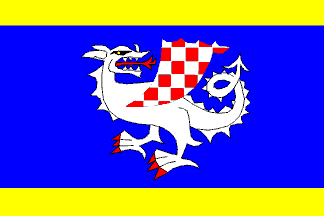
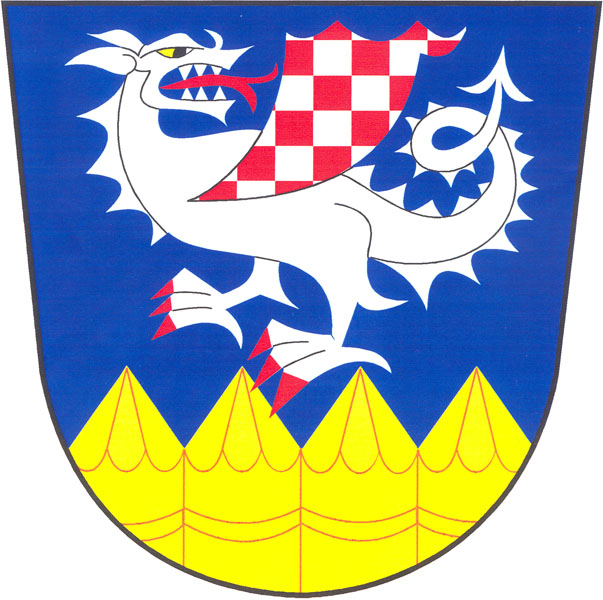
- Flag Coat of arms

- Location in the Czech Republic
- Coordinates: 50°8′57″N 15°33′3″E
- Country: Czech Republic
- Region: Hradec Králové
- District: Hradec Králové
- First mentioned: 1318

Area
  - Total: 2.15 km^{2} (0.83 sq mi)
- Elevation: 230 m (750 ft)

Population (2026-01-01)
  - Total: 274
  - Density: 127/km^{2} (330/sq mi)
- Time zone: UTC+1 (CET)
  - Summer (DST): UTC+2 (CEST)
- Postal code: 503 51
- Website: www.chuderice.cz

Chudeřice is a municipality and village in Hradec Králové District in the Hradec Králové Region of the Czech Republic. It has about 300 inhabitants.

== Demographics ==
Historical population
Year	Pop.	±%
1869	201	—
1880	224	+11.4%
1890	229	+2.2%
1900	178	−22.3%
1910	184	+3.4%
1921	194	+5.4%
1930	201	+3.6%
1950	150	−25.4%
1961	157	+4.7%
1970	157	+0.0%
1980	165	+5.1%
1991	191	+15.8%
2001	195	+2.1%
2011	240	+23.1%
2021	270	+12.5%
Source: Censuses
