= Káranice =

- Municipality
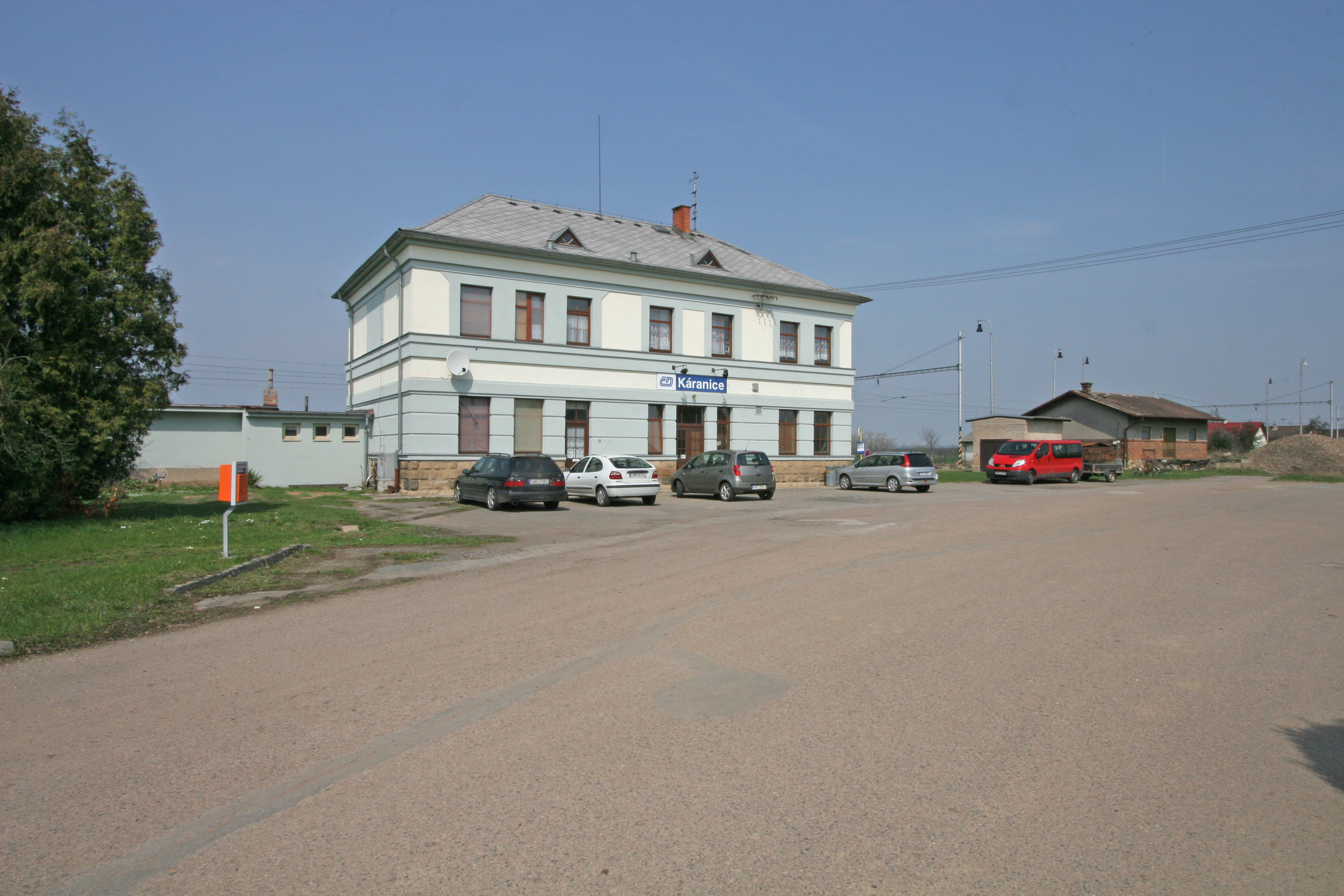
- Train station

- Location in the Czech Republic
- Coordinates: 50°9′11″N 15°33′27″E
- Country: Czech Republic
- Region: Hradec Králové
- District: Hradec Králové
- First mentioned: 1429

Area
  - Total: 3.00 km^{2} (1.16 sq mi)
- Elevation: 236 m (774 ft)

Population (2026-01-01)
  - Total: 212
  - Density: 70.7/km^{2} (183/sq mi)
- Time zone: UTC+1 (CET)
  - Summer (DST): UTC+2 (CEST)
- Postal code: 503 66
- Website: www.karanice.cz

Káranice is a municipality and village in Hradec Králové District in the Hradec Králové Region of the Czech Republic. It has about 200 inhabitants.

== Demographics ==
Historical population
| Year | Pop. | ±% |
|---|---|---|
| 1869 | 215 | — |
| 1880 | 220 | +2.3% |
| 1890 | 219 | −0.5% |
| 1900 | 238 | +8.7% |
| 1910 | 242 | +1.7% |
| 1921 | 245 | +1.2% |
| 1930 | 295 | +20.4% |
| 1950 | 213 | −27.8% |
| 1961 | 206 | −3.3% |
| 1970 | 203 | −1.5% |
| 1980 | 211 | +3.9% |
| 1991 | 173 | −18.0% |
| 2001 | 183 | +5.8% |
| 2011 | 187 | +2.2% |
| 2021 | 188 | +0.5% |
Source: Censuses
