= Klamoš =

- Municipality
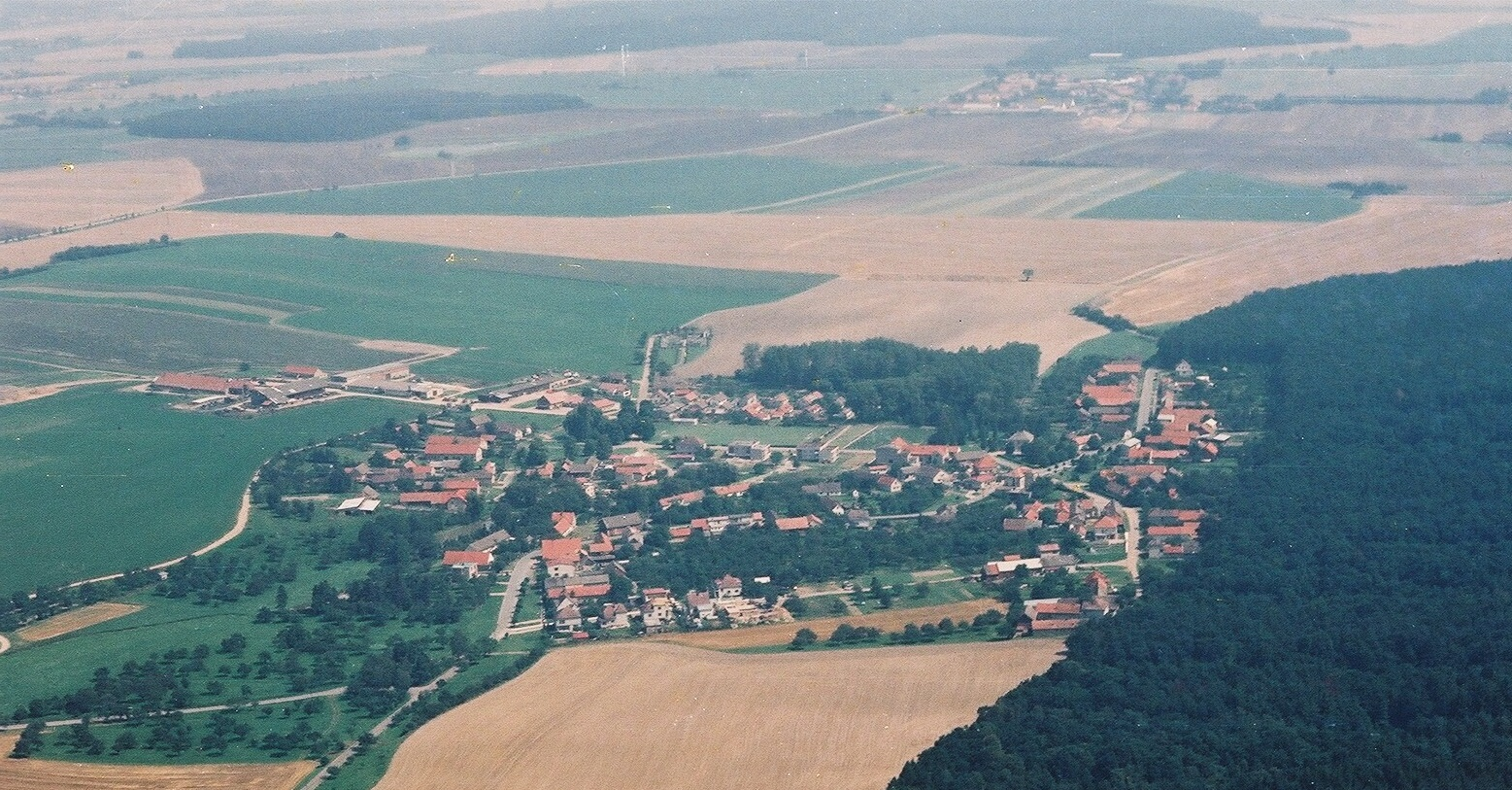
- Aerial view

- Flag Coat of arms

- Location in the Czech Republic
- Coordinates: 50°7′32″N 15°30′5″E
- Country: Czech Republic
- Region: Hradec Králové
- District: Hradec Králové
- First mentioned: 1379

Area
  - Total: 13.84 km^{2} (5.34 sq mi)
- Elevation: 232 m (761 ft)

Population (2026-01-01)
  - Total: 393
  - Density: 28.4/km^{2} (73.5/sq mi)
- Time zone: UTC+1 (CET)
  - Summer (DST): UTC+2 (CEST)
- Postal code: 503 51
- Website: www.klamos.cz

Klamoš is a municipality and village in Hradec Králové District in the Hradec Králové Region of the Czech Republic. It has about 400 inhabitants.

== Administrative division ==
Klamoš consists of two municipal parts (in brackets population according to the 2021 census):

- Klamoš (321)
- Štít (70)

== Demographics ==
Historical population
Year	Pop.	±%
1869	564	—
1880	633	+12.2%
1890	646	+2.1%
1900	652	+0.9%
1910	642	−1.5%
1921	639	−0.5%
1930	675	+5.6%
1950	502	−25.6%
1961	503	+0.2%
1970	473	−6.0%
1980	452	−4.4%
1991	413	−8.6%
2001	421	+1.9%
2011	381	−9.5%
2021	391	+2.6%
Source: Censuses
