= Radíkovice =

- Municipality
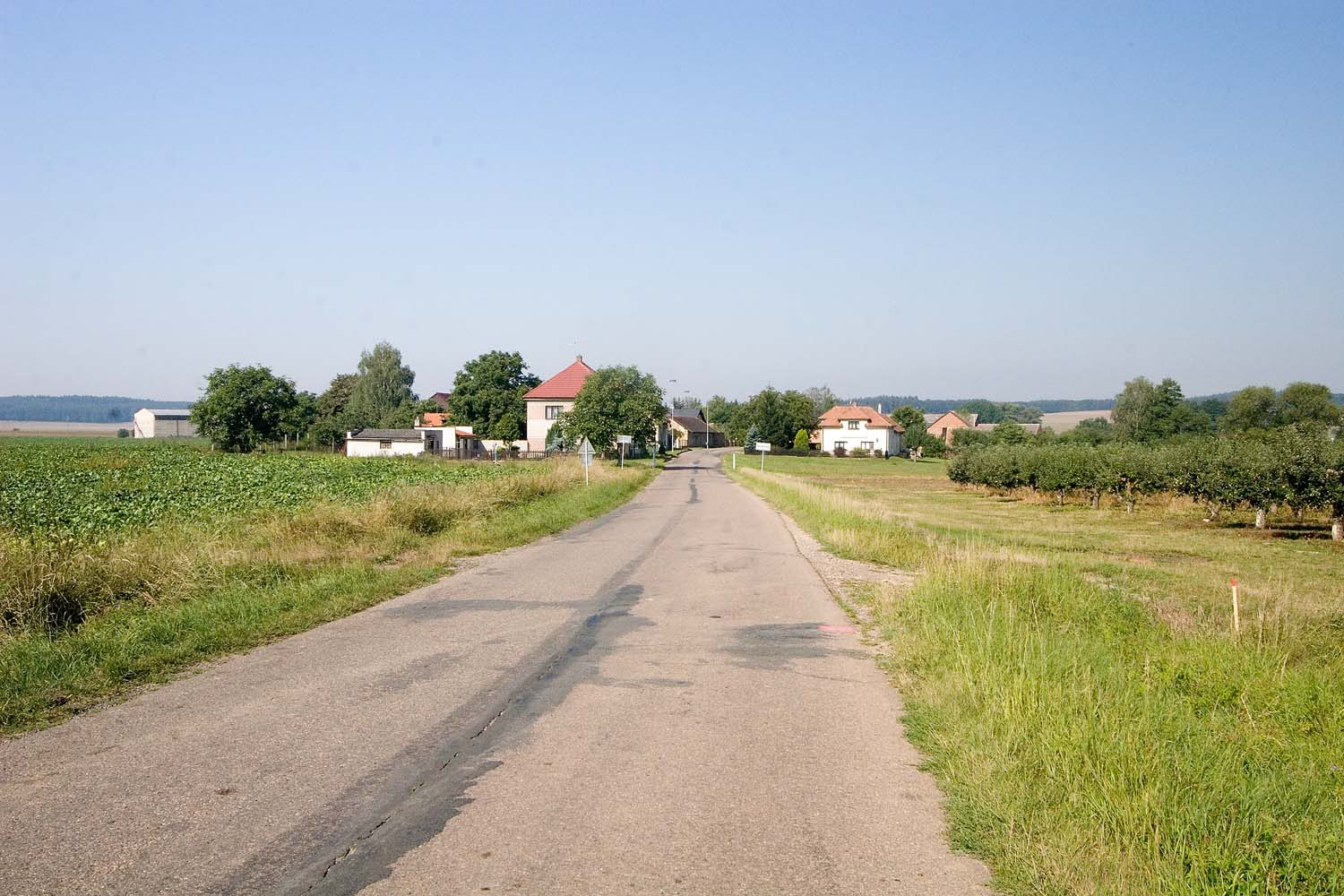
- View from the east

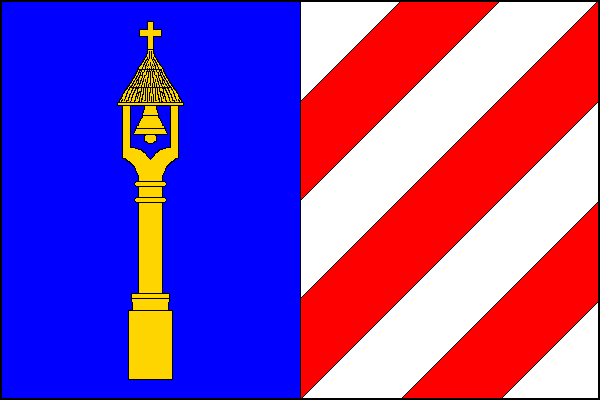
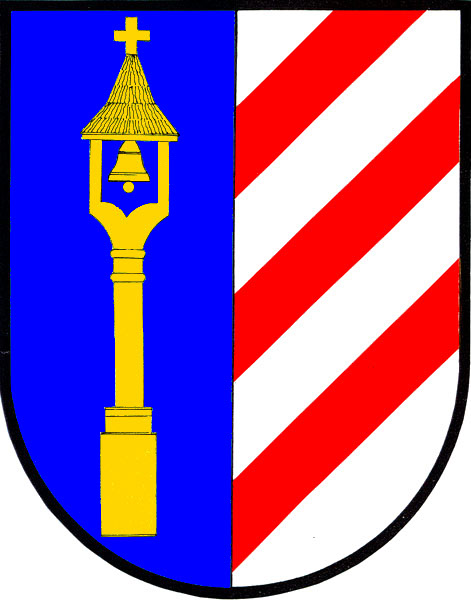
- Flag Coat of arms

- Location in the Czech Republic
- Coordinates: 50°12′34″N 15°41′37″E
- Country: Czech Republic
- Region: Hradec Králové
- District: Hradec Králové
- First mentioned: 1365

Area
  - Total: 3.84 km^{2} (1.48 sq mi)
- Elevation: 255 m (837 ft)

Population (2026-01-01)
  - Total: 204
  - Density: 53.1/km^{2} (138/sq mi)
- Time zone: UTC+1 (CET)
  - Summer (DST): UTC+2 (CEST)
- Postal code: 503 27
- Website: www.radikovice.net

Radíkovice (Czech pronunciation: [ˈraɟiːkovɪtsɛ]) is a municipality and village in Hradec Králové District in the Hradec Králové Region of the Czech Republic. It has about 200 inhabitants.

== Demographics ==
Historical population
Year	Pop.	±%
1869	234	—
1880	222	−5.1%
1890	220	−0.9%
1900	207	−5.9%
1910	217	+4.8%
1921	228	+5.1%
1930	179	−21.5%
1950	152	−15.1%
1961	147	−3.3%
1970	158	+7.5%
1980	142	−10.1%
1991	153	+7.7%
2001	164	+7.2%
2011	176	+7.3%
2021	216	+22.7%
Source: Censuses
