= Šaplava =

- Municipality
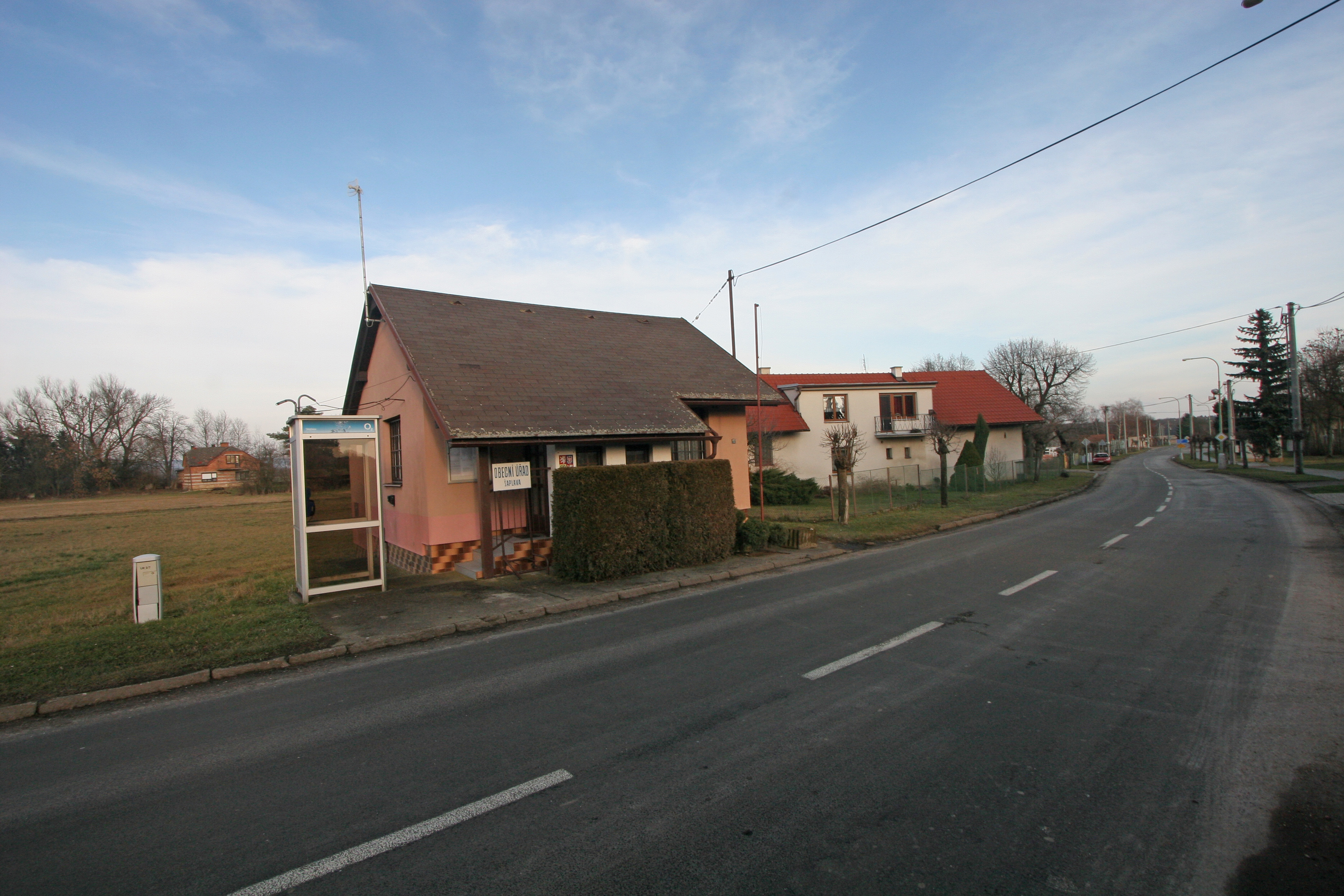
- Municipal office and the main street

- Flag Coat of arms

- Location in the Czech Republic
- Coordinates: 50°18′54″N 15°32′31″E
- Country: Czech Republic
- Region: Hradec Králové
- District: Hradec Králové
- First mentioned: 1381

Area
  - Total: 2.01 km^{2} (0.78 sq mi)
- Elevation: 251 m (823 ft)

Population (2026-01-01)
  - Total: 110
  - Density: 55/km^{2} (140/sq mi)
- Time zone: UTC+1 (CET)
  - Summer (DST): UTC+2 (CEST)
- Postal code: 503 53
- Website: www.saplava.cz

Šaplava is a municipality and village in Hradec Králové District in the Hradec Králové Region of the Czech Republic. It has about 100 inhabitants.

== Demographics ==
Historical population
Year	Pop.	±%
1869	248	—
1880	271	+9.3%
1890	300	+10.7%
1900	286	−4.7%
1910	277	−3.1%
1921	281	+1.4%
1930	286	+1.8%
1950	236	−17.5%
1961	211	−10.6%
1970	172	−18.5%
1980	162	−5.8%
1991	126	−22.2%
2001	113	−10.3%
2011	122	+8.0%
2021	112	−8.2%
Source: Censuses
