= Hradec Králové District =

Hradec Králové District Okres Hradec Králové
- District
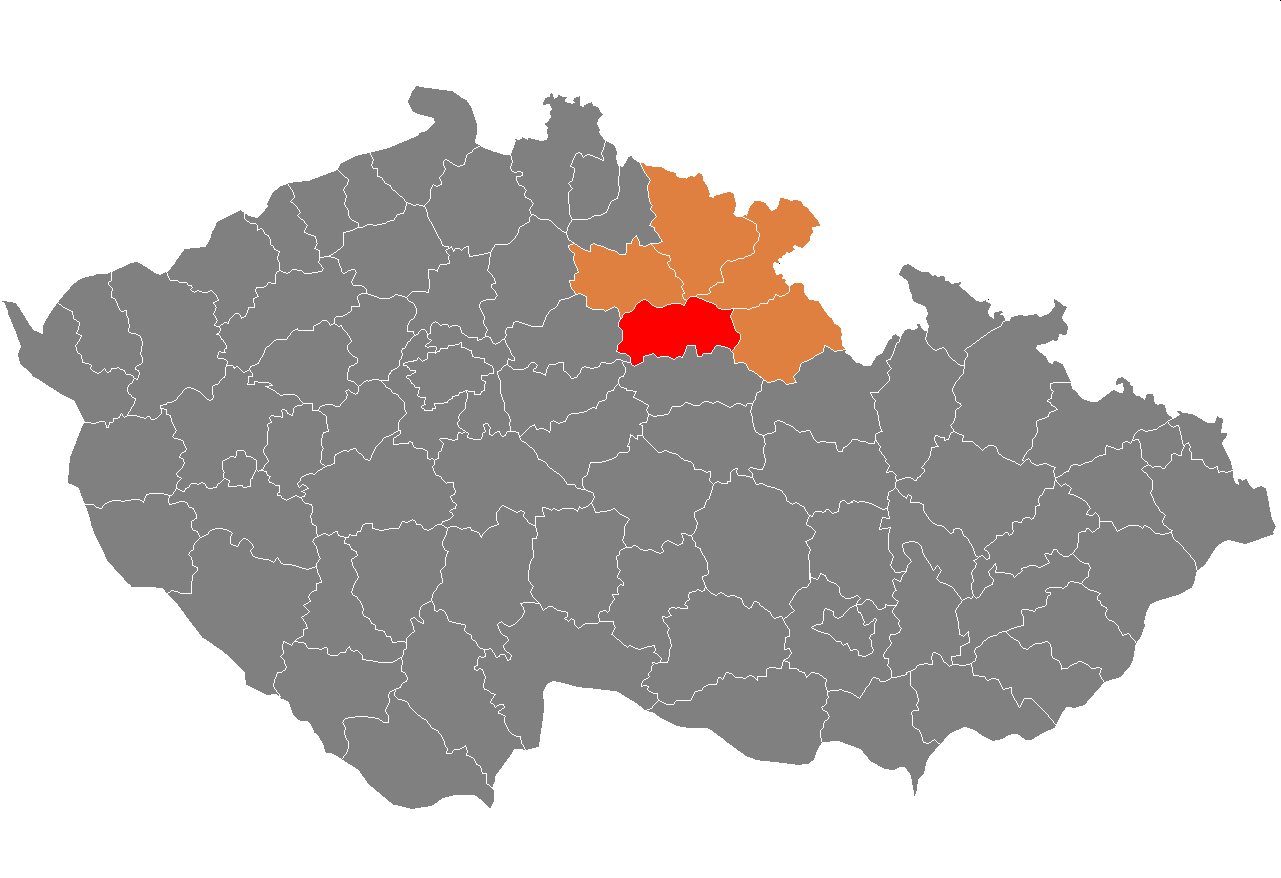
- Location in the Hradec Králové Region within the Czech Republic
- Coordinates: 50°14′N 15°43′E
- Country: Czech Republic
- Region: Hradec Králové
- Capital: Hradec Králové

Area
  - Total: 891.67 km^{2} (344.28 sq mi)

Population (2026)
  - Total: 167,887
  - Density: 188.28/km^{2} (487.65/sq mi)
- Time zone: UTC+1 (CET)
  - Summer (DST): UTC+2 (CEST)
- Municipalities: 104
- * Cities and towns: 6
- * Market towns: 0

Hradec Králové District (Czech: okres Hradec Králové) is a district in the Hradec Králové Region of the Czech Republic. Its capital is the city of Hradec Králové.

== Administrative division ==
Hradec Králové District is divided into two administrative districts of municipalities with extended competence: Hradec Králové and Nový Bydžov.

=== List of municipalities ===
Cities and towns are marked in bold:

Babice – Barchov – Běleč nad Orlicí – Benátky – Blešno – Boharyně – Černilov – Černožice – Chlumec nad Cidlinou – Chudeřice – Čistěves – Divec – Dobřenice – Dohalice – Dolní Přím – Habřina – Hlušice – Hněvčeves – Holohlavy – Hořiněves – Hradec Králové – Hrádek – Humburky – Hvozdnice – Jeníkovice – Jílovice – Káranice – Klamoš – Kobylice – Kosice – Kosičky – Králíky – Kratonohy – Kunčice – Ledce – Lejšovka – Lhota pod Libčany – Libčany – Libníkovice – Librantice – Libřice – Lišice – Lochenice – Lodín – Lovčice – Lužany – Lužec nad Cidlinou – Máslojedy – Měník – Mlékosrby – Mokrovousy – Myštěves – Mžany – Neděliště – Nechanice – Nepolisy – Nové Město – Nový Bydžov – Obědovice – Ohnišťany – Olešnice – Osice – Osičky – Petrovice – Písek – Prasek – Praskačka – Předměřice nad Labem – Převýšov – Pšánky – Puchlovice – Račice nad Trotinou – Radíkovice – Radostov – Roudnice – Sadová – Šaplava – Sendražice – Skalice – Skřivany – Sloupno – Smidary – Smiřice – Smržov – Sovětice – Stará Voda – Starý Bydžov – Stěžery – Stračov – Střezetice – Světí – Syrovátka – Těchlovice – Třebechovice pod Orebem – Třesovice – Urbanice – Vinary – Vrchovnice – Všestary – Výrava – Vysoká nad Labem – Vysoký Újezd – Zachrašťany – Zdechovice –

== Geography ==
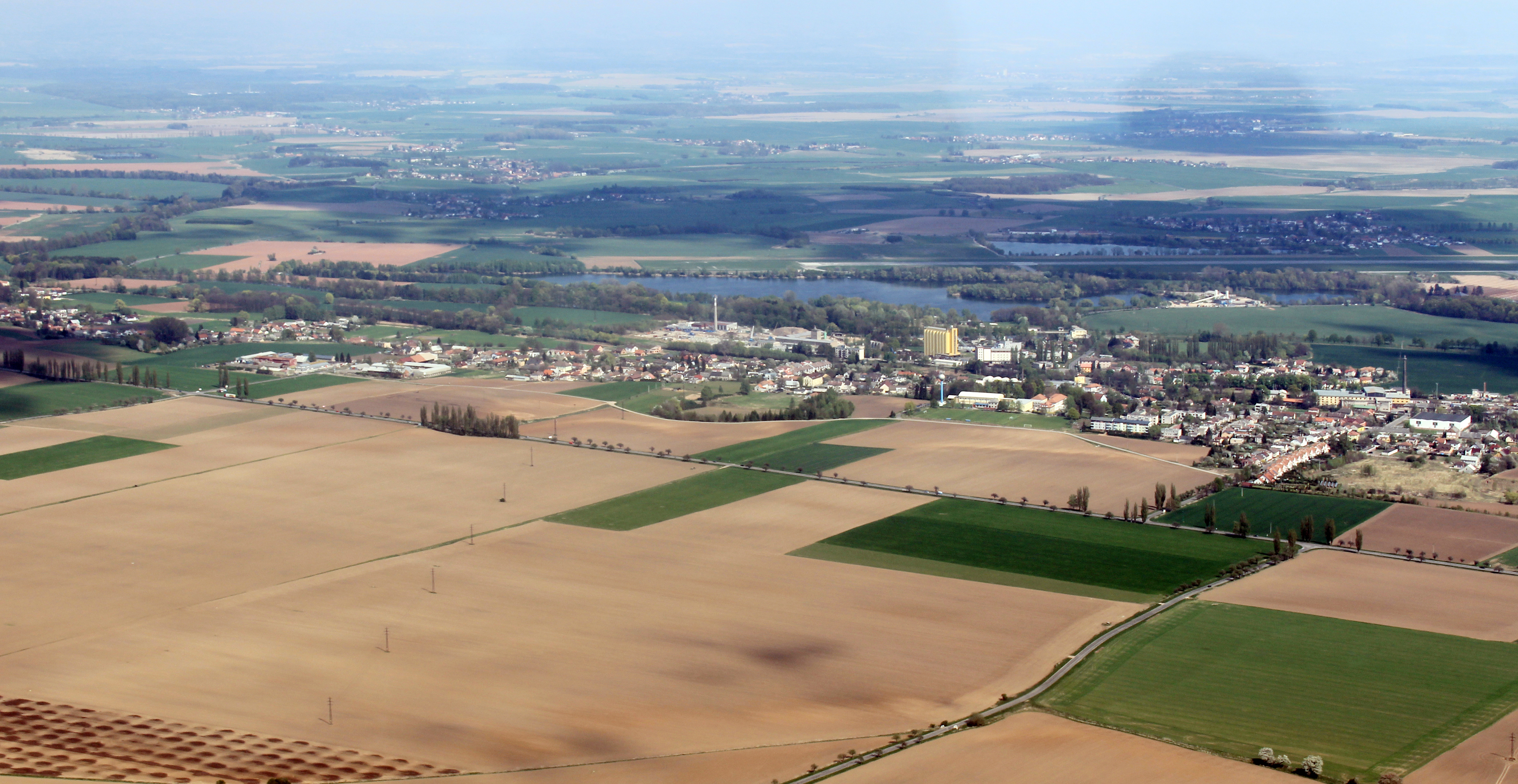
Předměřice nad Labem and surrounding landscape

The terrain consists of slightly undulating landscape, transitioning to extensive plains. The territory extends into three geomorphological mesoregions: East Elbe Table (most of the territory), Orlice Table (east) and Central Elbe Table (small part in the southwest). The highest point of the district is the hill Svíb in Máslojedy with an elevation of 332 m (1,089 ft), the lowest point is the river bed of the Cidlina in Olešnice at 207 m (679 ft).

From the total district area of 891.7 km^{2} (344.3 sq mi), agricultural land occupies 622.1 km^{2} (240.2 sq mi), forests occupy 148.9 km^{2} (57.5 sq mi), and water area occupies 19.3 km^{2} (7.5 sq mi). Forests cover 16.7% of the district's area.

The territory is rich in watercourses. The most significant river is the Elbe, which passes through the eastern part of the district. The Orlice joins the Elbe in Hradec Králové. The western part of the territory is drained by the Cidlina, which heads to the Elbe outside the district. A notable river is the Bystřice, a tributary of the Cidlina. No significant bodies of water are found in the area. Flooded quarries after sand mining are typical for the district.

There are no large-scale protected areas.

== Demographics ==
Historical population

| Year | Pop. | ±% |
|---|---|---|
| 1869 | 101,532 | — |
| 1880 | 114,055 | +12.3% |
| 1890 | 115,922 | +1.6% |
| 1900 | 119,607 | +3.2% |
| 1910 | 127,982 | +7.0% |

| Year | Pop. | ±% |
|---|---|---|
| 1921 | 128,446 | +0.4% |
| 1930 | 138,689 | +8.0% |
| 1950 | 128,597 | −7.3% |
| 1961 | 138,514 | +7.7% |
| 1970 | 147,481 | +6.5% |

| Year | Pop. | ±% |
|---|---|---|
| 1980 | 161,732 | +9.7% |
| 1991 | 162,662 | +0.6% |
| 2001 | 161,178 | −0.9% |
| 2011 | 162,661 | +0.9% |
| 2021 | 163,175 | +0.3% |

Source: Censuses

=== Most populous municipalities ===
| Name | Population | Area (km^{2}) |
|---|---|---|
| Hradec Králové | 93,534 | 106 |
| Nový Bydžov | 7,298 | 35 |
| Třebechovice pod Orebem | 5,907 | 21 |
| Chlumec nad Cidlinou | 5,606 | 21 |
| Smiřice | 3,142 | 11 |
| Nechanice | 2,545 | 28 |
| Černilov | 2,488 | 26 |
| Stěžery | 2,140 | 13 |
| Předměřice nad Labem | 1,968 | 5 |
| Vysoká nad Labem | 1,804 | 15 |

== Economy ==
The largest employers with headquarters in Hradec Králové District and at least 500 employees are:

| Economic entity | Location | Number of employees | Main activity |
|---|---|---|---|
| University Hospital Hradec Králové | Hradec Králové | 5,000–9,999 | Health care |
| Lesy České republiky | Hradec Králové | 4,000–4,999 | Forestry and logging |
| Marius Pedersen | Hradec Králové | 2,000–2,499 | Waste collection |
| Regional Police Directorate of the Hradec Králové Region | Hradec Králové | 2,000–2,499 | Public order and safety activities |
| Arrow International CR | Hradec Králové | 1,000–1,499 | Manufacture of medical instruments |
| University of Hradec Králové | Hradec Králové | 1,000–1,499 | Education |
| City of Hradec Králové | Hradec Králové | 500–999 | Public administration |
| Hasičský záchranný sbor Královéhradeckého kraje | Hradec Králové | 500–999 | Fire service activities |
| Hradec Králové Region | Hradec Králové | 500–999 | Public administration |
| Povodí Labe | Hradec Králové | 500–999 | Water treatment |
| Zdravotnická záchranná služba Královéhradeckého kraje | Hradec Králové | 500–999 | Health care |
| Datwyler Sealing Technologies CZ | Nový Bydžov | 500–999 | Manufacture of rubber products |
| Trivium Packaging Czech Republic | Skřivany | 500–999 | Manufacture of light metal packaging |

== Transport ==
The D11 motorway (part of the European route E67), which leads from Prague to Hradec Králové and continues to the Czech–Polish border, runs through the district.

== Sights ==
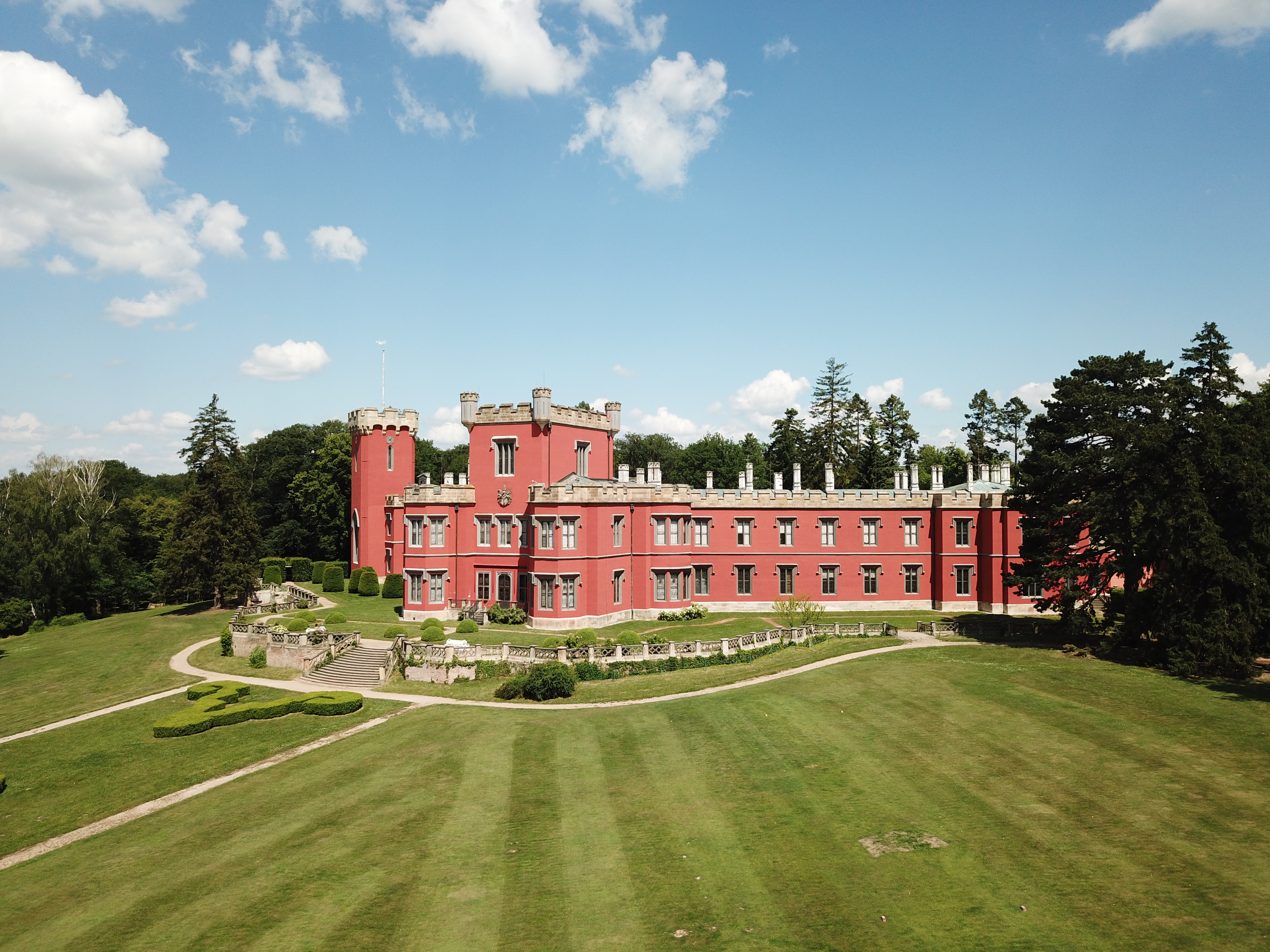
Hrádek u Nechanic Castle

The most important monuments in the district, protected as national cultural monuments, are:

- Museum of Eastern Bohemia
- Chapel of the Epiphany in Smiřice
- Probošt's mechanical Christmas crib
- Hrádek u Nechanic Castle

The best-preserved settlements and landscapes, protected as monument reservations and monument zones, are:

- Hradec Králové (includes both a monument reservation and a monument zone)
- Nový Bydžov
- Libeň
- Vysočany
- Battlefield of the Battle of Königgrätz

The most visited tourist destinations are the Hrádek u Nechanic Castle, Karlova Koruna Chateau and White Tower in Hradec Králové.
