= Librantice =

- Municipality
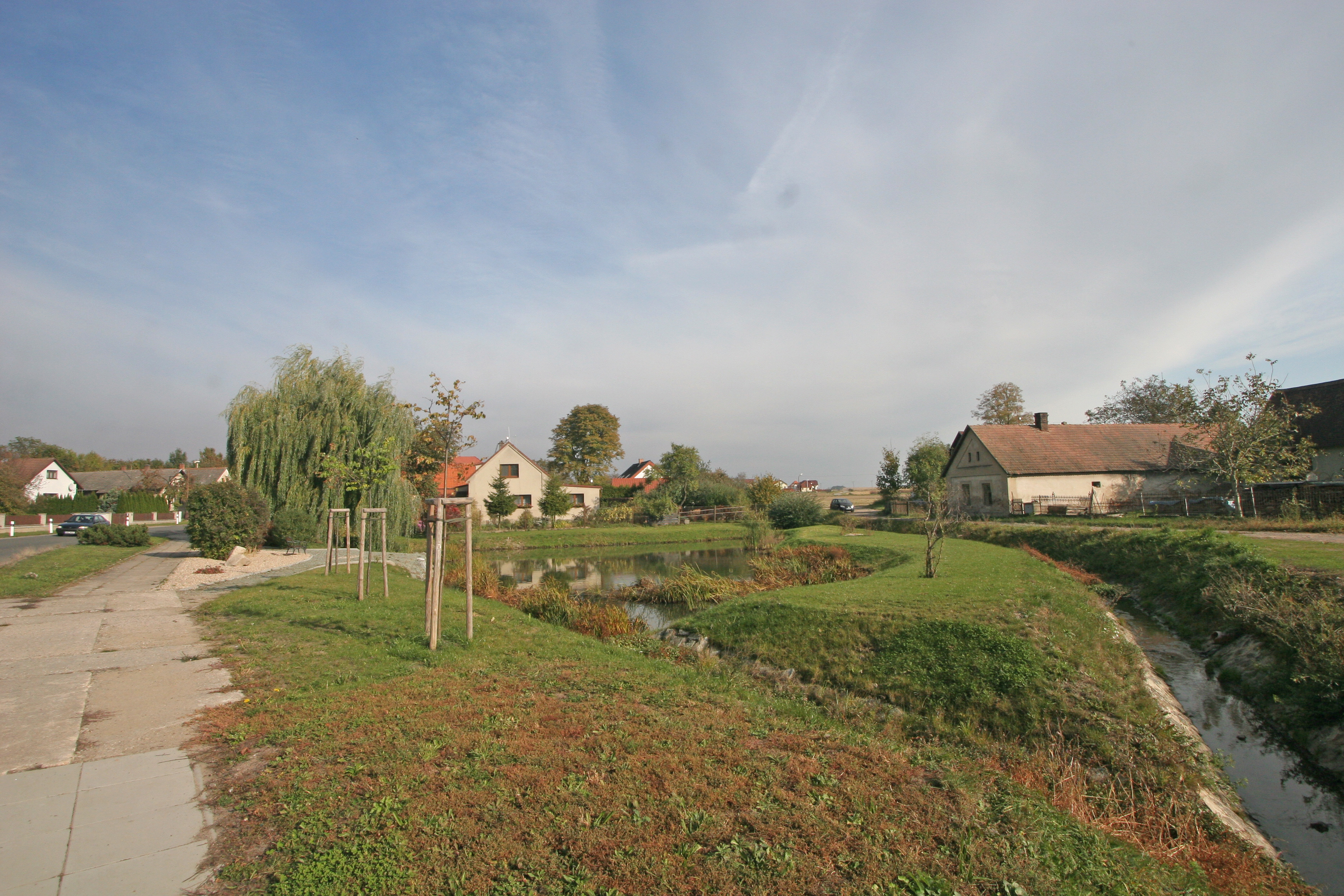
- A pond in the western part of Librantice

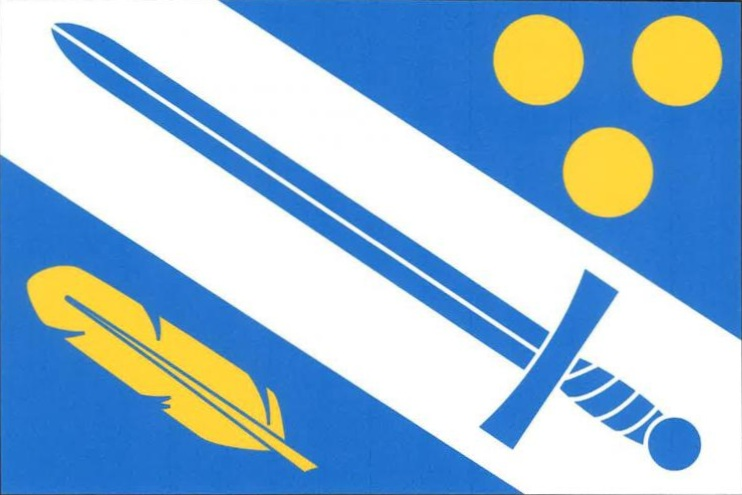
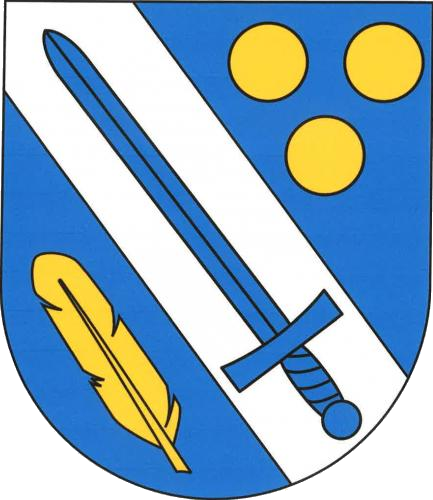
- Flag Coat of arms

- Location in the Czech Republic
- Coordinates: 50°10′9″N 15°36′25″E
- Country: Czech Republic
- Region: Hradec Králové
- District: Hradec Králové
- First mentioned: 1496

Area
  - Total: 6.52 km^{2} (2.52 sq mi)
- Elevation: 262 m (860 ft)

Population (2026-01-01)
  - Total: 685
  - Density: 105/km^{2} (272/sq mi)
- Time zone: UTC+1 (CET)
  - Summer (DST): UTC+2 (CEST)
- Postal code: 503 46
- Website: www.librantice.cz

Librantice is a municipality and village in Hradec Králové District in the Hradec Králové Region of the Czech Republic. It has about 700 inhabitants.

== History ==
The first written mention of Librantice is from 1496.

== Demographics ==
Historical population
Year	Pop.	±%
1869	656	—
1880	701	+6.9%
1890	680	−3.0%
1900	609	−10.4%
1910	653	+7.2%
1921	675	+3.4%
1930	595	−11.9%
1950	455	−23.5%
1961	459	+0.9%
1970	399	−13.1%
1980	332	−16.8%
1991	361	+8.7%
2001	417	+15.5%
2011	482	+15.6%
2021	555	+15.1%
Source: Censuses
