= Libníkovice =

- Municipality
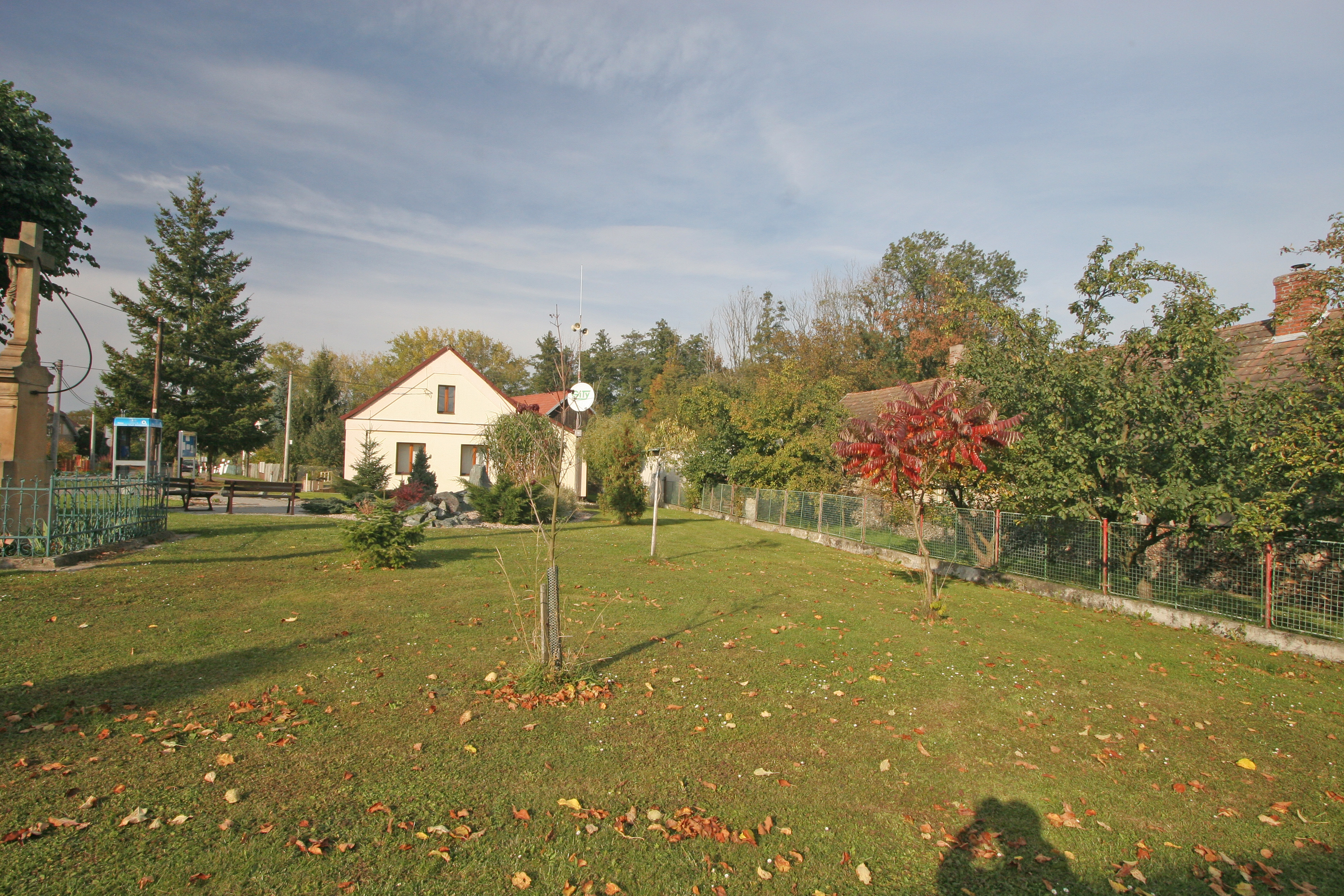
- Municipal office

- Flag Coat of arms

- Location in the Czech Republic
- Coordinates: 50°14′39″N 15°59′46″E
- Country: Czech Republic
- Region: Hradec Králové
- District: Hradec Králové
- First mentioned: 1546

Area
  - Total: 3.21 km^{2} (1.24 sq mi)
- Elevation: 278 m (912 ft)

Population (2026-01-01)
  - Total: 186
  - Density: 57.9/km^{2} (150/sq mi)
- Time zone: UTC+1 (CET)
  - Summer (DST): UTC+2 (CEST)
- Postal code: 503 46
- Website: www.libnikovice.cz

Libníkovice is a municipality and village in Hradec Králové District in the Hradec Králové Region of the Czech Republic. It has about 200 inhabitants.

== Administrative division ==
Libníkovice consists of three municipal parts (in brackets population according to the 2021 census):

- Libníkovice (113)
- Borovice (28)
- Horní Černilov (28)

== Demographics ==
Historical population
Year	Pop.	±%
1869	290	—
1880	293	+1.0%
1890	301	+2.7%
1900	279	−7.3%
1910	279	+0.0%
1921	282	+1.1%
1930	271	−3.9%
1950	196	−27.7%
1961	189	−3.6%
1970	169	−10.6%
1980	147	−13.0%
1991	131	−10.9%
2001	128	−2.3%
2011	156	+21.9%
2021	169	+8.3%
Source: Censuses
