= Stará Voda (Hradec Králové District) =

- Municipality
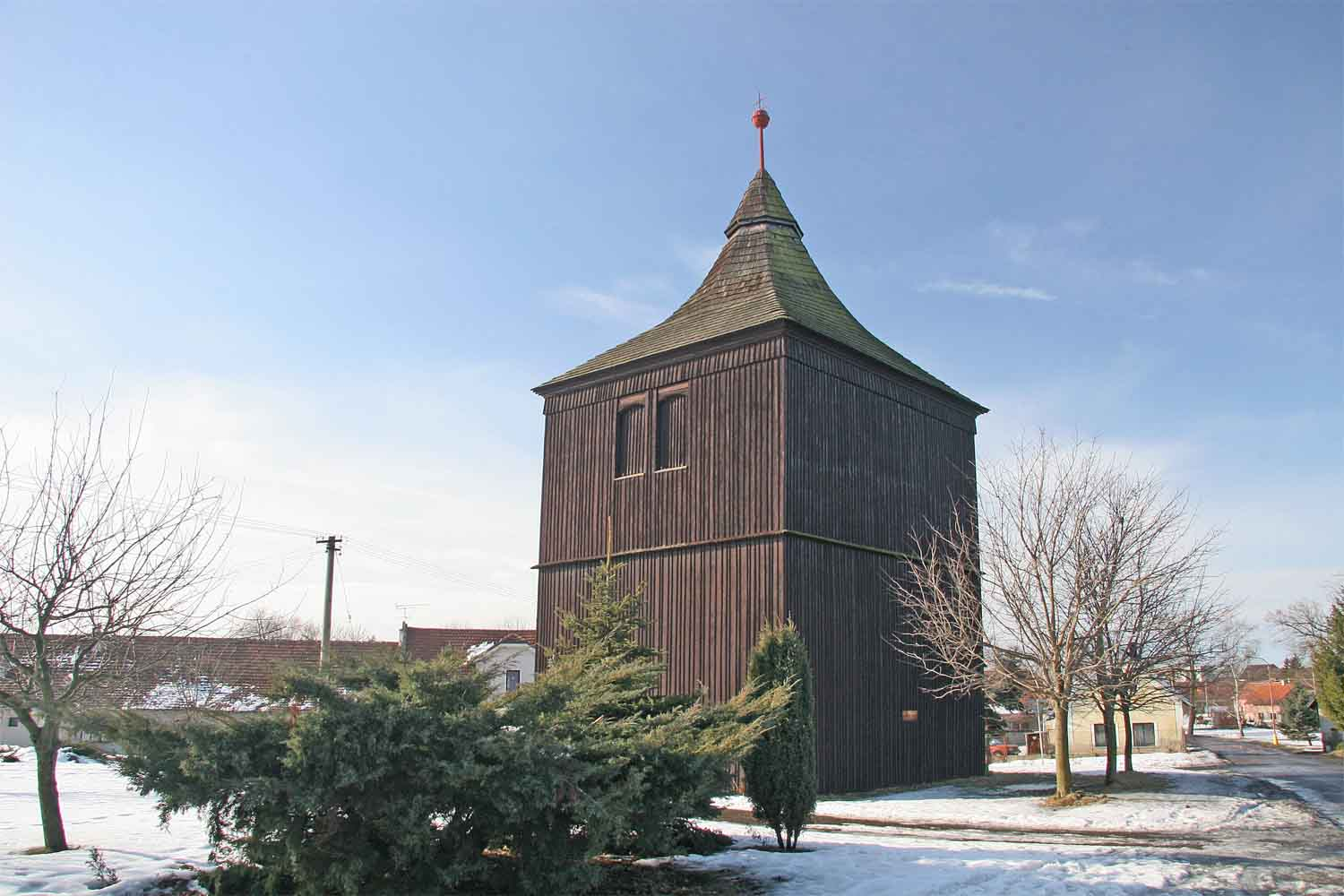
- Wooden belfry

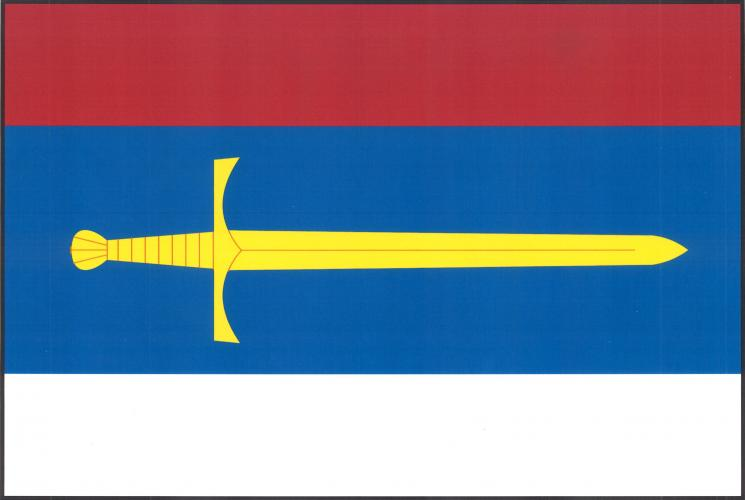
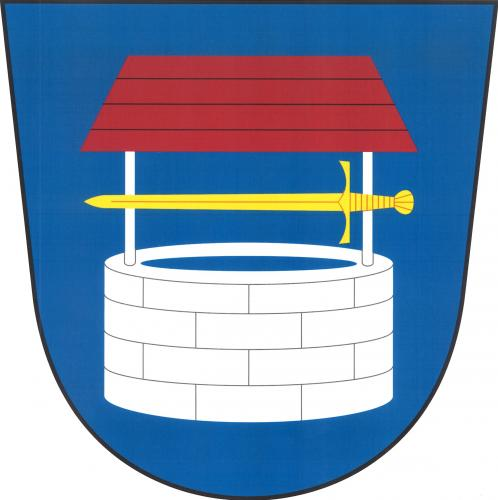
- Flag Coat of arms

- Location in the Czech Republic
- Coordinates: 50°9′1″N 15°31′50″E
- Country: Czech Republic
- Region: Hradec Králové
- District: Hradec Králové
- First mentioned: 1369

Area
  - Total: 3.42 km^{2} (1.32 sq mi)
- Elevation: 228 m (748 ft)

Population (2026-01-01)
  - Total: 145
  - Density: 42.4/km^{2} (110/sq mi)
- Time zone: UTC+1 (CET)
  - Summer (DST): UTC+2 (CEST)
- Postal code: 503 66
- Website: www.staravodahk.cz

Stará Voda is a municipality and village in Hradec Králové District in the Hradec Králové Region of the Czech Republic. It has about 100 inhabitants.

== Demographics ==
Historical population
Year	Pop.	±%
1869	252	—
1880	296	+17.5%
1890	303	+2.4%
1900	322	+6.3%
1910	303	−5.9%
1921	285	−5.9%
1930	287	+0.7%
1950	209	−27.2%
1961	222	+6.2%
1970	170	−23.4%
1980	118	−30.6%
1991	111	−5.9%
2001	126	+13.5%
2011	128	+1.6%
2021	134	+4.7%
Source: Censuses
