= Střezetice =

- Municipality
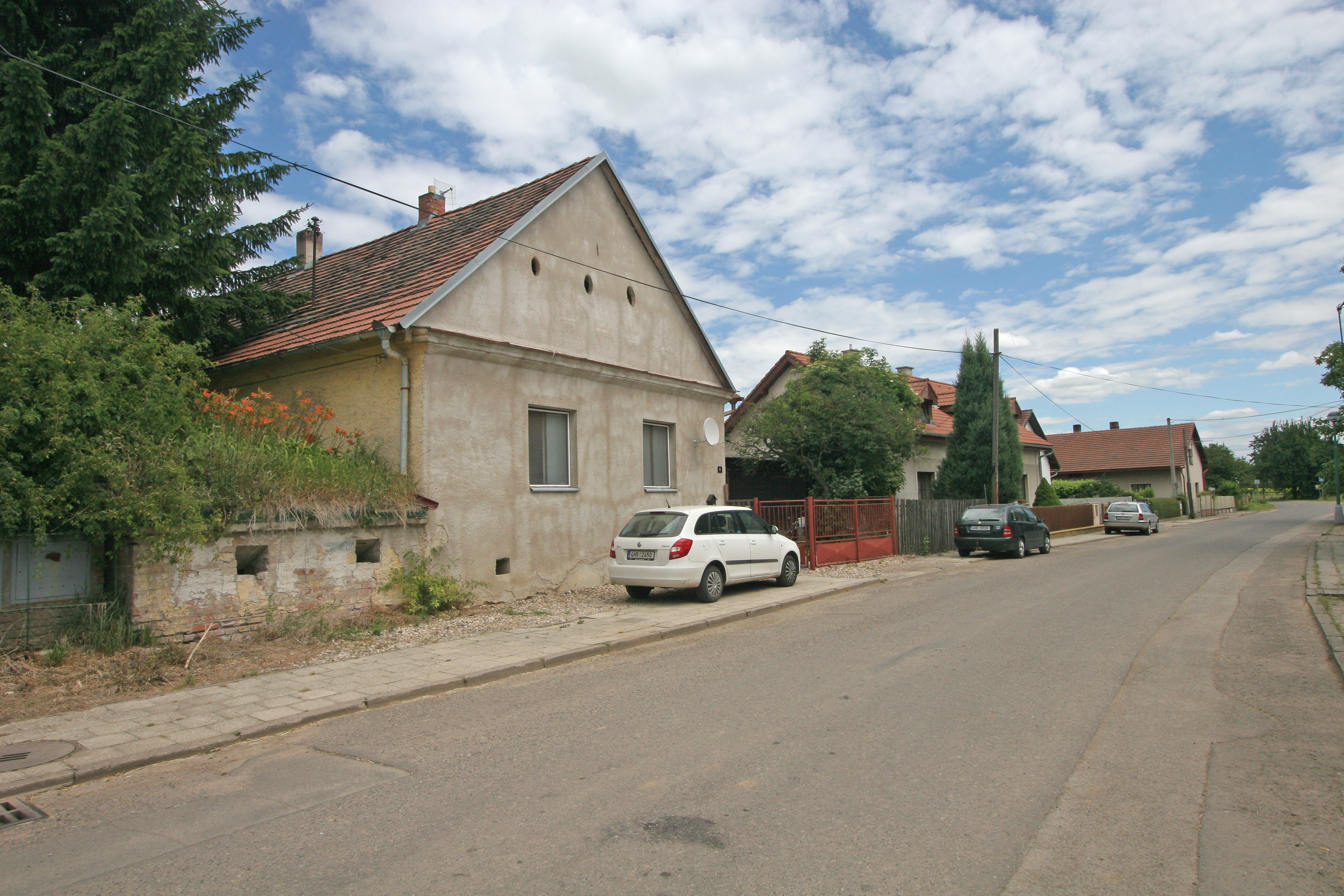
- Dlouhé Dvory, a part of Střezetice

- Flag Coat of arms

- Location in the Czech Republic
- Coordinates: 50°15′30″N 15°43′6″E
- Country: Czech Republic
- Region: Hradec Králové
- District: Hradec Králové
- First mentioned: 1351

Area
  - Total: 4.82 km^{2} (1.86 sq mi)
- Elevation: 271 m (889 ft)

Population (2026-01-01)
  - Total: 368
  - Density: 76.3/km^{2} (198/sq mi)
- Time zone: UTC+1 (CET)
  - Summer (DST): UTC+2 (CEST)
- Postal code: 503 12
- Website: www.strezetice.cz

Střezetice is a municipality and village in Hradec Králové District in the Hradec Králové Region of the Czech Republic. It has about 400 inhabitants.

== Administrative division ==
Střezetice consists of two municipal parts (in brackets population according to the 2021 census):

- Střezetice (269)
- Dlouhé Dvory (99)

== Demographics ==
Historical population
| Year | Pop. | ±% |
|---|---|---|
| 1869 | 463 | — |
| 1880 | 422 | −8.9% |
| 1890 | 428 | +1.4% |
| 1900 | 405 | −5.4% |
| 1910 | 389 | −4.0% |
| 1921 | 376 | −3.3% |
| 1930 | 414 | +10.1% |
| 1950 | 357 | −13.8% |
| 1961 | 347 | −2.8% |
| 1970 | 337 | −2.9% |
| 1980 | 320 | −5.0% |
| 1991 | 309 | −3.4% |
| 2001 | 308 | −0.3% |
| 2011 | 363 | +17.9% |
| 2021 | 368 | +1.4% |
Source: Censuses
