= Máslojedy =

- Municipality
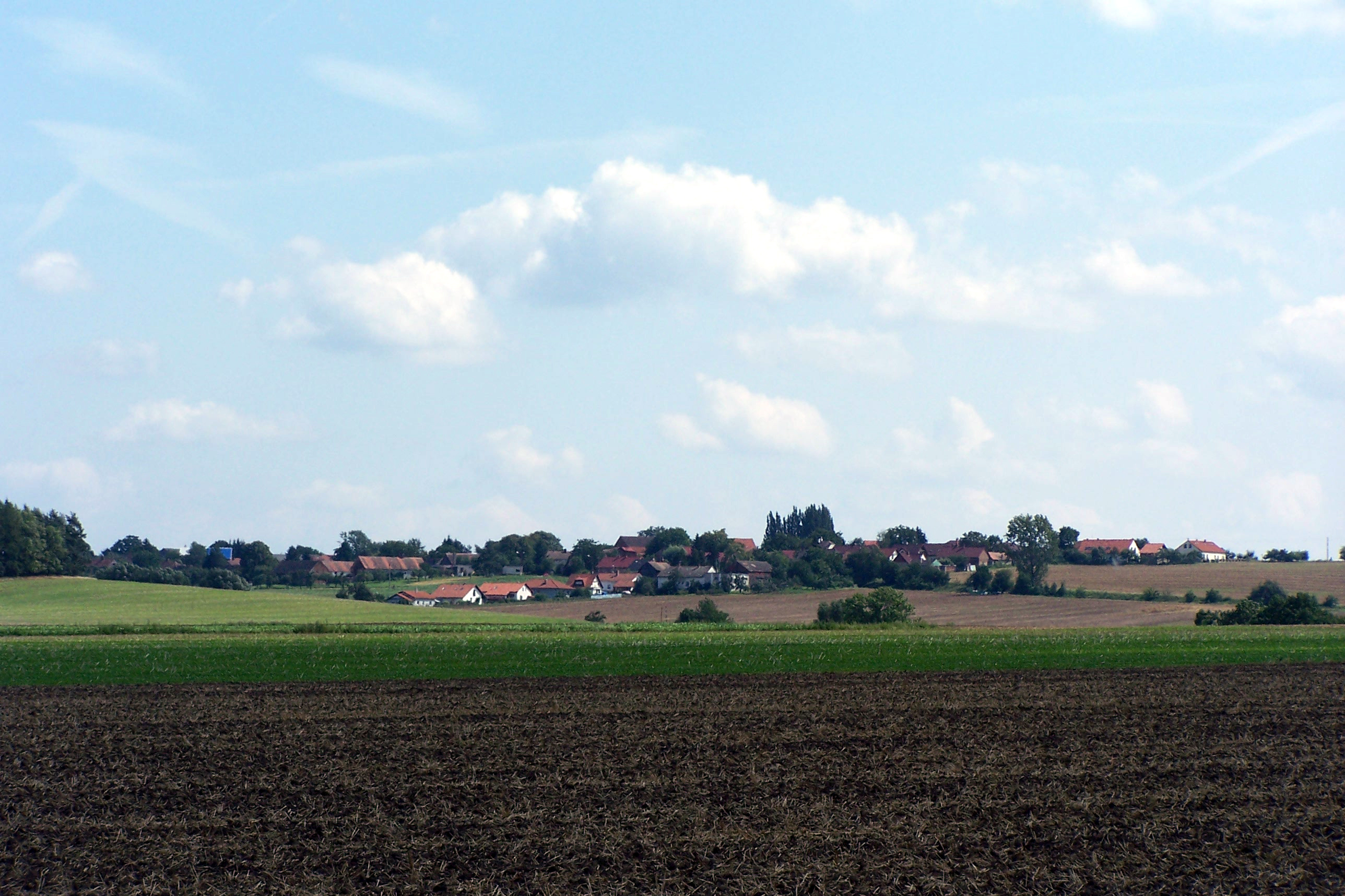
- View from the north

- Flag Coat of arms

- Location in the Czech Republic
- Coordinates: 50°17′49″N 15°45′32″E
- Country: Czech Republic
- Region: Hradec Králové
- District: Hradec Králové
- First mentioned: 1241

Area
  - Total: 4.61 km^{2} (1.78 sq mi)
- Elevation: 321 m (1,053 ft)

Population (2026-01-01)
  - Total: 218
  - Density: 47.3/km^{2} (122/sq mi)
- Time zone: UTC+1 (CET)
  - Summer (DST): UTC+2 (CEST)
- Postal code: 503 03
- Website: www.maslojedy.cz

Máslojedy is a municipality and village in Hradec Králové District in the Hradec Králové Region of the Czech Republic. It has about 200 inhabitants.

== Demographics ==
Historical population
Year	Pop.	±%
1869	426	—
1880	405	−4.9%
1890	345	−14.8%
1900	308	−10.7%
1910	316	+2.6%
1921	307	−2.8%
1930	347	+13.0%
1950	230	−33.7%
1961	223	−3.0%
1970	199	−10.8%
1980	179	−10.1%
1991	122	−31.8%
2001	149	+22.1%
2011	209	+40.3%
2021	205	−1.9%
Source: Censuses
