= Prasek =

- Municipality
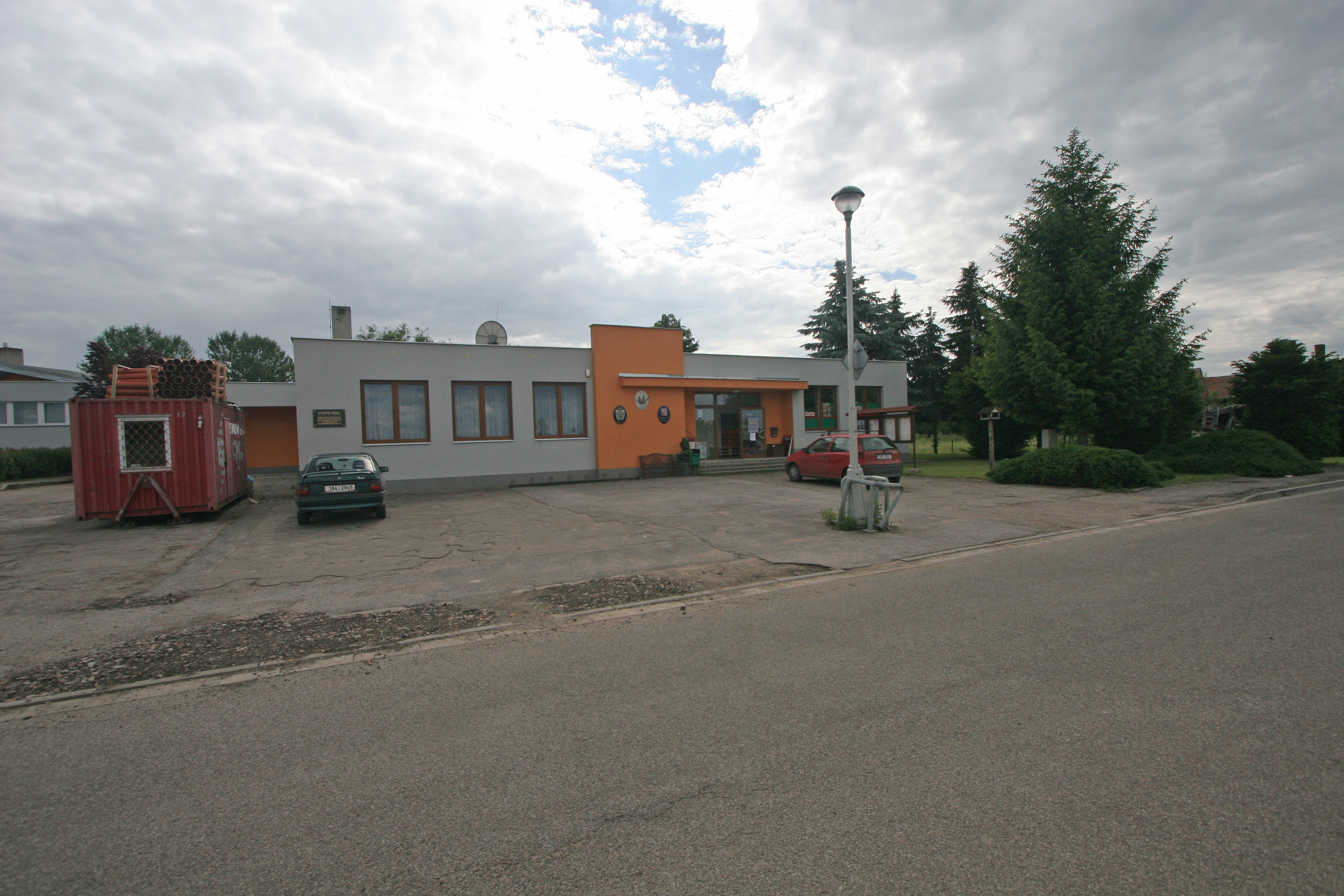
- Municipal office

- Flag Coat of arms

- Location in the Czech Republic
- Coordinates: 50°14′19″N 15°32′55″E
- Country: Czech Republic
- Region: Hradec Králové
- District: Hradec Králové
- First mentioned: 1312

Area
  - Total: 6.27 km^{2} (2.42 sq mi)
- Elevation: 245 m (804 ft)

Population (2026-01-01)
  - Total: 645
  - Density: 103/km^{2} (266/sq mi)
- Time zone: UTC+1 (CET)
  - Summer (DST): UTC+2 (CEST)
- Postal code: 504 01
- Website: www.prasek.cz

Prasek is a municipality and village in Hradec Králové District in the Hradec Králové Region of the Czech Republic. It has about 600 inhabitants.

== Demographics ==
Historical population
Year	Pop.	±%
1869	995	—
1880	1,057	+6.2%
1890	1,076	+1.8%
1900	1,125	+4.6%
1910	1,048	−6.8%
1921	1,008	−3.8%
1930	908	−9.9%
1950	687	−24.3%
1961	639	−7.0%
1970	605	−5.3%
1980	568	−6.1%
1991	553	−2.6%
2001	562	+1.6%
2011	600	+6.8%
2021	606	+1.0%
Source: Censuses
