= Myštěves =

- Municipality
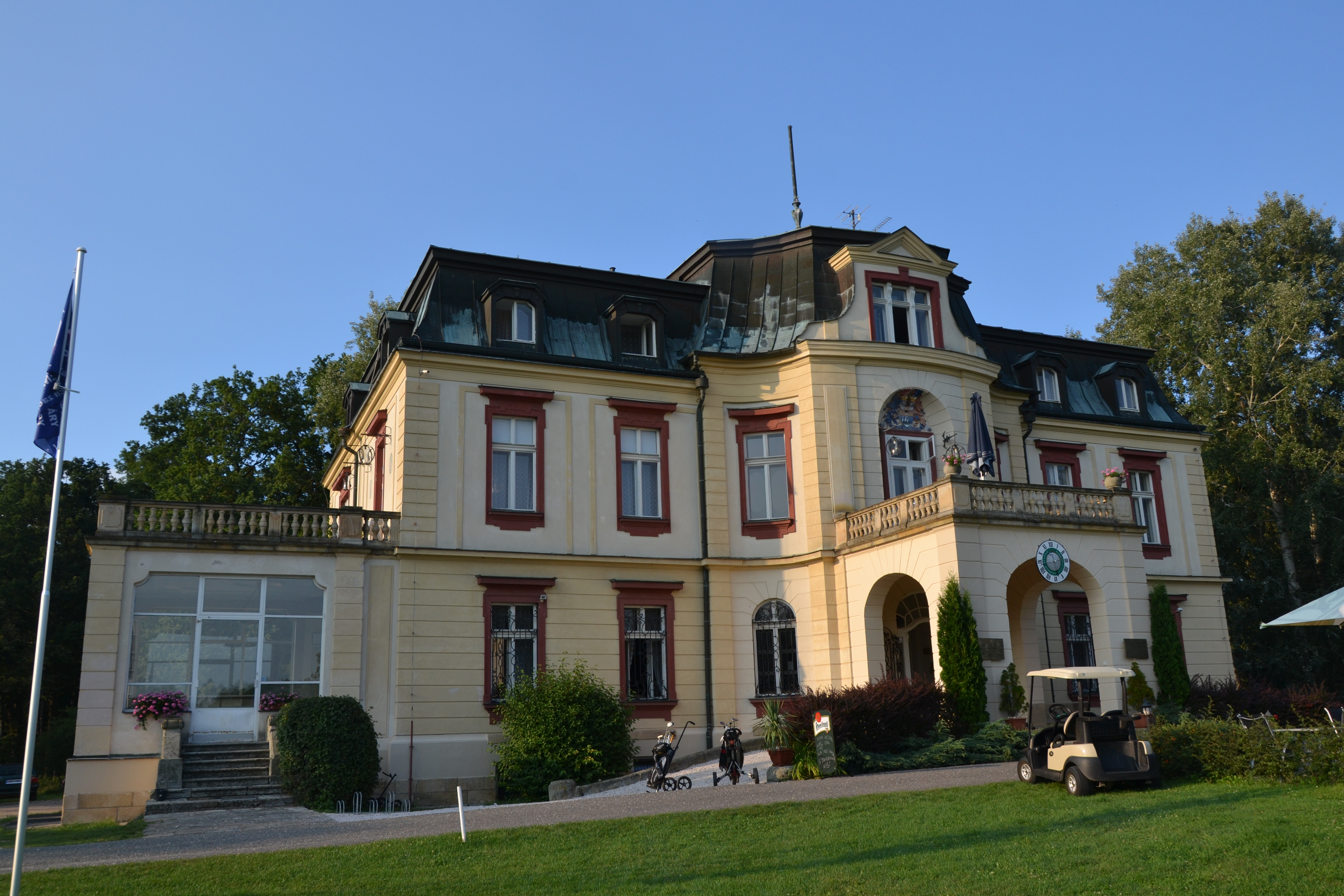
- Blažkov Castle

- Location in the Czech Republic
- Coordinates: 50°17′52″N 15°33′27″E
- Country: Czech Republic
- Region: Hradec Králové
- District: Hradec Králové
- First mentioned: 1365

Area
  - Total: 5.72 km^{2} (2.21 sq mi)
- Elevation: 260 m (850 ft)

Population (2026-01-01)
  - Total: 219
  - Density: 38.3/km^{2} (99.2/sq mi)
- Time zone: UTC+1 (CET)
  - Summer (DST): UTC+2 (CEST)
- Postal code: 503 15
- Website: www.mysteves.cz

Myštěves is a municipality and village in Hradec Králové District in the Hradec Králové Region of the Czech Republic. It has about 200 inhabitants.

== Demographics ==
Historical population
Year	Pop.	±%
1869	560	—
1880	626	+11.8%
1890	646	+3.2%
1900	663	+2.6%
1910	656	−1.1%
1921	583	−11.1%
1930	590	+1.2%
1950	346	−41.4%
1961	301	−13.0%
1970	248	−17.6%
1980	225	−9.3%
1991	180	−20.0%
2001	180	+0.0%
2011	185	+2.8%
2021	174	−5.9%
Source: Censuses
