= Vrchovnice =

- Municipality
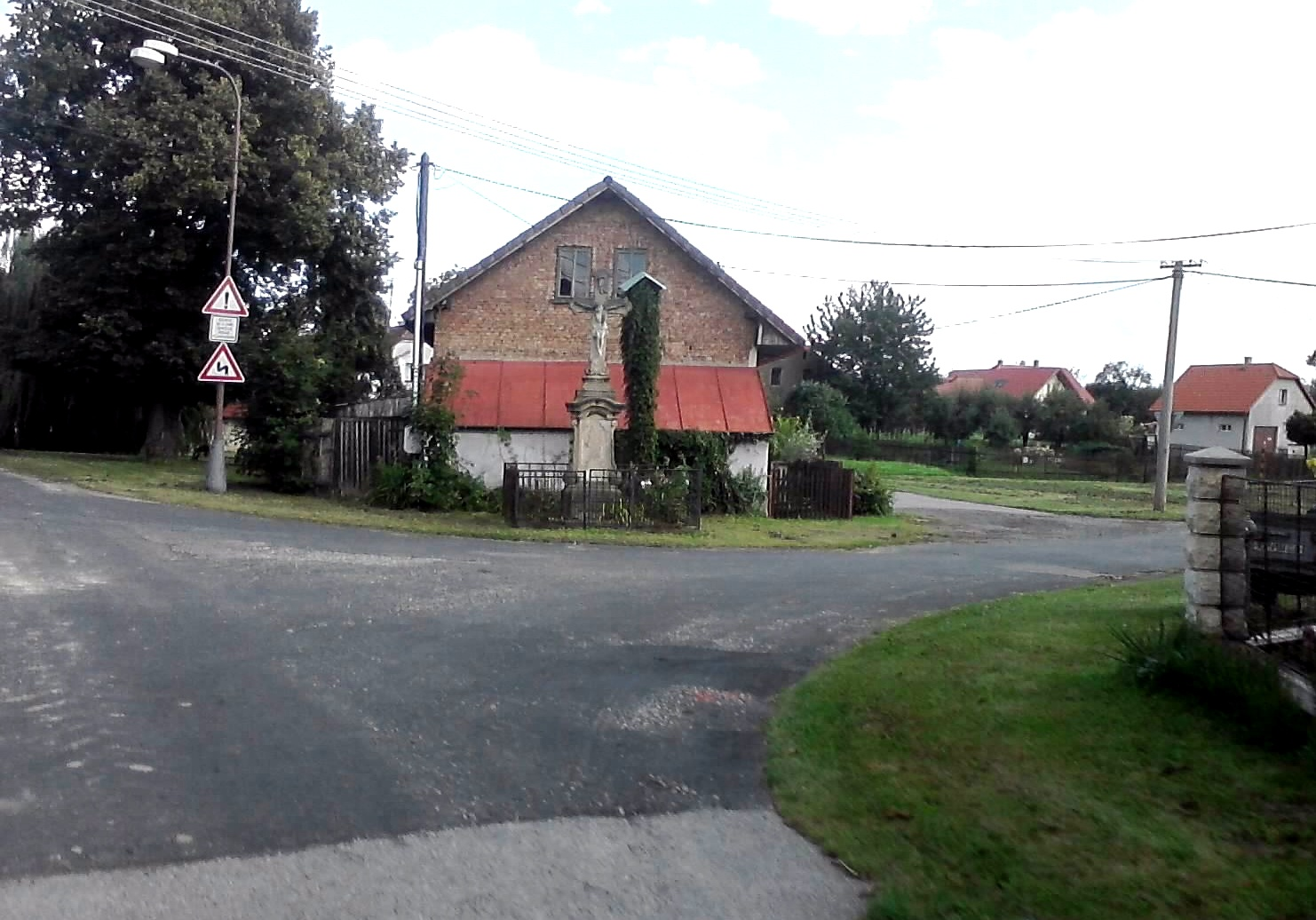
- Centre of Vrchovnice

- Location in the Czech Republic
- Coordinates: 50°19′23″N 15°45′27″E
- Country: Czech Republic
- Region: Hradec Králové
- District: Hradec Králové
- First mentioned: 1355

Area
  - Total: 1.51 km^{2} (0.58 sq mi)
- Elevation: 281 m (922 ft)

Population (2026-01-01)
  - Total: 90
  - Density: 60/km^{2} (150/sq mi)
- Time zone: UTC+1 (CET)
  - Summer (DST): UTC+2 (CEST)
- Postal code: 503 03
- Website: vrchovnice.cz

Vrchovnice is a municipality and village in Hradec Králové District in the Hradec Králové Region of the Czech Republic. It has about 90 inhabitants.

== Demographics ==
Historical population
Year	Pop.	±%
1869	136	—
1880	161	+18.4%
1890	147	−8.7%
1900	127	−13.6%
1910	163	+28.3%
1921	142	−12.9%
1930	132	−7.0%
1950	97	−26.5%
1961	90	−7.2%
1970	87	−3.3%
1980	72	−17.2%
1991	65	−9.7%
2001	68	+4.6%
2011	66	−2.9%
2021	63	−4.5%
Source: Censuses
