= Zachrašťany =

- Municipality
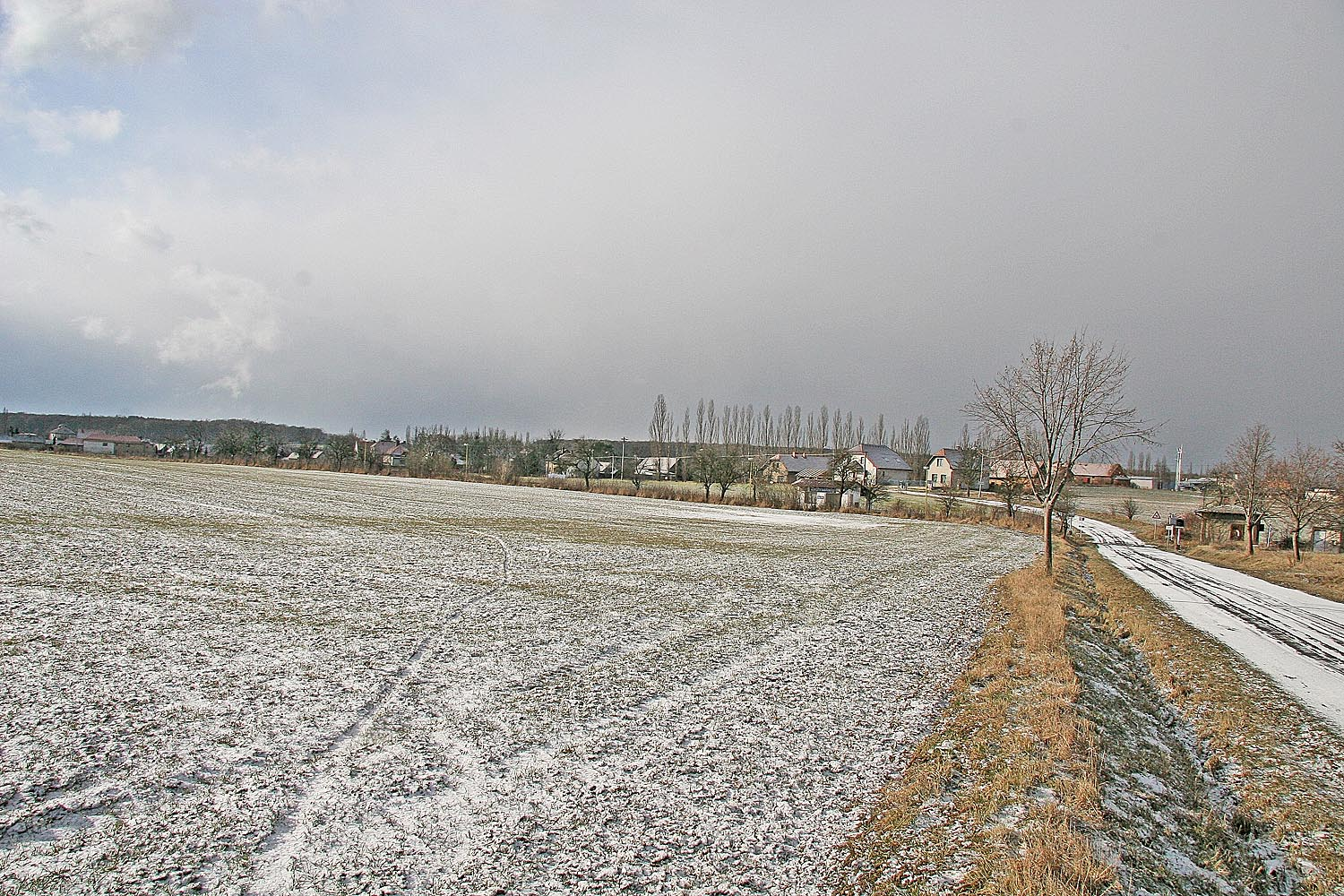
- View from the northeast

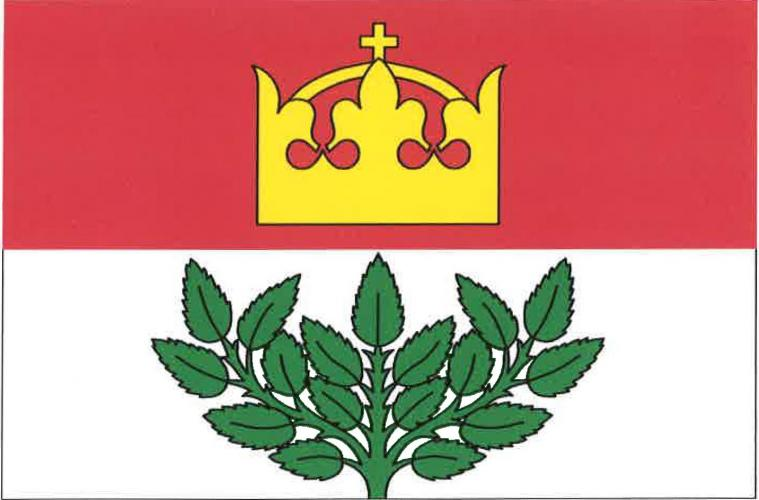
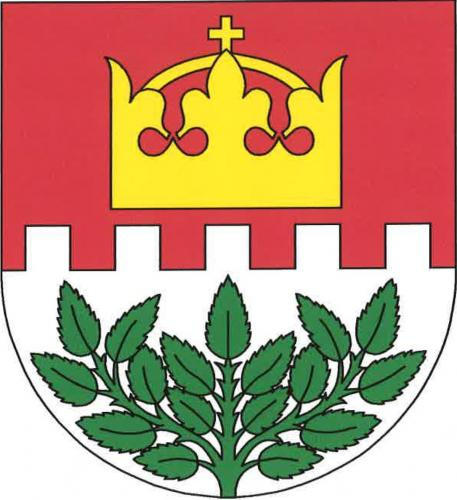
- Flag Coat of arms

- Location in the Czech Republic
- Coordinates: 50°12′40″N 15°28′59″E
- Country: Czech Republic
- Region: Hradec Králové
- District: Hradec Králové
- First mentioned: 1297

Area
  - Total: 4.39 km^{2} (1.69 sq mi)
- Elevation: 232 m (761 ft)

Population (2026-01-01)
  - Total: 260
  - Density: 59/km^{2} (150/sq mi)
- Time zone: UTC+1 (CET)
  - Summer (DST): UTC+2 (CEST)
- Postal code: 504 01
- Website: www.zachrastany.cz

Zachrašťany is a municipality and village in Hradec Králové District in the Hradec Králové Region of the Czech Republic. It has about 300 inhabitants.

== Demographics ==
Historical population
Year	Pop.	±%
1869	340	—
1880	409	+20.3%
1890	418	+2.2%
1900	413	−1.2%
1910	549	+32.9%
1921	565	+2.9%
1930	471	−16.6%
1950	417	−11.5%
1961	373	−10.6%
1970	286	−23.3%
1980	234	−18.2%
1991	204	−12.8%
2001	178	−12.7%
2011	185	+3.9%
2021	245	+32.4%
Source: Censuses
