= Sendražice =

- Municipality
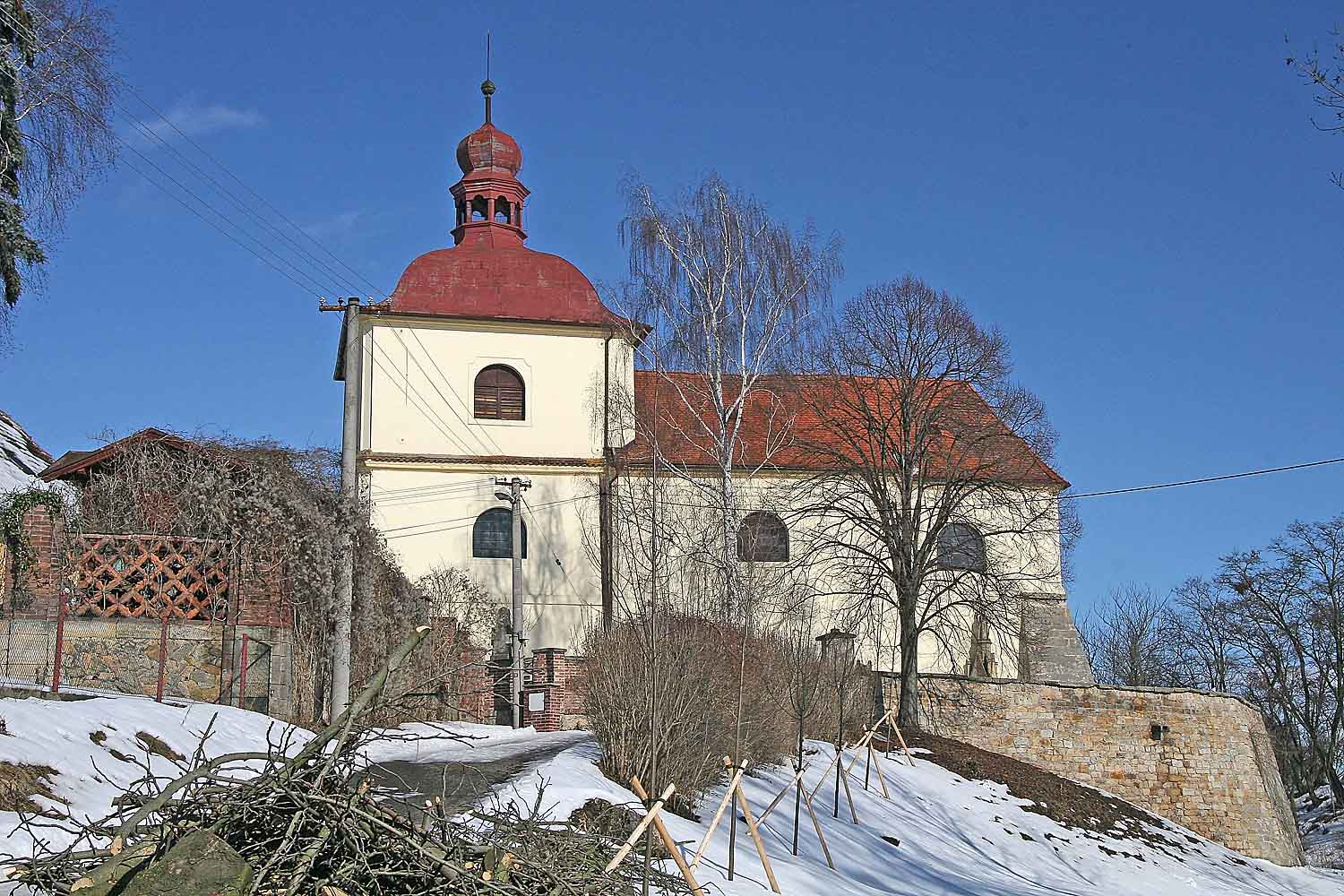
- Church of Saint Stanislaus

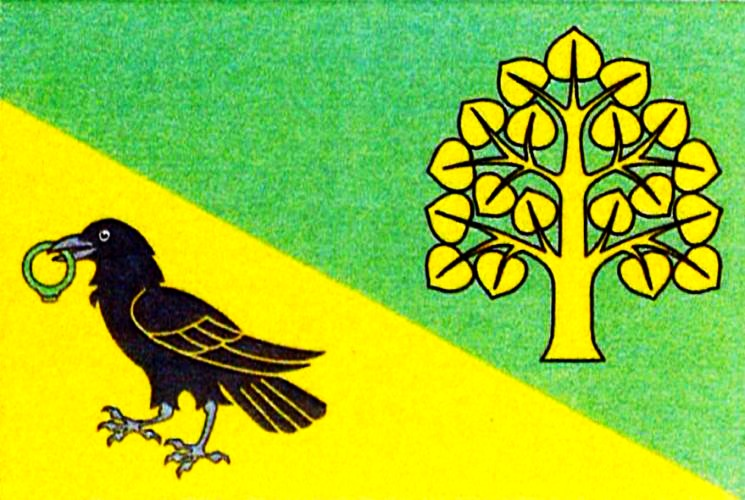
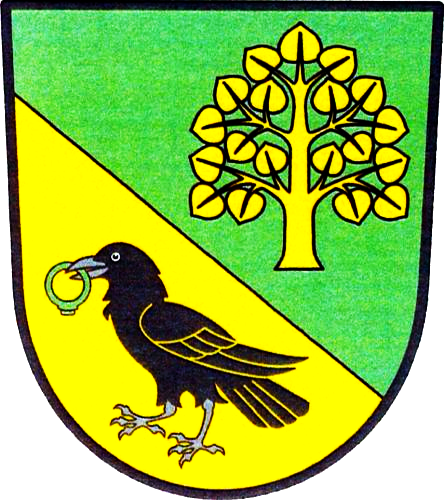
- Flag Coat of arms

- Location in the Czech Republic
- Coordinates: 50°17′24″N 15°47′46″E
- Country: Czech Republic
- Region: Hradec Králové
- District: Hradec Králové
- First mentioned: 1297

Area
  - Total: 5.01 km^{2} (1.93 sq mi)
- Elevation: 263 m (863 ft)

Population (2026-01-01)
  - Total: 434
  - Density: 86.6/km^{2} (224/sq mi)
- Time zone: UTC+1 (CET)
  - Summer (DST): UTC+2 (CEST)
- Postal code: 503 03
- Website: www.sendrazice.cz

Sendražice is a municipality and village in Hradec Králové District in the Hradec Králové Region of the Czech Republic. It has about 400 inhabitants.

== Demographics ==
Historical population
Year	Pop.	±%
1869	665	—
1880	629	−5.4%
1890	683	+8.6%
1900	632	−7.5%
1910	622	−1.6%
1921	587	−5.6%
1930	578	−1.5%
1950	376	−34.9%
1961	367	−2.4%
1970	329	−10.4%
1980	318	−3.3%
1991	304	−4.4%
2001	301	−1.0%
2011	425	+41.2%
2021	415	−2.4%
Source: Censuses

== Sights ==
The main landmark of Sendražice is the Church of Saint Stanislaus. It has a Gothic core from the 14th century. It was rebuilt into its present Baroque form in the early 18th century.
