= Ohnišťany =

- Municipality
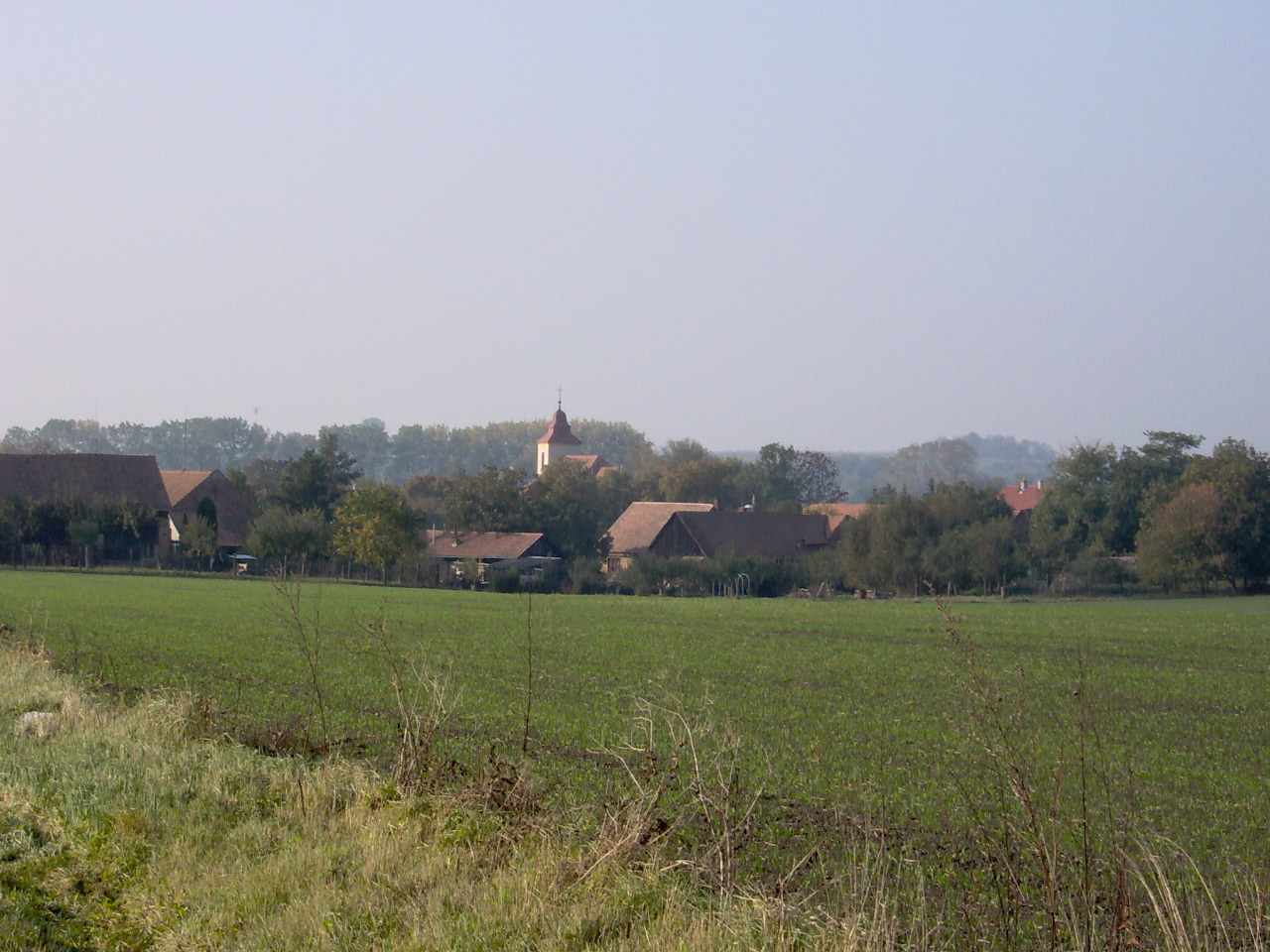
- View towards the Church of Saint Wenceslaus

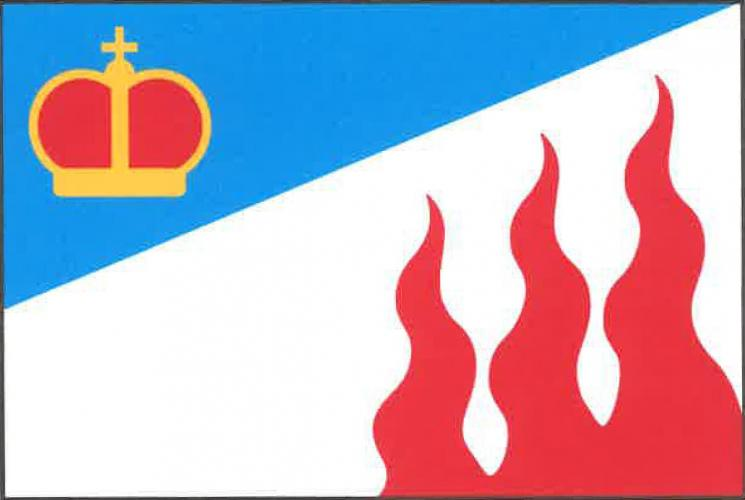
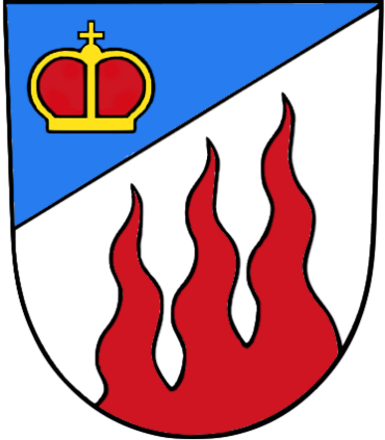
- Flag Coat of arms

- Location in the Czech Republic
- Coordinates: 50°19′46″N 15°30′40″E
- Country: Czech Republic
- Region: Hradec Králové
- District: Hradec Králové
- First mentioned: 1318

Area
  - Total: 8.82 km^{2} (3.41 sq mi)
- Elevation: 246 m (807 ft)

Population (2026-01-01)
  - Total: 344
  - Density: 39.0/km^{2} (101/sq mi)
- Time zone: UTC+1 (CET)
  - Summer (DST): UTC+2 (CEST)
- Postal code: 503 54
- Website: www.ohnistany.cz

Ohnišťany is a municipality and village in Hradec Králové District in the Hradec Králové Region of the Czech Republic. It has about 300 inhabitants.

== Demographics ==
Historical population
Year	Pop.	±%
1869	815	—
1880	802	−1.6%
1890	745	−7.1%
1900	723	−3.0%
1910	736	+1.8%
1921	696	−5.4%
1930	661	−5.0%
1950	451	−31.8%
1961	508	+12.6%
1970	450	−11.4%
1980	407	−9.6%
1991	335	−17.7%
2001	330	−1.5%
2011	292	−11.5%
2021	329	+12.7%
Source: Censuses
