= Battle of Chlumec nad Cidlinou =

- Part of the peasant revolt of 1775 in Bohemia
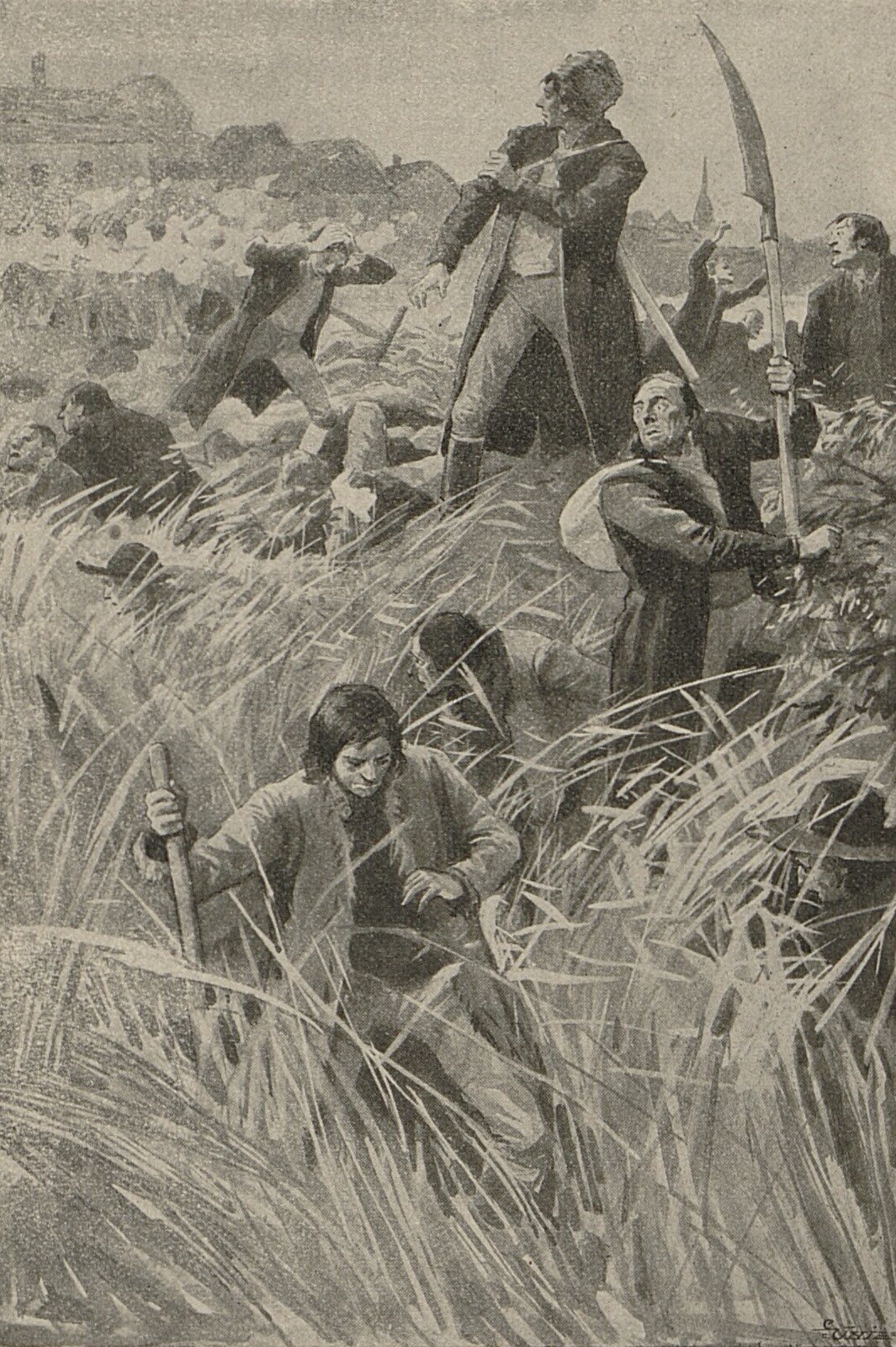
- Retreat of peasants during the Battle of Chlumec nad Cidlinou (book illustration by Stanislav Hudeček, 1915)
Date	25 and 26 March 1775
Location	Chlumec nad Cidlinou and Karlova Koruna Chateau, Kingdom of Bohemia
Result	Austrian victory

Belligerents
(Holy Roman Empire) Habsburg monarchy (Bohemia) Czech nobility	(Bohemia) Czech peasants

Commanders and leaders
(Holy Roman Empire) Unknown	(Bohemia) Matěj Chára (Bohemia) Matěj Chvojka

Strength
c. 100 soldiers	c. 500–1,000 rebels

Casualties and losses
2	c. 30 killed tens of wounded c. 300 captured

Battle of Chlumec nad Cidlinou was a final military engagement between Austrian army and Czech peasant rebels during the peasant revolt of 1775 in Bohemia at 25 and 26 March 1775. Peasants fighting for better conditions of their serf duties of corvée were crushed near the town of Chlumec nad Cidlinou and pushed to the Chlumec pond.

== Prelude ==
The uprising broke out as a result of the economic situation of the Habsburg monarchy, ruled by empress Maria Theresa, after the Seven Years' War and the great famine in Bohemia between 1770 and 1772. The villagers were also forced to work because of the law of corvée. At the beginning of 1775, riots began to rise in the border areas of the empire, in Teplice, Broumov and Náchod regions, which gradually spread to the entire hinterland of Bohemian border hills. The uprising arose especially at those mountainous and foothill areas, where the situation was the most dire after the famine.

In February 1775, a peasant "guberno" began to operate in Náchod region under the leadership of Antonín Nývlt, a free magistrate of the village of Rtyně v Podkrkonoší. On 20 March 1775, peasant riots broke out in Náchod and Chlumec nad Cidlinou regions, the noblemen's offices and mansions were demolished, when peasants and peasants forced the abolition of the corvée. This was mainly fueled by a rumor that there is an imperial patent on the abolition of corvée, which the authorities are hiding from their subjects. In the first days, the uprising gained quite considerable support in the rural areas of the wide Polabí area. On 24 March, a delegation of several heads was sent to Prague, where they wanted to discuss the demands, but were stopped by the army in front of the city gates.

== Battle ==
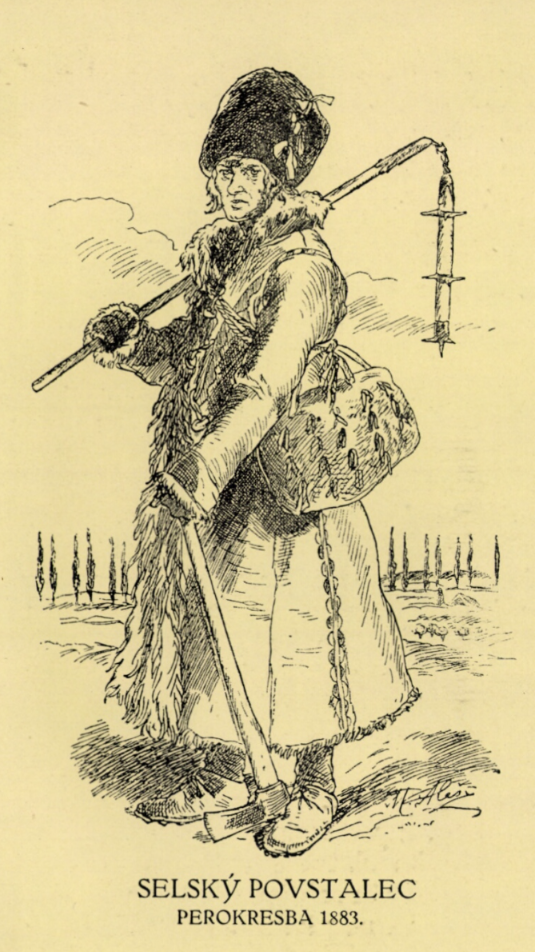
Mikoláš Aleš: Peasant warrior (drawing, 1883)

On 25 March a crowd of about 500–1,000 impromptu armed (scythes adapted to a slashing weapons) peasants arrived at Karlova Koruna Chateau near Chlumec nad Cidlinou, who belonged to the Kinsky family. Their spokesperson was Matěj Chára, the magistrate in Obědovice, one of the leaders was also Matěj Chvojka from Roudnice, known among the insurgents for his resemblance to the heir to the throne Joseph II. There were only 8 soldiers in the town at that moment, so the townspeople blocked the streets with barricades and prepared for an insurgent attack. The town was defended, as military reinforcements entered Chlumec at the last moment and repelled the attack of the rebels. Two peasants were killed on the battlefield, others were pushed into the Chlumecký Pond, where they drowned, and 74 were captured.

The following day, Sunday 26 March, the peasants attempted another attack with the intention of burning down the chateau. However, this turned out to be even worse than the attack of the previous day. As the Imperial troops opened fire and the first dead and wounded appeared, the peasants began to retreat and eventually fled. In this attack 5 men were killed, 3 drowned and 211 captured. About 16 more men died of wounds, while the Imperial Army lost two men. In the following days, rioters were arrested in the nearby villages.

== Aftermath ==
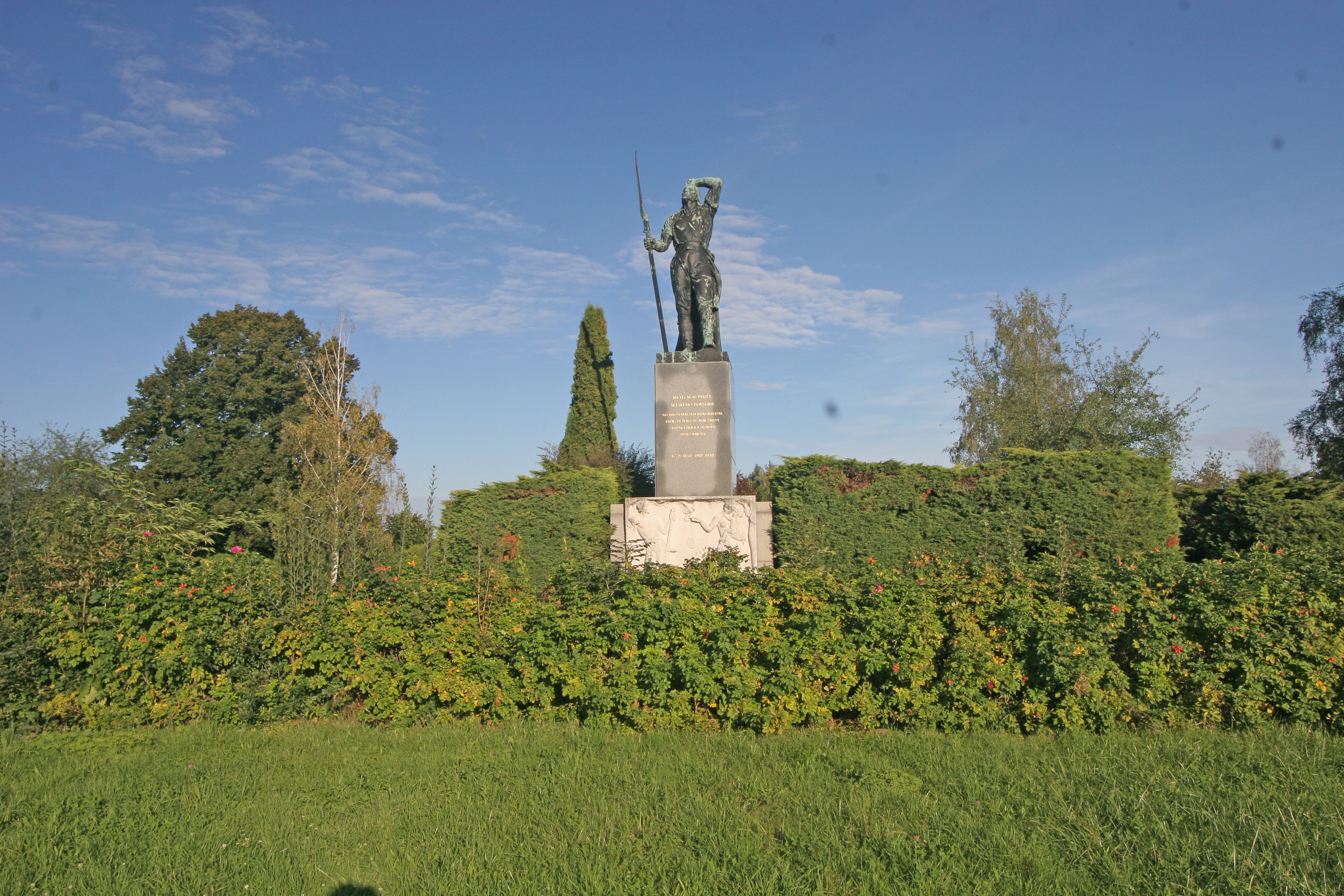
Jakub Obrovský: Peasant Riots Monument in Chlumec nad Cidlinou (1937)

The defeat of the insurgent crowd at Chlumec marked the de facto end of the peasant uprising in eastern Bohemia. The army began its advance from Chlumec to Rtyně, where the revolt leader Antonín Nývlt and a number of his comrades were captured without a fight. In the following days, he was transported to Hradec Králové and then to Prague, where he appeared in court with others on 3 April. On 9 April, Empress Maria Theresa pardoned the participants in the rebellion with a so-called general pardon with reduced sentences for the promise of loyalty. There were only seven exemplary executions for acts against church property and sacrilege.

Despite the defeat, the uprising contributed to speeding up the process that led to the publication of corvée patent in August 1775 and later Emperor Joseph II's patent for the abolition of serfdom in 1781.

== Legacy ==
In the town park in Chlumec nad Cidlinou, the Peasant Riots Monument by the sculptor Jakub Obrovský was erected in 1937 as a reminder of the revolt and the last battle of the revolt.

The defeat of the peasants in the battle gave rise to the Czech idiom saying "to end up like peasants near Chlumec".

== See also ==
- Peasant revolt of 1775 in Bohemia
