= Peasant revolt of 1775 in Bohemia =

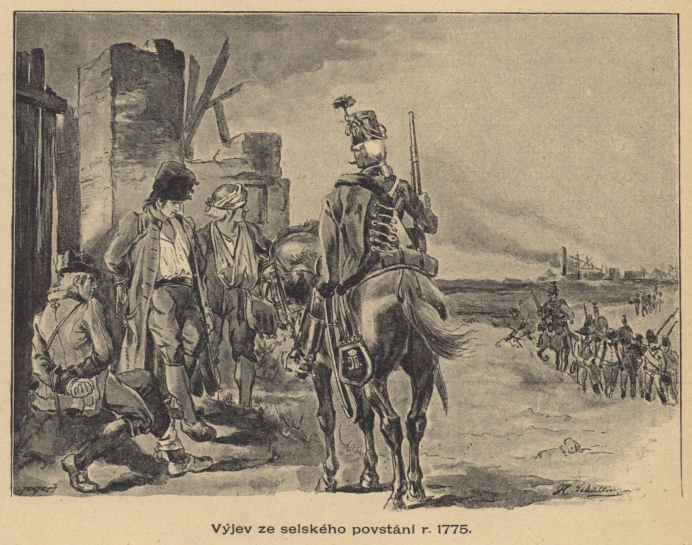
Hugo Schüllinger: Scene from peasant revolt of 1775 in Bohemia (illustration in Obrázkové dějiny národa českého, 1893)

The Peasants' Revolt of 1775 in Bohemia was a struggle of Czech peasants against the authorities of the Habsburg Empire with the aim of freeing themselves from the crushing labor and serf duties of corvée in the spring of 1775 in eastern Bohemia.

It is connected with the activities of the so-called "peasant governor" led by the magistrate Antonín Nývlt from Rtyně in Podkrkonoší, which united the rebellious subjects and gave them a common goal. The defeat of the uprising in the Battle of Chlumec nad Cidlinou from 25 to 26 March 1775 gave rise to the Czech idiom saying "to end up like peasants near Chlumec".

Later, Emperor Joseph II issued a patent for the abolition of serfdom in 1781.

== Prelude ==
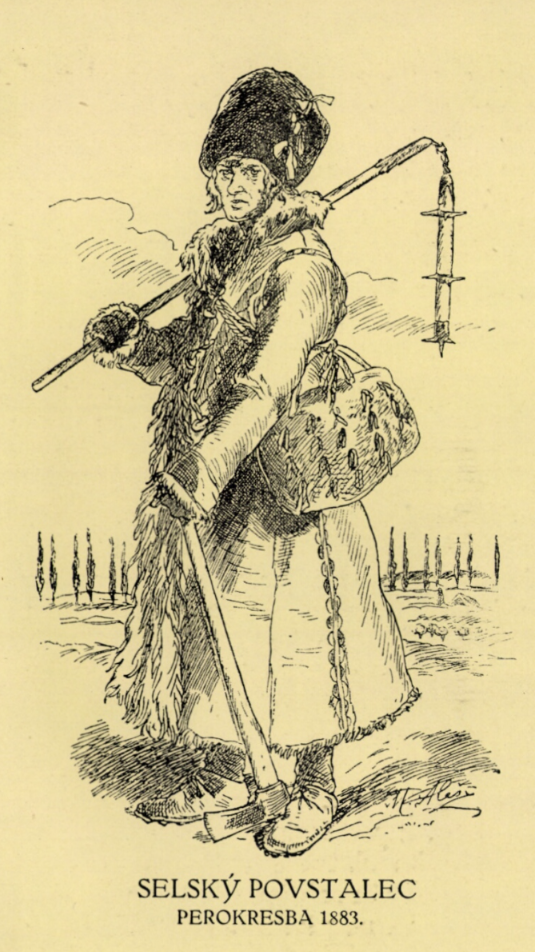
Mikoláš Aleš: Peasant warrior (drawing, 1883)

After the Seven Years' War, the economic situation of the empire ruled by empress Maria Theresa was greatly disheartened. Between 1770 and 1772, a famine broke out in the country, while the villagers were forced to work because of the law of corvée.

At the beginning of 1775, riots began to intensify in the border areas of the empire, in Teplice, Broumov and Náchod regions, which gradually spread to the entire hinterland of Bohemian border hills. The uprising arose especially at those mountainous and foothill areas, where the situation was the most dire after the famine.

== Revolt ==
In February 1775, a peasant "guberno" began to operate in Náchod region under the leadership of Antonín Nývlt, a free magistrate of the village of Rtyně in Podkrkonoší and householder who also became a negotiator with the authorities and, unlike other magistrates, moderated popular passions. The rural government issued an ordinance that modified the corvée rules and issued model schedules for the labour. It operated on nine estates and was considered the main instigator of the peasant uprising

On 20 March 1775, peasant riots broke out in Náchod and Chlumec nad Cidlinou regions, the noblemen's offices and mansions were demolished, when peasants and peasants forced the abolition of the corvée. This was mainly fueled by a rumor that there is an imperial patent on the abolition of corvée, which the Czech authorities were hiding from their subjects. In the first days, the uprising gained quite considerable support in the rural areas of the wide Polabí area (near Elbe river). On 24 March, a delegation of several heads was sent to Prague, where they wanted to discuss the demands, but were stopped by the army in front of the city gates.

The main armed clash occurred on 25 and 26 March, when about 500-1000 peasants, mostly equipped with improvised weapons, tried to storm chateau of Karlova Koruna in Chlumec nad Cidlinou. They were confronted by a group of a few hundred Austrian troops, who pushed them back. Some peasants were forced to run to the large pond placed nearby, causing several to be killed by drowning.

== Aftermath ==
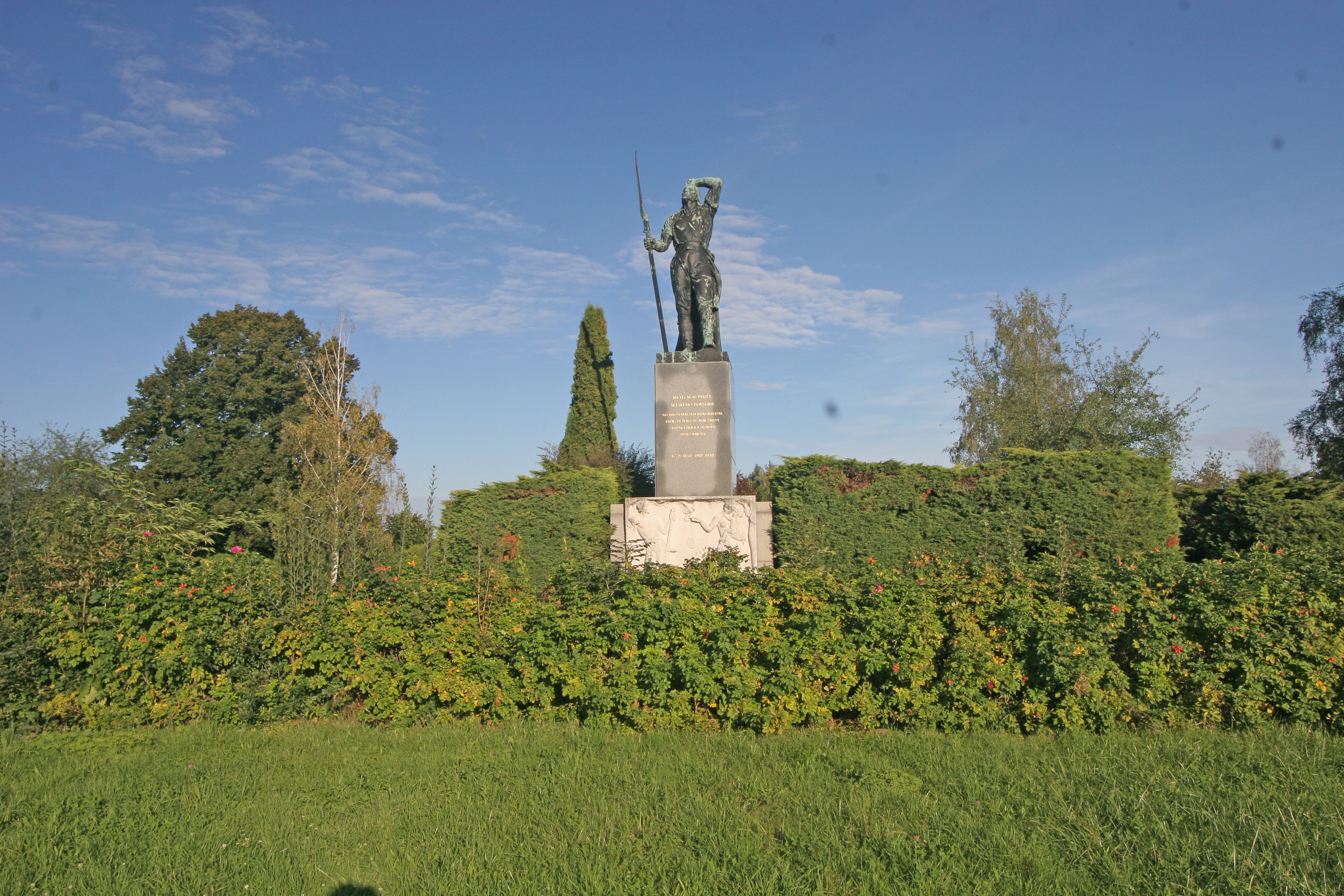
Jakub Obrovský: The Peasant Riots Monument in Chlumec nad Cidlinou (1937)

The defeat of the insurgent crowd at Chlumec marked the de facto end of the peasant uprising in eastern Bohemia. The army began its advance from Chlumec to Rtyně, where the revolt leader Antonín Nývlt and a number of his comrades were captured without a fight.

In the following days, he was transported to Hradec Králové and then to Prague, where he appeared in court with others on April 3. On April 9, Empress Maria Theresa pardoned the participants in the rebellion with a so-called general pardon with reduced sentences for the promise of loyalty. There were only seven exemplary executions for acts against church property and sacrilege. Despite the defeat, the uprising contributed to speeding up the process that led to the publication of corvée patent on 13 August 1775 in Bohemia and 7 September 1775 in Moravia.

In the city park in Chlumec nad Cidlinou The Peasant Riots Monument was erected in 1937, as a reminder of the revolt and the last battle of the revolt, by the sculptor Jakub Obrovský. Memorial is made in the form of a larger-than-life statue of a peasant armed with a scythe adapted to the function of a slashing weapon.

== See also ==
- Pugachev's Rebellion
- Revolt of Horea, Cloșca, and Crișan
