= Letters patent =

Type of published legal instrument

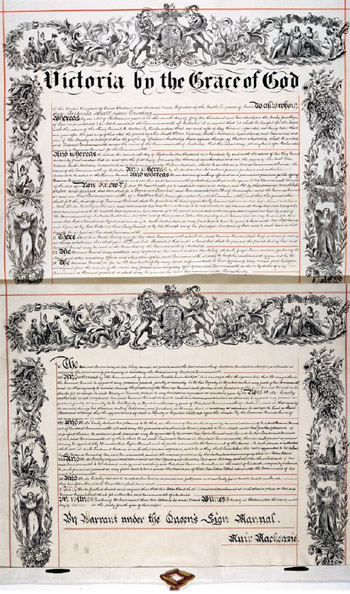
Letters patent issued by Queen Victoria in 1900 creating the office of Governor-General of Australia as part of the process of federation

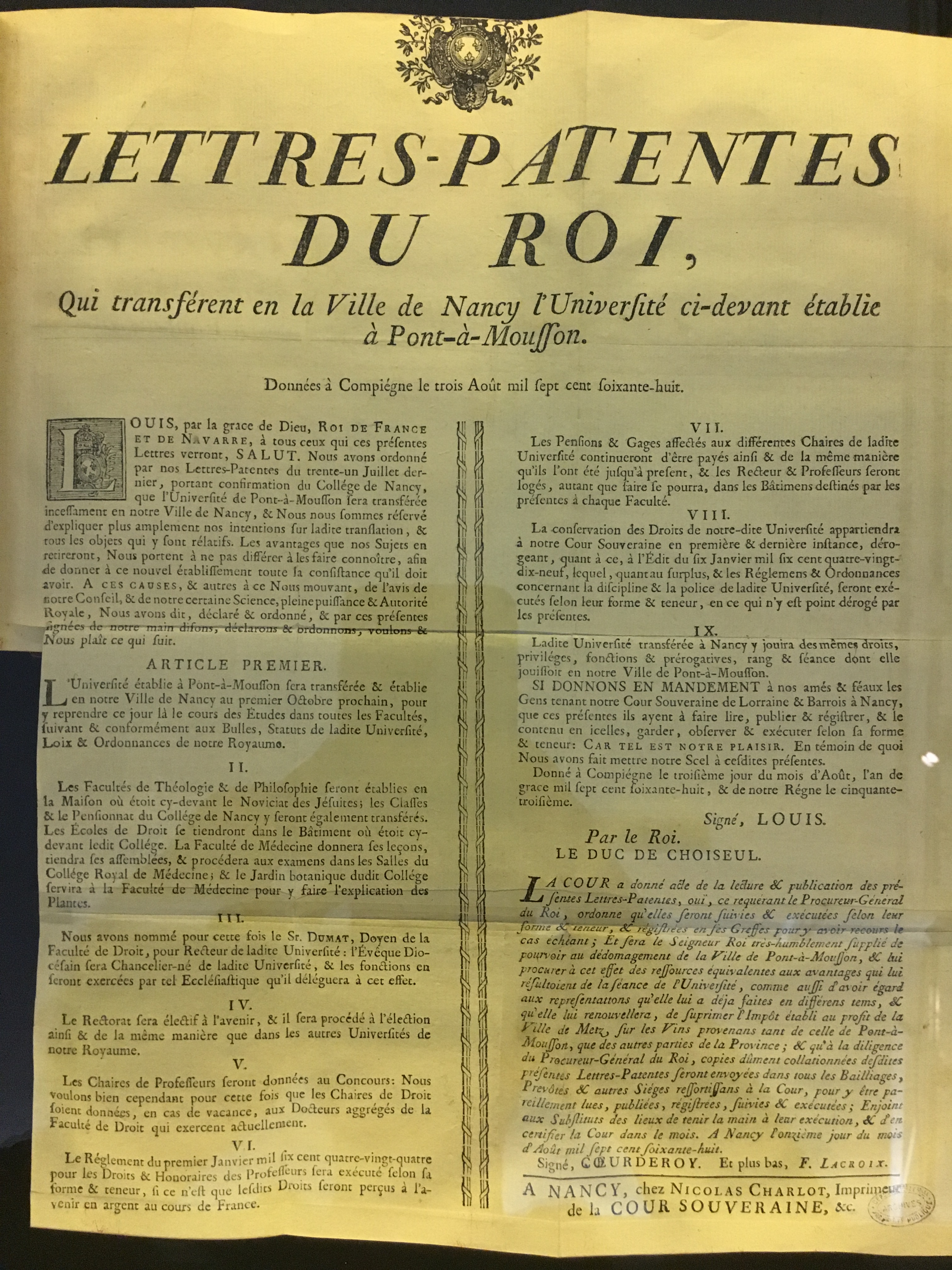
Letters patent transferring a predecessor of the University of Lorraine to Nancy in 1768

Letters patent (plural form for singular and plural) are a type of legal instrument in the form of a published written order issued by a monarch, president or other head of state, generally granting an office or right, or monopoly, title or status to a person or corporation. Letters patent can be used for the creation of corporations or government offices, or to grant city status or coats of arms. Letters patent are issued for the appointment of representatives of the Crown, such as governors and governors-general of Commonwealth realms, as well as appointing a Royal Commission. In the United Kingdom, they are also issued for the creation of peers of the realm.

A particular form of letters patent has evolved into the modern intellectual property patent (referred to as a utility patent or design patent in United States patent law) granting exclusive rights in an invention or design. In this case, it is essential that the written grant should be in the form of a public (patent) document so other inventors can consult it both to avoid infringement (while the patent remains in force) and to understand how to put it into practical use (once the patent rights expire). In the Holy Roman Empire, Austrian Empire, and Austria-Hungary, imperial patent was also the highest form of generally binding legal regulations, e.g. Patent of Toleration, Serfdom Patent, etc.

The opposite of letters patent are letters close (Latin: litterae clausae), which are personal in nature and sealed so that only the recipient can read their contents. Letters patent are thus comparable to other kinds of open letter in that their audience is wide. It is not clear how the contents of letters patent became widely published before collection by the addressee, for example whether they were left after sealing by the king for inspection during a certain period by courtiers in a royal palace, who would disseminate the contents back to the gentry in the shires through normal conversation and social intercourse. Today, for example, it is a convention for the British prime minister to announce that they have left a document they wish to enter the public domain "in the library of the House of Commons", where it may be freely perused by all members of parliament.

== Meaning ==
Letters patent are so named from the Latin verb patēre, pateo, 'to lie open, exposed, accessible'. The originator's seal was attached pendent from the document, so that it did not have to be broken in order for the document to be read.

They are called "letters" (plural) from their Latin name litterae patentes, used by medieval and later scribes when the documents were written in Latin. This loanword preserves the collective plural "letters" (litterae) that the Latin language uses to denote a message as opposed to a single alphabet letter (littera).

== Usage ==
Letters patent are a form of open or public proclamation and a vestigial exercise of extra-parliamentary power by a monarch or president.

They can thus be contrasted with the Act of Parliament, which is in effect a written order by Parliament involving assent by the monarch in conjunction with its members. No explicit government approval is contained within letters patent, only the seal or signature of the monarch.

Parliament today tolerates only a very narrow exercise of the royal prerogative by issuance of letters patent, and such documents are issued with prior informal government approval, or indeed are now generated by government itself with the monarch's seal affixed as a mere formality. In their original form they were simply written instructions or orders from the sovereign, whose order was law, which were made public to reinforce their effect.

For the sake of good governance, it is of little use if the sovereign appoints a person to a position of authority but does not at the same time inform those over whom such authority is to be exercised of the validity of the appointment.

According to the United Kingdom Ministry of Justice, there are 92 different types of letters patent. The Patent Rolls are made up of office copies of English (and later United Kingdom) royal letters patent, which run in an almost unbroken series from 1201 to the present day, with most of those to 1625 having been published.

== United Kingdom and Commonwealth realms ==
In the United Kingdom and other Commonwealth realms, letters patent are royal proclamations granting an office, right, title, or status to a person (and sometimes in regard to corporations and cities). Letters patent take the form of an open letter from the monarch to a subject, although this is a legal fiction and they are in fact a royal decree made under the royal prerogative and are treated as statute law. Letters patent do not require the consent of parliament.

Specific usage in Commonwealth realms outside the United Kingdom include:

- Creation of vice-regal offices, for example in Canada in 1947 and New Zealand in 1983.
- Creation of Royal Commissions or Special Commissions of Inquiry, such as in Australia.

== United States ==
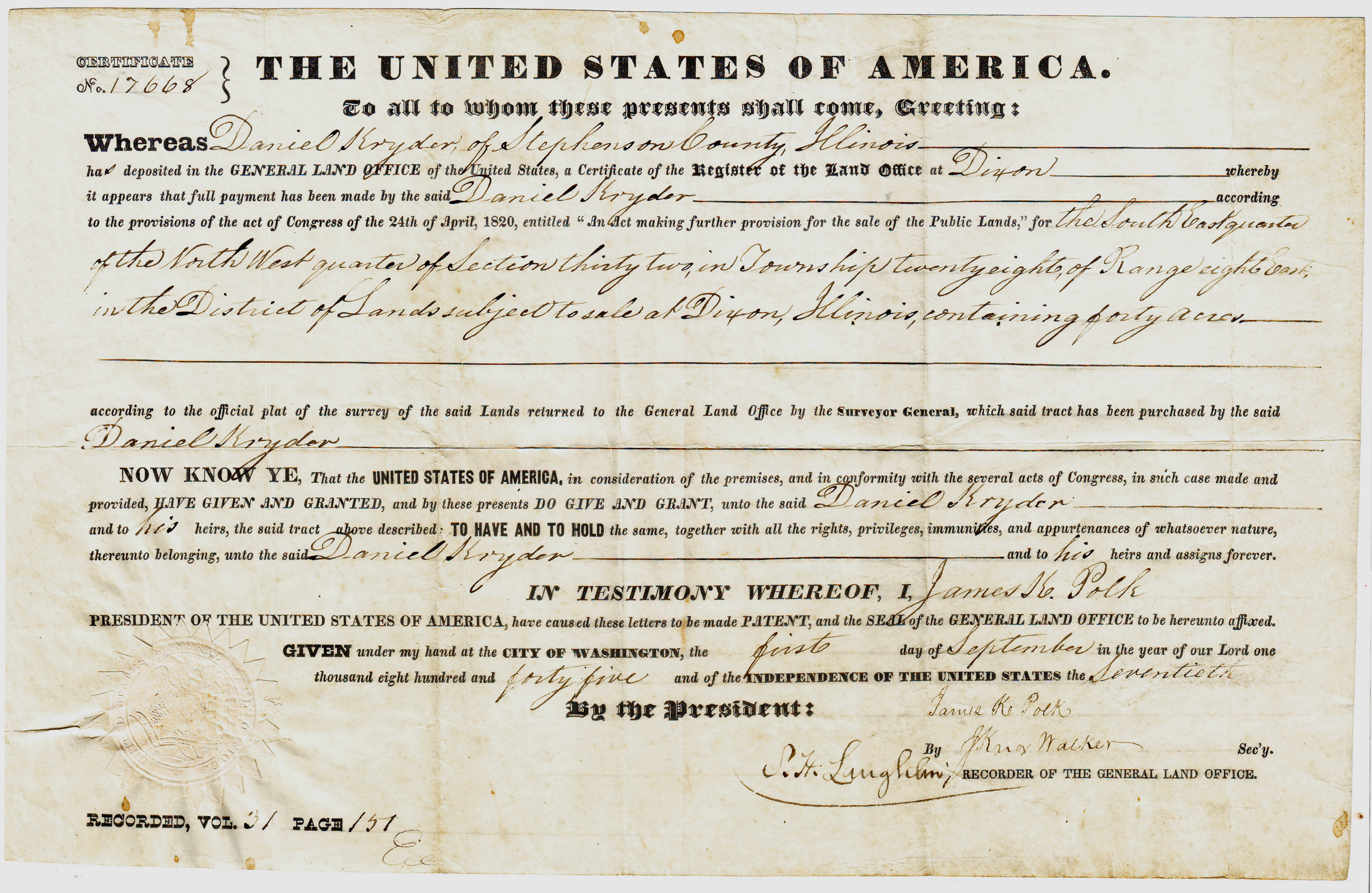
Letters patent issued by the United States General Land Office

The primary source of letters patent in the United States are intellectual property patents and land patents, though letters patent are issued for a variety of other purposes. They function dually as public records and personal certificates.

In the United States, the forgery of letters patent granted by the president is a crime subject to fine, imprisonment up to ten years or both (18 U.S.C. § 497). Without letters patent, a person is unable to assume an appointed office. Such an issue prompted the Marbury v. Madison suit, where William Marbury and three others petitioned the United States Supreme Court to order James Madison to deliver their letters for appointments made under the previous administration.

=== Form of United States letters patent ===
The form of the eschatocol, or formal ending, is as follows:

IN TESTIMONY WHEREOF, the undersigned [public official], in accordance with [relevant law], has in the name of the United States, Caused these letters to be made Patent and the Seal of [relevant agency or government official] to be hereunto affixed.

GIVEN under my hand, in [city] the [date] in the year of our Lord [year] and of the Independence of the United States the [years since July 4, 1776].

By [signature of public official issuing letter]

== See also ==
- Commissioning scroll
- Exequatur
- Firman
- Letter of marque
- Lettre de cachet
- Papal bull, a type of letters patent issued by a pope
- Royal Charter
- Royal manufactories in France
- Statute of Monopolies 1623, an attempt to rein in the abuse of letters patent in England
