= Oldřich Dědek =

Czech economist (born 1953)

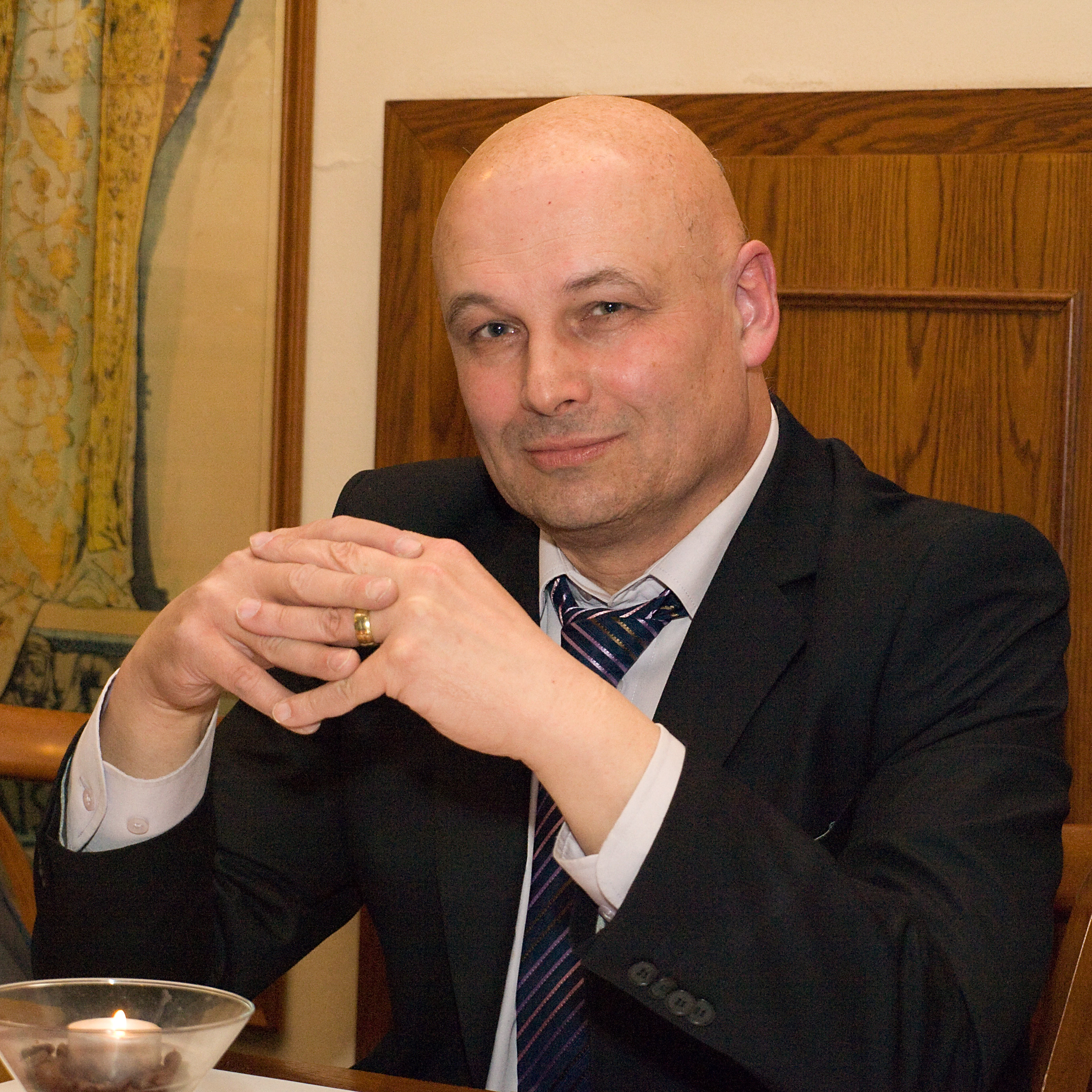
Oldřich Dědek (2014)

Oldřich Dědek (born 26 November 1953) is a Czech economist. He graduated in agricultural economics from the University of Economics, Prague. He was born in Chlumec nad Cidlinou.

== Career ==
After completing his studies in 1978, Dedek was employed by the Economic Institute of the Czechoslovak Academy of Sciences, where he worked as a researcher specialising in economic policy. In 1992, he joined the Czech National Bank (Česká národní banka) as Deputy Director of the Institute of Economics, and in 1996, he was appointed an adviser to the ČNB Governor. He was formerly a member of the Scientific Council of the Faculty of Social Sciences at Charles University in Prague, where he lectures on financial market issues and European Economic integration (a 3-modeule course supported by the Jean Monnet grant which also includes courses by Katerina Smidkova and Wadim Strielkowski. He was named a Full Professor by the Charles University in Prague in 2011.

As an adviser to Prime Minister Josef Tošovský in the first half of 1998 Dedek headed the team of authors who prepared the document Economic Strategy of Joining the European Union: Starting Points and Directions. From 13 February 1999 to 2005, he was a ČNB Vice-Governor.

In 2017, President Milos Zeman appointed Dedek and fellow economist Marek Mora to the seven-member board of the Czech National Bank.

== Other activities ==
Dedek is currently a member of the Administrative Board of Charles University and of the Scientific and Pedagogical Board of the Masaryk Institute of Advanced Studies at the Czech Technical University.
