= Václav Kliment Klicpera =

Czech playwright and poet

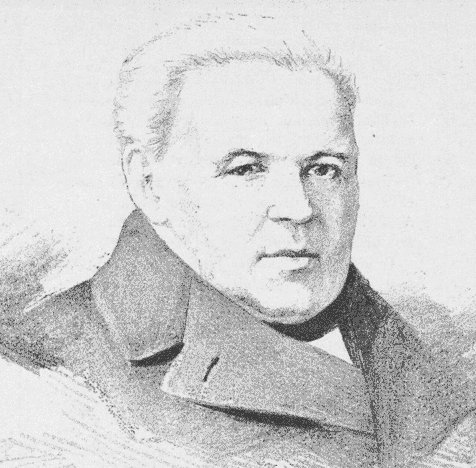
- Portrait of Klicpera by Jan Vilímek, 1883
- Born: 23 November 1792; Chlumec nad Cidlinou, Bohemia
- Died: 15 September 1859 (aged 66); Prague, Bohemia, Austrian Empire
- Resting place: Olšany Cemetery, Prague
- Occupation: Playwright
- Writing career
- Notable works: Divotvorný klobouk Hadrián z Římsů

Václav Kliment Klicpera (23 November 1792 – 15 September 1859) was a Czech playwright and poet. He was a prolific author of his own plays and was one of the first presenters of Czech-language drama. He was especially influential in the foundation of comedic Czech theatre.

== Life ==
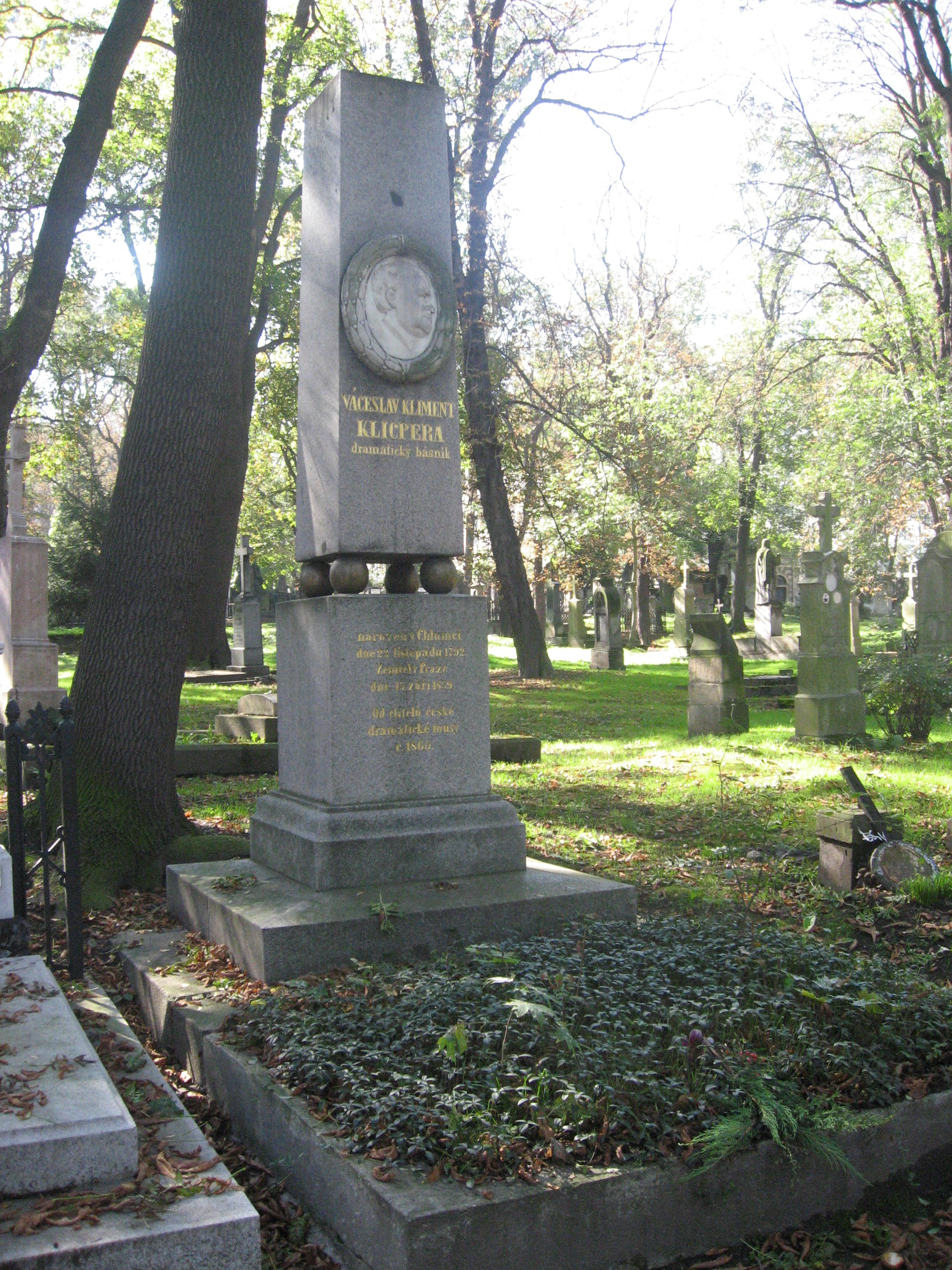
Klicpera' grave at the Olšany Cemetery

Václav Klement Klicpera was born on 23 November 1792 in Chlumec nad Cidlinou. Later he started writing Kliment as his middle name. He first began to learn to be a tailor, like his father, and then a butcher, but due to health reasons he ended his apprenticeship in 1808 and began studying at a gymnasium in Prague. From 1813, he was part of an amateur troupe, where he met Anna Švamberková, which he married in 1819. After graduating from the gymnasium in 1813, he studied philosophy until 1816 and medicine until 1818. He then studied humanities and among his teachers were Josef Jungmann and Josef Dobrovský. From 1819, he was a teacher at the gymnasium in Hradec Králové. His students included František Škroup, Josef Kajetán Tyl and Karel Jaromír Erben.

He and his older brother František became involved in the patriotic movement. Václav Kliment Klicpera made his debut as a playwright in March 1816 with the successful play Blaník, played in the Estates Theatre. He collaborated with amateur troupes as an organiser, author, director, and until 1823 as an actor. At his own expense, he published Czech-language plays (Klicpera's theatre – Almanac of dramatic plays) that contributed to the development of Czech amateur theatre.

From the 1820s, his plays were regularly played at the Estates Theatre, but they were edited for a German-speaking audience, which for a time discouraged him from publishing further plays. The turning point came in 1835, when the Josef Kajetán Tyl Theatre Group was founded (performing in the Estate Theatre).

After the death of his first wife, he married a second time in 1838 to Anna Trnková (1814–1900). In 1842, he became temporarily deaf as a result of an illness. In 1846, he left Hradec Králové, moved to Prague and started to teach at the Academic Gymnasium in Prague. Among his students were Vítězslav Hálek, Jan Neruda and Josef Václav Frič. In 1850, he became director of the Academic Gymnasium, which became the first Czech-language gymnasium during his management. In Prague, Klicpera also worked as a politician and actively participated in the revolutionary events of 1848. Due to his participation in them and for allowing an unauthorised student magazine to be published at his school, he was forced to retire early in 1853. He did not create any other work after that.

Klicpera died on 15 September 1859 in Prague. He is buried at the city's Olšany Cemetery.

== Work ==
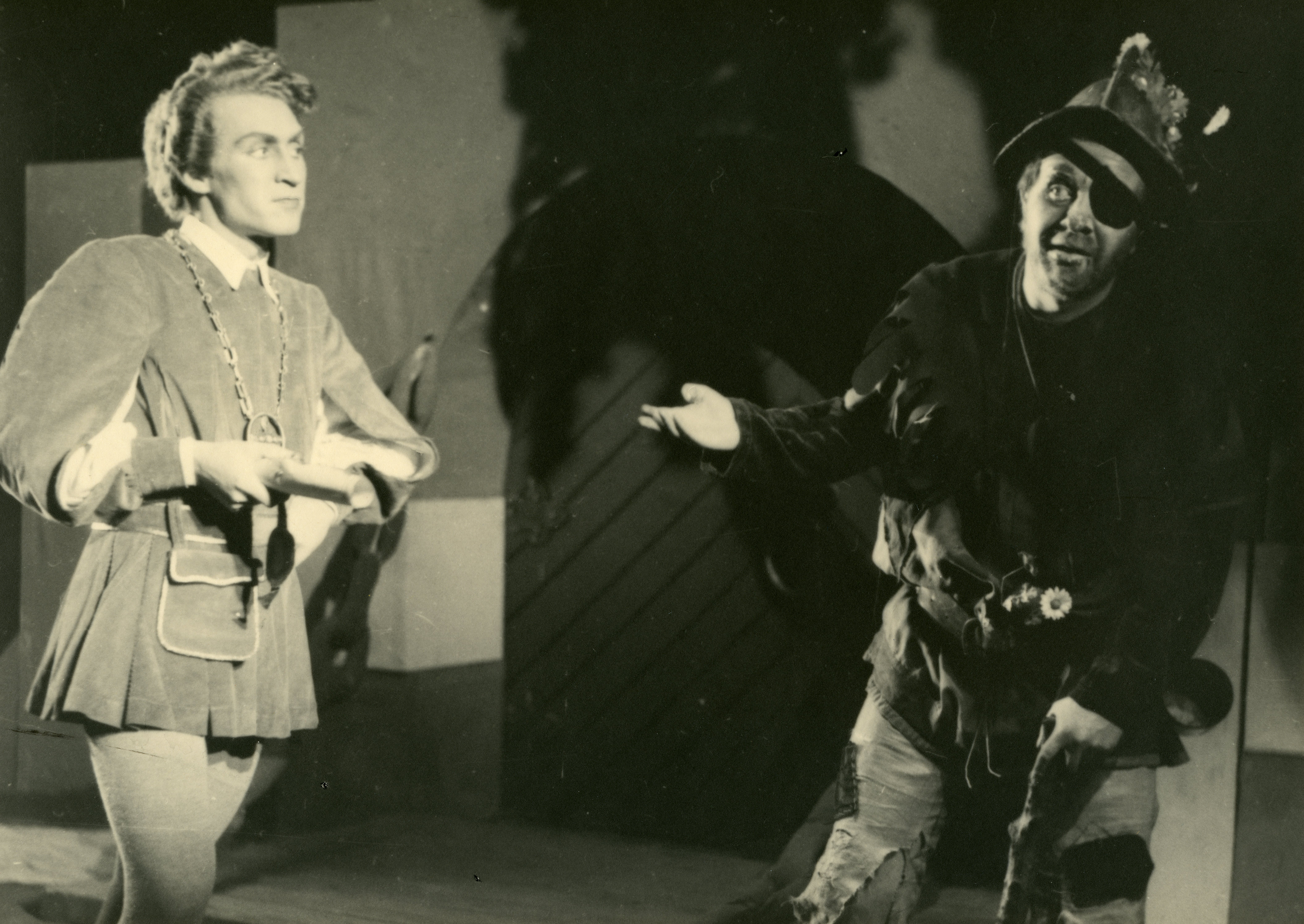
Hadrián z Římsů, played in J. K. Tyl Theatre in Plzeň in 1949

Klicpera wrote 57 plays, basically all of them original. He wrote most often comedies (21 works). Some of his plays have not survived and are only mentioned in the contemporary press or in the manuscripts of his descendants.

He was skilled in writing vaudeville plays and patriotically-themed historical dramas that became the foundation of modern Czech drama. He is also recognised for his farces (in Czech frašky). He also wrote historical romance stories, plays from his own era, and plays with fairy tale motifs. In the 1840s, he specialised in so-called "knight dramas", where he used guises and changed the identity of characters.

His notable plays include:

- Divotvorný klobouk, 1820
- Hadrián z Římsů, 1821
- Rohovín Čtverrohý, 1825
- Veselohra na mostě, 1826
- Každý něco pro vlast, before 1829
- Ján za chrta dán, 1829
- Zlý jelen, 1849

Klicpera was also a poet to a lesser extent. His best-known poetic work is Deklamovánky (1841), a collection of humorous verses for social entertainment with patriotic content.

== Honours and legacy ==
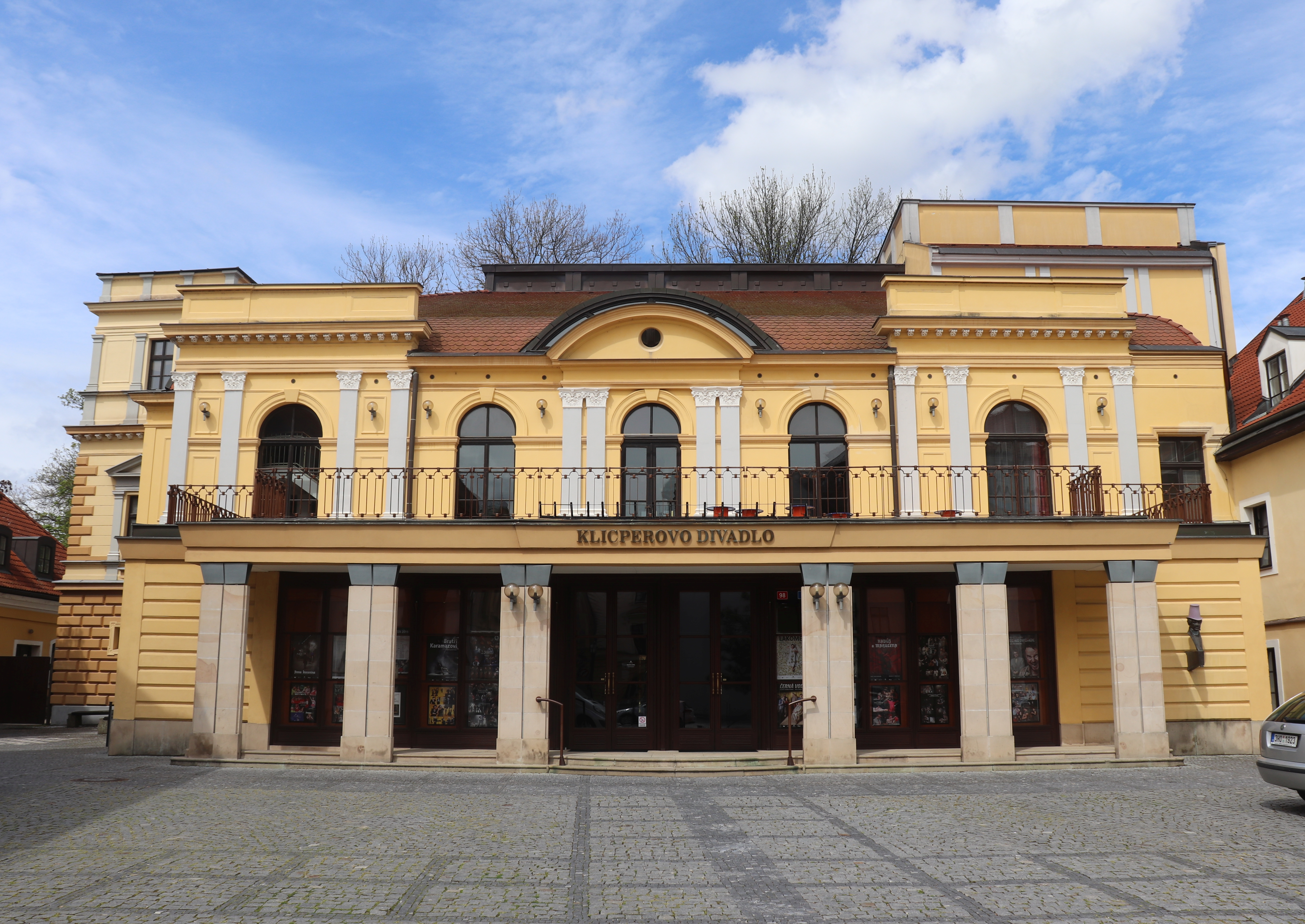
Klicpera Theatre in Hradec Králové

During his lifetime, in 1833, Klicpera became an honorary resident of the city of Hradec Králové, making him the first person in history to be granted honorary citizenship.

The Klicpera Theatre Company operates in Klicpera's hometown of Chlumec nad Cidlinou. Every year, the town and the theatre company organize the Klicpera's Chlumec amateur theatre festival. It was established in 1937 and the 77th edition took place in 2024. The town cultural centre, where the festival is held, also bears Klicpera's name.

The theatre in Hradec Králové bears Klicpera's name. It was founded in 1885 and has a professional ensemble since 1949. The Gallery U Klicperů is located in the theatre's foyer.

Dozens of cities and towns in the Czech Republic have a street named after Václav Kliment Klicpera, including Prague (Smíchov), Brno, Ostrava, Plzeň, Liberec, Olomouc and Hradec Králové.
