= Josef Rumler =

Czech poet, literary critic, historian, editor, and translator

Josef Rumler (20 July 1922 in Chlumec nad Cidlinou – 1 November 1999 in Prague) was a Czech poet, literary critic, historian, editor and translator from Polish language and to Esperanto.

== Selected works ==
- Vynášení houslí (1970)
- Hrnek ranního mléka (1973)
- Výstup na horu Říp (1978)
