= Jakub Obrovský =

Czech artist

Medal record

Art competitions

Representing Czechoslovakia

Olympic Games
Bronze medal – third place	1932 Los Angeles	Sculpture: Statues

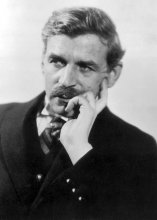
Jakub Obrovský

Jakub Obrovský (24 December 1882 – 31 March 1949) was a Czechoslovak artist, sculptor and writer.

== Biography ==
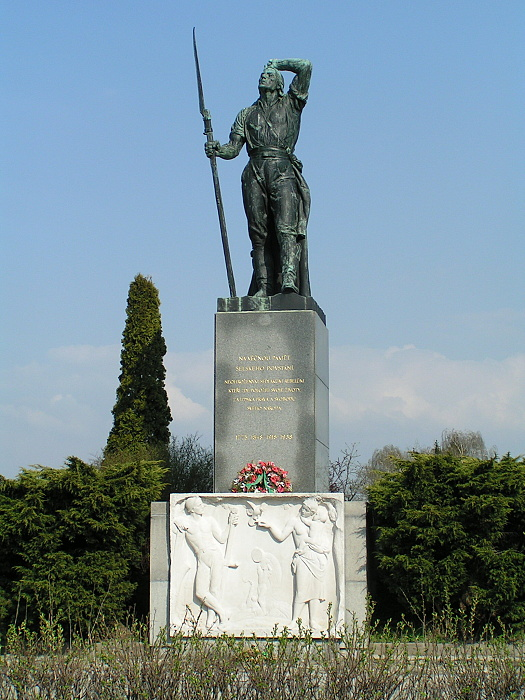
Memorial of 1775 peasant rebellion created by Obrovský

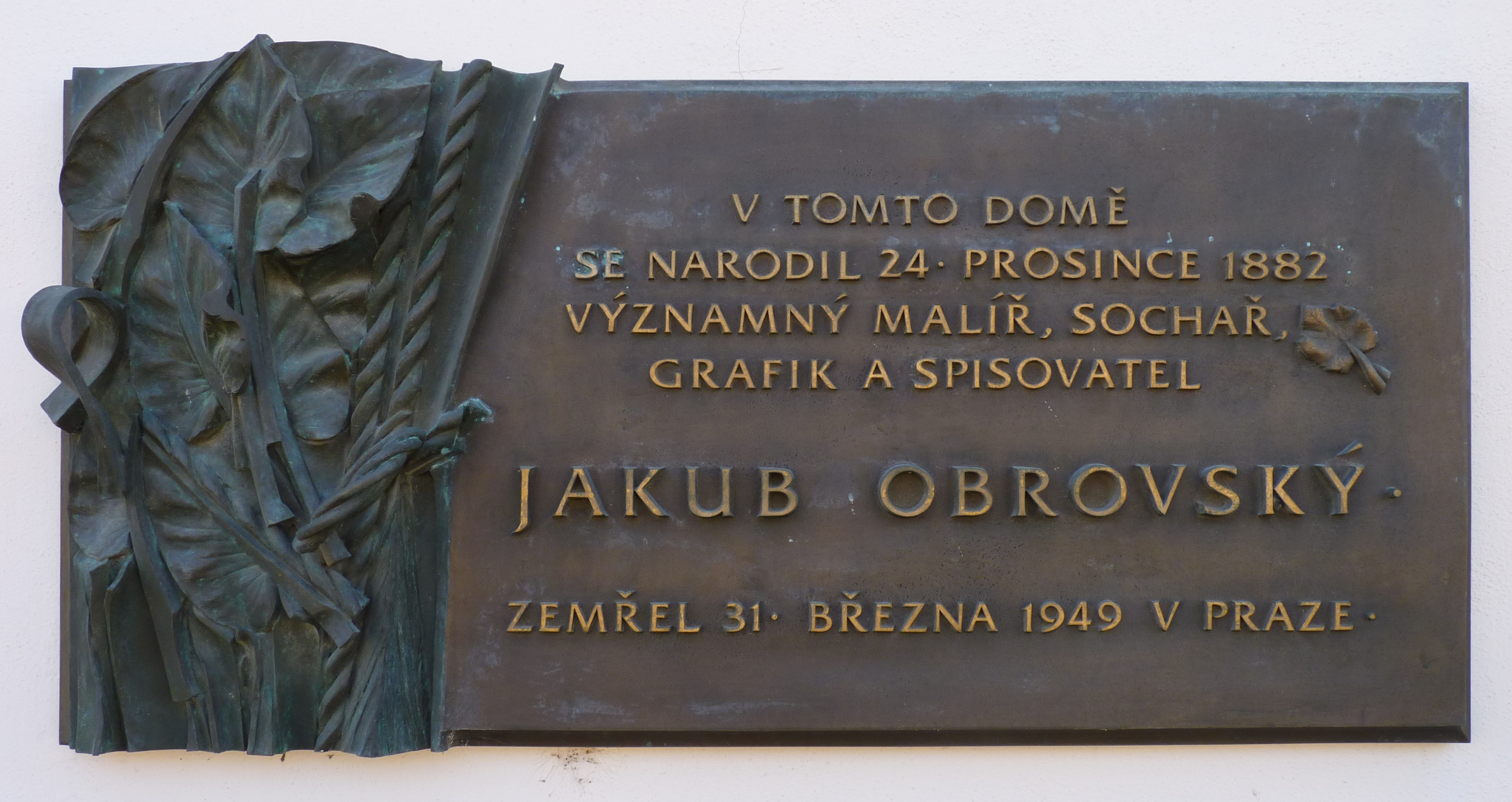

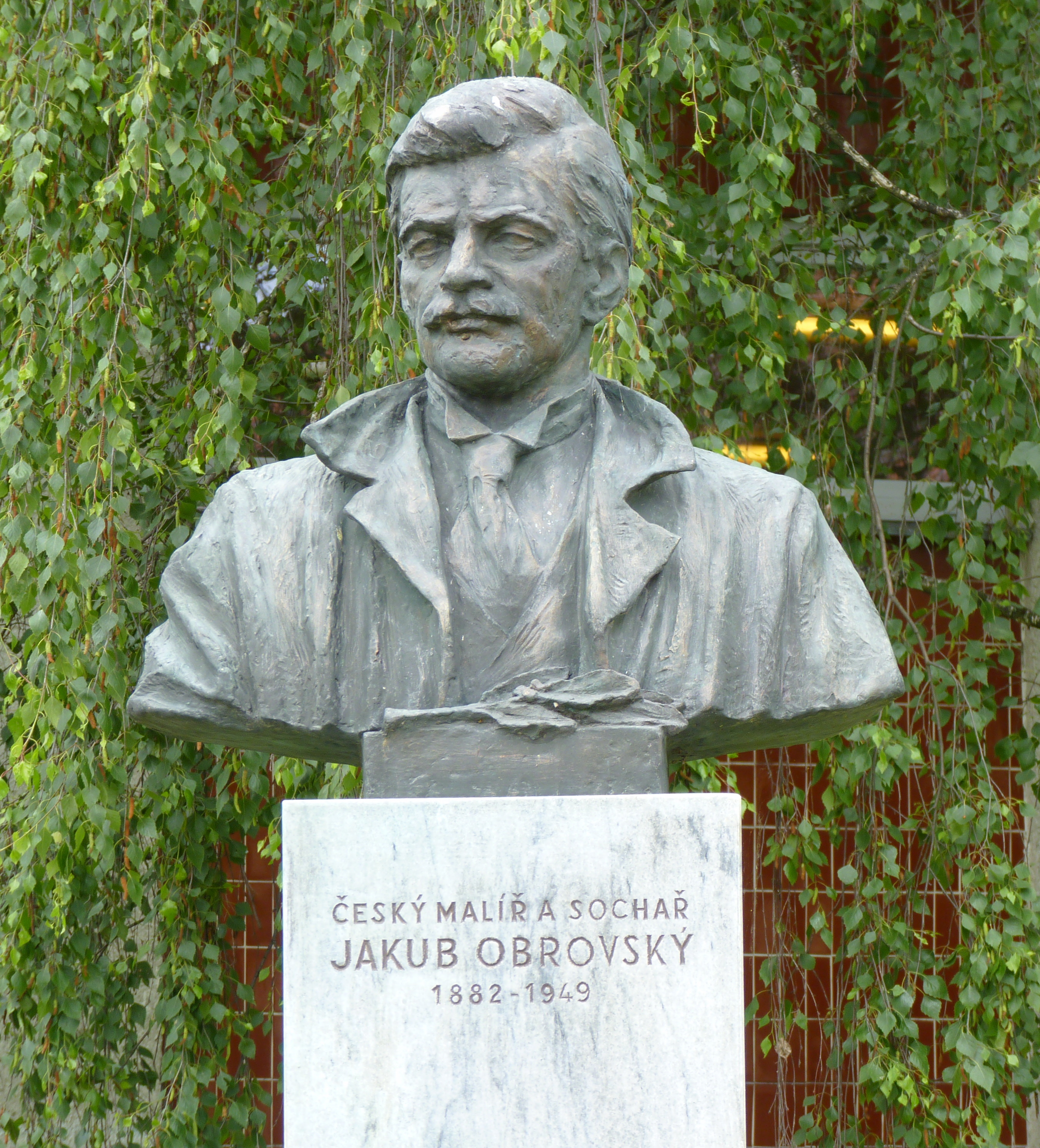
Bust of Jakub Obrovský

Jakub Obrovský was born in Brno-Bystrc. He studied at the School of Applied Arts in Prague with Celda Klouček, EK Liška and Stanislav Sucharda (1897-1901) and continued his studies at the Academy of Fine Arts with Max Pirner (1901-1905). In 1919 he became a professor at the Academy of Fine Arts, and later served as the rector.

Obrovský favored women's figures in his paintings, and often sculpted figures of athletes. He designed early stamps of the new Republic of Czechoslovakia: the lion escaping from its chains (28 October 1919) and the allegory of economy (1920).

In 1932 he won a bronze medal for Czechoslovakia in the art competitions of the Olympic Games for his "Odysseus" (see Art competitions at the 1932 Summer Olympics).

Obrovský died in Prague. His daughter Jana Obrovská (1930–1987) became a noted Czech composer.
