= Obědovice =

- Municipality
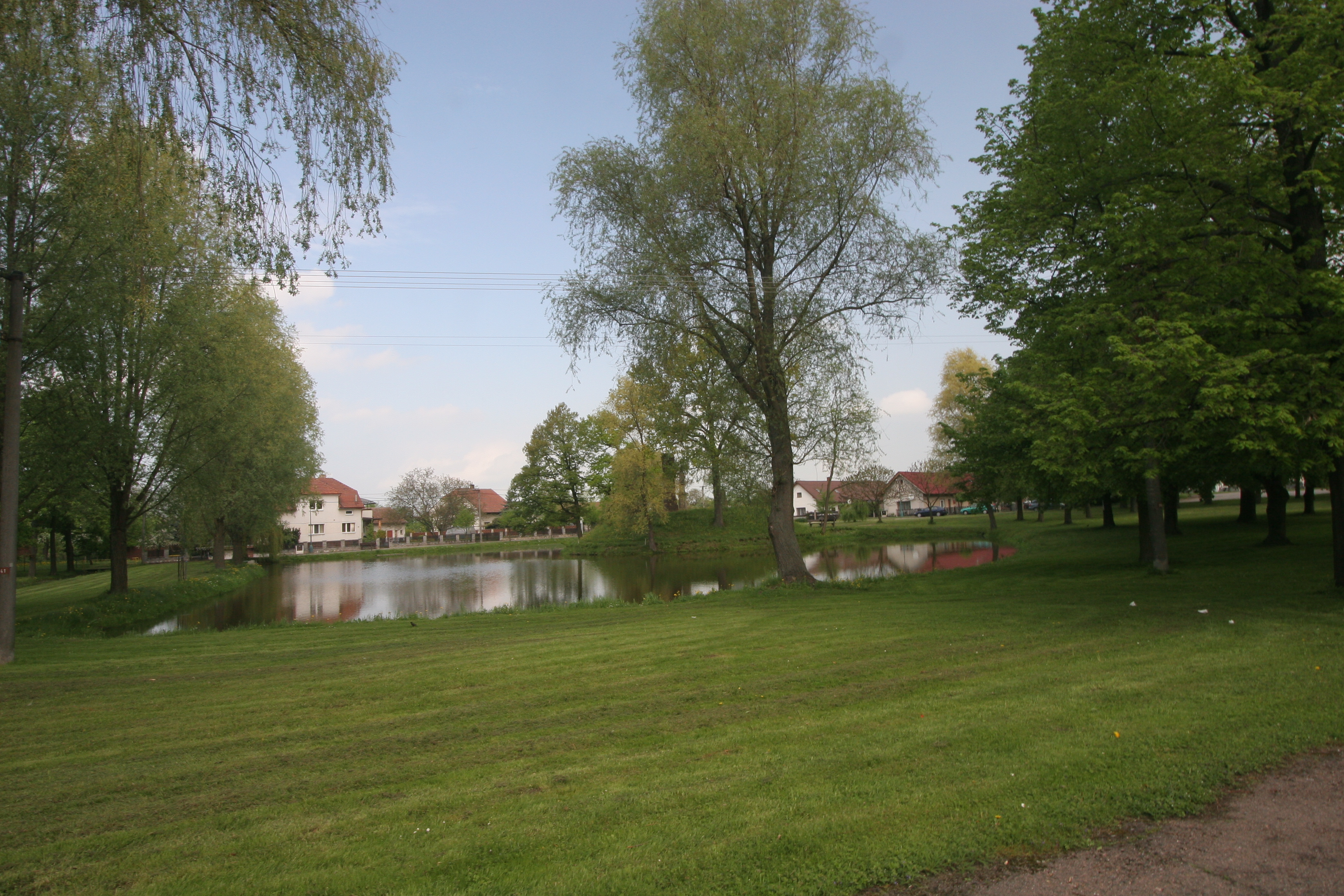
- Centre of Obědovice

- Flag Coat of arms

- Location in the Czech Republic
- Coordinates: 50°9′40″N 15°34′56″E
- Country: Czech Republic
- Region: Hradec Králové
- District: Hradec Králové
- First mentioned: 1386

Area
  - Total: 3.88 km^{2} (1.50 sq mi)
- Elevation: 236 m (774 ft)

Population (2026-01-01)
  - Total: 338
  - Density: 87.1/km^{2} (226/sq mi)
- Time zone: UTC+1 (CET)
  - Summer (DST): UTC+2 (CEST)
- Postal code: 503 51
- Website: obedovice.cz

Obědovice is a municipality and village in Hradec Králové District in the Hradec Králové Region of the Czech Republic. It has about 300 inhabitants.

== Demographics ==
Historical population
Year	Pop.	±%
1869	333	—
1880	377	+13.2%
1890	455	+20.7%
1900	359	−21.1%
1910	376	+4.7%
1921	390	+3.7%
1930	400	+2.6%
1950	329	−17.8%
1961	292	−11.2%
1970	279	−4.5%
1980	277	−0.7%
1991	246	−11.2%
2001	234	−4.9%
2011	273	+16.7%
2021	308	+12.8%
Source: Censuses
