= Karlova Koruna Chateau =

Karlova Koruna
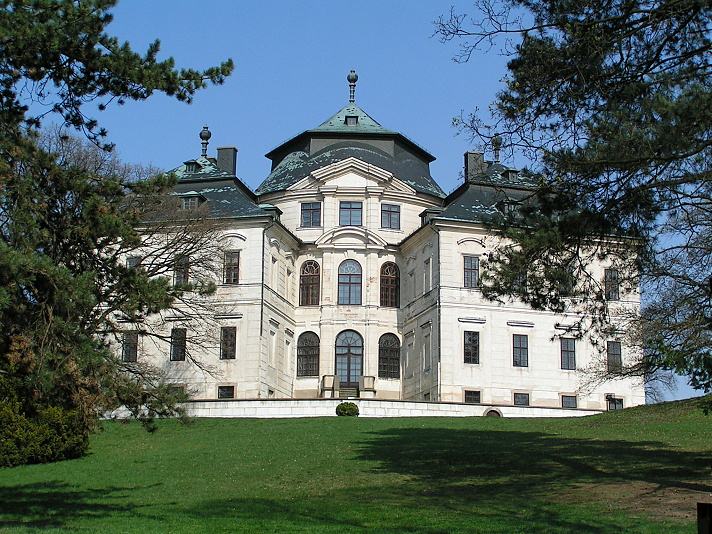

- Location within Czech Republic

General information
- Type: Chateau
- Architectural style: Baroque
- Location: Chlumec nad Cidlinou, Hradec Králové District, Hradec Králové Region, Czech Republic
- Coordinates: 50°9′32″N 15°27′4″E
- Opened: 1723

Website
- www.kinskycastles.com/castle-chlumec.htm

Karlova Koruna (German: Karlskron) is a château in the town of Chlumec nad Cidlinou in the Czech Republic.

== History ==
The château was built for František Ferdinand Kinský in 1721–23. Construction was completed in time for King Charles VI's coronation. František Ferdinand Kinský invited the king to the château and named the castle after the king (Karlova Koruna means Charles' crown in English). Originally, there was a stronghold as nobleman seat in Chlumec nad Cidlinou town, and the first mention in a source-books is from 1424 when the stronghold was conquered by the warrior Boček of Poděbrady. In the beginning of the 16th century a new renaissance fortification was built. The Kinský family obtained this property in the beginning of the 17th century and kept it till 1948. It was returned to the family after 1990. The High Chancellor of Bohemian Kingdom count František Ferdinand Kinský (1668 – 1741) decided to convert the building into a folly corresponding to the reputation of his noble family. Some of the best architects and master builders of that times – Jan Blažej Santini-Aichel and František Maxmilián Kaňka – were engaged to create this work of art. As a dedication, this new pleasure house was named after emperor Karel VI. who visited Chlumec in September 1723 while returning from his coronation in Prague. In the middle of the 17th century the Kinský family began to use this folly more often. That is why the property was enlarged – detached administrative and accommodation wings were newly built. The hippodrome, where the Chlumec peasants of well-known uprising were imprisoned in 1775, also grew up in this time.

== Architecture ==
The basic architectural design was drafted by Santini-Aichel. The details and participation in the building process can be attributed to Kaňka. The manor's design reveals one of the most noteworthy manor dispositions created in the Czech lands. The central high cylindrical body of the building is occupied by a three storied main hall to which 3 wings are connected. Due to this the manor does not need passages and its external appearance changes as the observer walks around it. The architecture of the chateau reflects the charisma and unique craft of Santini-Aichel and Kaňka. This is best demonstrated on a horizontal projection – three cubes are projecting from surmounting central cylinder. All views of the chateau are similar – opening wings extend from high central mass. The whole building is decorated by a light bossage, a simple string course, a weathering and a cornice. There are also soprafenstras. Three layered gables (one on each side) are above the cornice. Due to this combination of dynamical design and modest decoration is Karlova Koruna chateau considered to be one of the best Santini-Aichl's structure.

The stately staircase is situated on the north side. It is half-covered in buttress and leads into the first floor. In a ground-floor, the main central space is conceived as a sala terrena divided by six columns. The ceremonial Marble hall lined with Ionian demi-columns and gallery occupies the first and the second floor of the building. From this central cylinder the three lower wings run out. In these three square-shaped parts dwelling spaces, receiving rooms, parlours and cabinets are situated.

Every wing has its own mansard. The mansard of the central part is constructed as a cone and octahedral spire.

== Inspirations ==
According to Mojmír Horyna the building was designed as a „radius centrally planned building“, the type Santini-Aichel had applied to sacral buildings in Panenské Břežany, Ostrov u Stříbra and Zelená Hora, and now newly used to create profane building. Santini-Aichel was probably influenced by Gian Lorenzo Bernini's studies of using centrally planned building for designing profane architecture. The influence of Austrian architect Johann Bernhard Fischer von Erlach is also clear.

== Reconstructions ==
In the last years of the 19th century the chateau was rebuilt. Between 1908 – 1909 outbuildings were reconstructed according to the plans of Friedrich Ohmann. Master builder Josef Blecha jr. and architect Ludvík Lábler carried out another great re-adjustment between 1927 – 1928. After a fire in 1943 the chateau was repaired by SÚRPMO office in 1967. After 1990 the property was restituted to the Kinský family.

== Surroundings ==
The Karlova Koruna chateau, situated on the top of small hill, was created as point de vue of the neighbouring park. Many remarkable species grow there – e.g. European black pine (Pinus nigra) or Turkish hazel (Corylus colurna). Santini-Aichel also designed nearby chapel of Saint John the Baptist (earlier The chapel of Annunciation). This hexagonal-shaped building used to serve as a family sepulchre. In the early 19th century, an orangery designed by Kinský's master builder Heinrich Koch in the Empire style was built.

== Famous visitors ==
Among famous guests there were many European monarchs. The Emperor Karel VI. – visited the place twice (in 1723 and in 1732), king Friedrich II of Prussia (who shortly occupied Chlumec in 1742), the Empress Maria Theresa (in 1743).

== Exposition ==
Original exposition Baroque in Bohemia was replaced with interior exposition that shows the history of the Kinsky lineage and the history of Kinsky horse breeding.

== Gallery ==
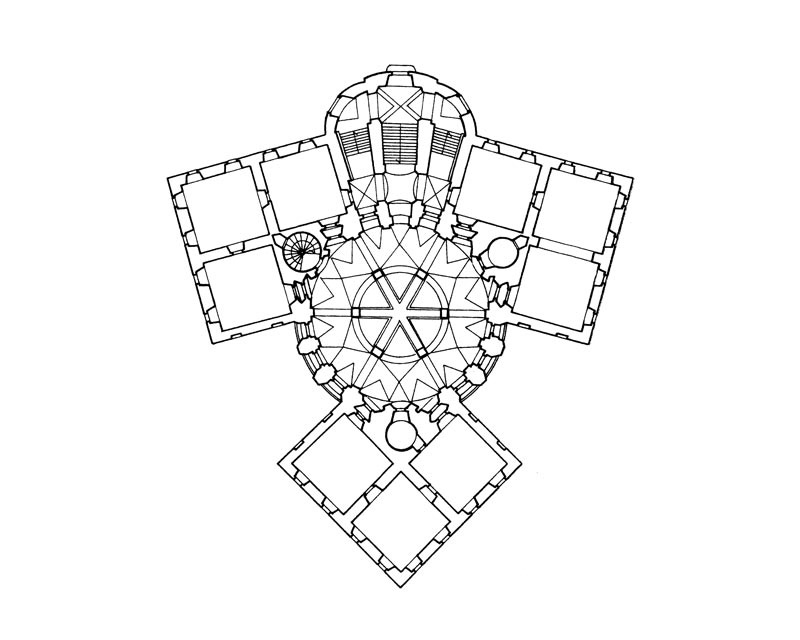
Ground plan of the château

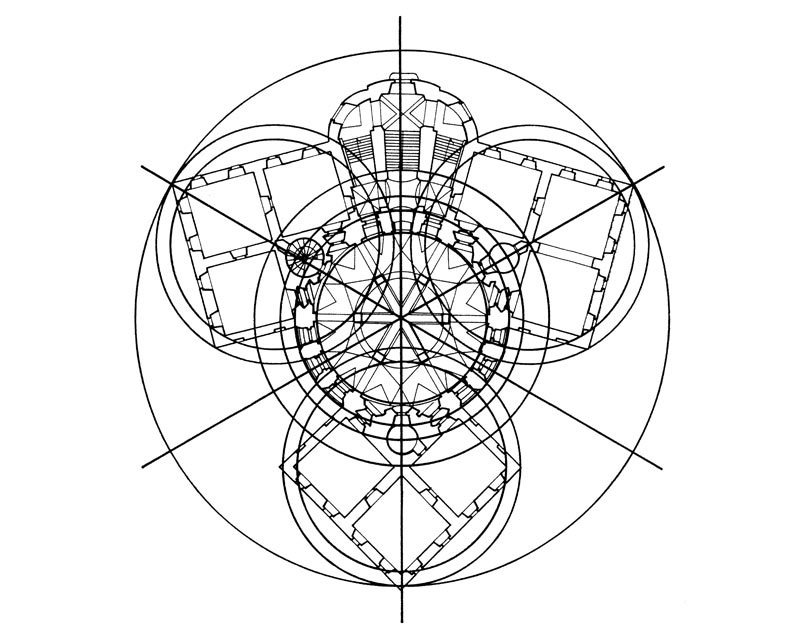
Ground plan of the château

== Bibliography ==
- Mrázek, Jindřich, Česko-anglicko-německý slovník výtvarného umění, Olomouc 1994.
- Horyna, Mojmír, Jan Blažej Santini - Aichel, Praha 1998.
- Pinkas, Jaroslav, Pátková, Svatava: Karlova Koruna. Chlumec nad Cidlinou, in: Unikátní encyklopedie na pokračování. Památky, Plzeň 2003.
- Koch, Wilfied, Evropská architektura, Banská Bystrica 2008.
