= Chlumec nad Cidlinou =

- Town
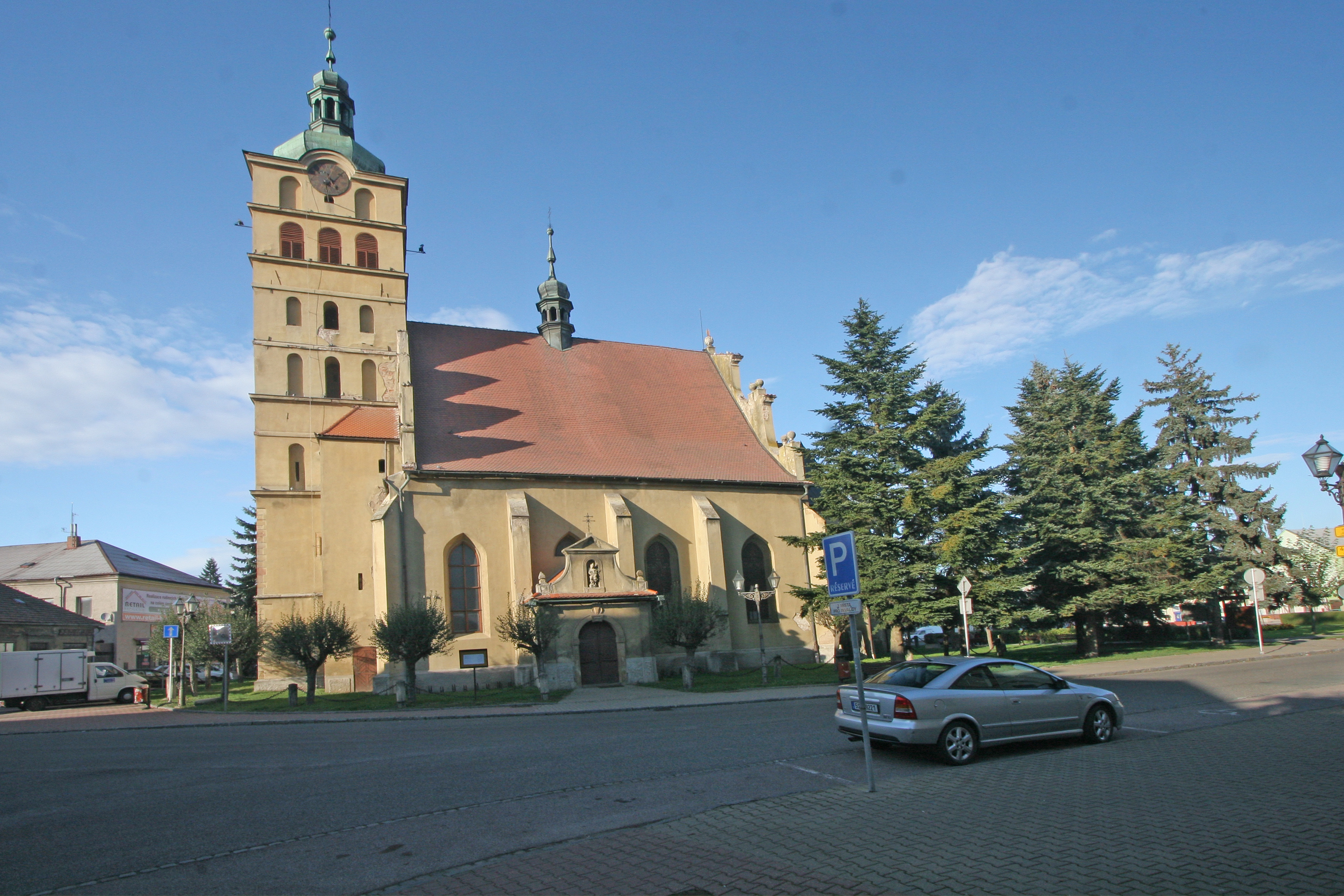
- Church of Saint Ursula

- Flag Coat of arms

- Location in the Czech Republic
- Coordinates: 50°9′20″N 15°27′28″E
- Country: Czech Republic
- Region: Hradec Králové
- District: Hradec Králové
- First mentioned: 1235

Government
  - Mayor: Vladan Kárník

Area
  - Total: 21.44 km^{2} (8.28 sq mi)
- Elevation: 223 m (732 ft)

Population (2026-01-01)
  - Total: 5,606
  - Density: 261.5/km^{2} (677.2/sq mi)
- Time zone: UTC+1 (CET)
  - Summer (DST): UTC+2 (CEST)
- Postal code: 503 51
- Website: www.chlumecnc.cz

Chlumec nad Cidlinou (Czech pronunciation: [ˈxlumɛts ˈnat tsɪdlɪnou]; German: Chlumetz an der Zidlina) is a town in Hradec Králové District in the Hradec Králové Region of the Czech Republic. It has about 5,600 inhabitants. The town is located at the confluence of the Cidlina and Bystřice rivers, in the East Elbe Table. The main landmark of Chlumec nad Cidlinou is the Karlova Koruna Chateau.

== Administrative division ==
Chlumec nad Cidlinou consists of seven municipal parts (in brackets population according to the 2021 census):

- Chlumec nad Cidlinou I (733)
- Chlumec nad Cidlinou II (221)
- Chlumec nad Cidlinou III (1,171)
- Chlumec nad Cidlinou IV (2,932)
- Kladruby (207)
- Lučice (172)
- Pamětník (116)

== Etymology ==
The town's name Chlumec is a diminutive of the old Czech word chlum, which meant 'hill' (covered with forest).

== Geography ==
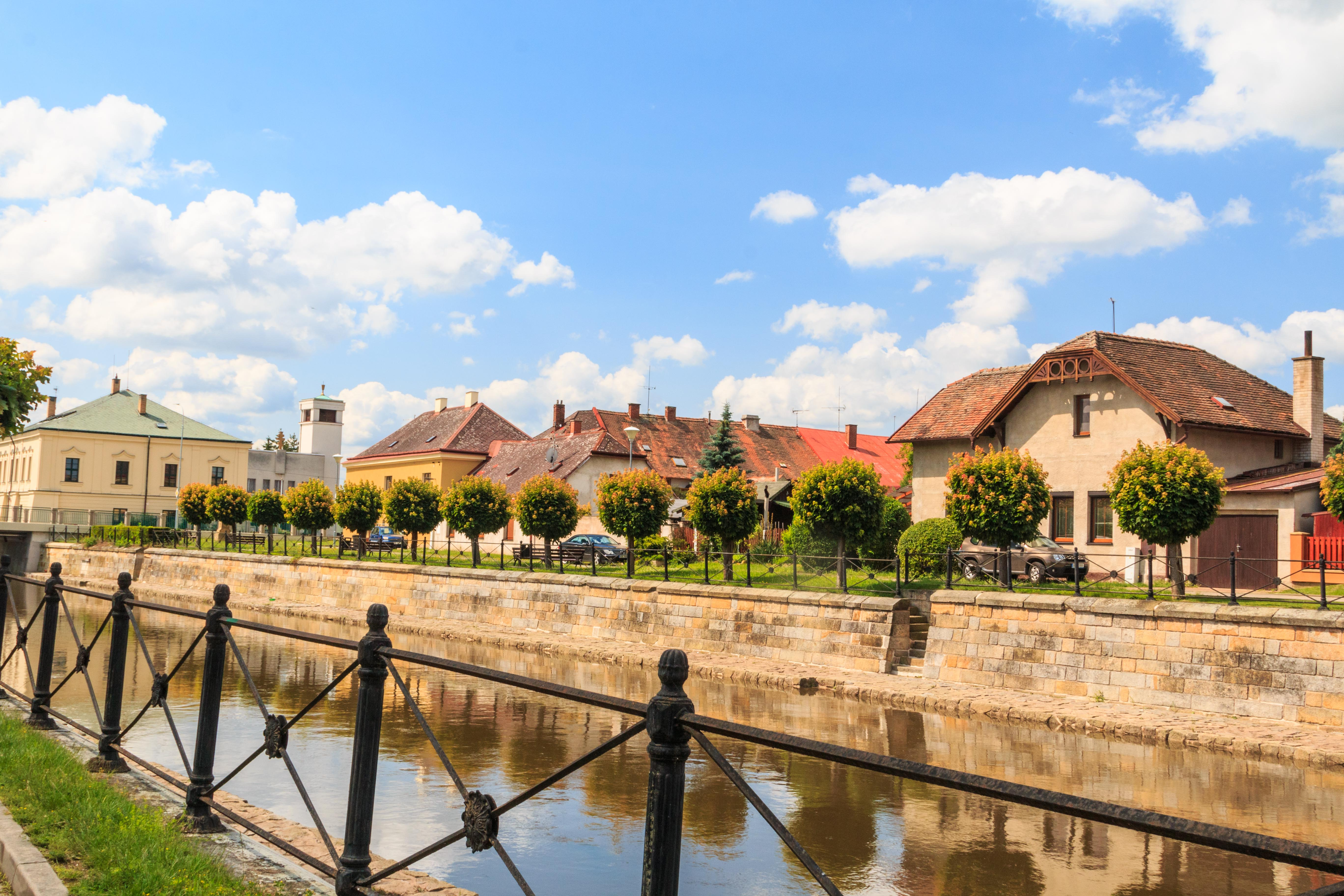
The Cidlina in Chlumec nad Cidlinou

Chlumec nad Cidlinou is located about 26 kilometres (16 mi) west of Hradec Králové. It lies in a flat landscape in the East Elbe Table. The highest point is at 254 m (833 ft) above sea level. The town is situated at the confluence of the Cidlina and Bystřice rivers. There are several fishponds in the municipal territory, especially north of the town. The largest of them is Chlumecký rybník.

The nearest neighbourhood is surrounded by gardens and after it the town is sometimes nicknamed "Town in gardens".

== History ==
The first written mention of Chlumec is from 1235 in a deed of King Wenceslaus I. It was located on a trade route from Prague to Kłodzko Land. The village of Lučice, part of Chlumec nad Cidlinou, was first mentioned in 1110.

The Sternberg family owned Chlumec until 1393. During the first half of the 15th century, it belonged to the lords of Bergov, who had built a water castle here. After it belonged to various nobles and changed owners several times, it was acquired by the Pernštejn family in 1521. During their rule, the estate grew significantly and prospered. The castle was fortified and the new Church of Saint Ursula was built. In these times Chlumec was promoted to a town. In 1547, the Chlumec estate was bought by the royal chamber.

From 1611, Chlumec belonged to the Kinsky family. During the Thirty Years' War, the town was conquered and looted repeatedly. It was badly damaged and the castle was destroyed. After several fires, the castle was not renewed and new aristocratic residence was built – the Karlova Koruna Chateau. In the late 17th and early 18th centuries, the town recovered and crafts flourished.

The town developed rapidly before World War I. Several public buildings were built, including the impressive Neo-Renaissance school.

== Demographics ==
Historical population

| Year | Pop. | ±% |
|---|---|---|
| 1869 | 3,916 | — |
| 1880 | 4,675 | +19.4% |
| 1890 | 4,599 | −1.6% |
| 1900 | 4,479 | −2.6% |
| 1910 | 5,135 | +14.6% |

| Year | Pop. | ±% |
|---|---|---|
| 1921 | 5,082 | −1.0% |
| 1930 | 5,183 | +2.0% |
| 1950 | 4,773 | −7.9% |
| 1961 | 5,196 | +8.9% |
| 1970 | 5,199 | +0.1% |

| Year | Pop. | ±% |
|---|---|---|
| 1980 | 5,346 | +2.8% |
| 1991 | 5,327 | −0.4% |
| 2001 | 5,252 | −1.4% |
| 2011 | 5,370 | +2.2% |
| 2021 | 5,552 | +3.4% |

Source: Censuses

== Transport ==
The D11 motorway runs south of the town.

Chlumec nad Cidlinou is located on the interregional railway line Prague–Trutnov. It is also the starting point of the lines to Hradec Králové and to Městec Králové.

== Sights ==
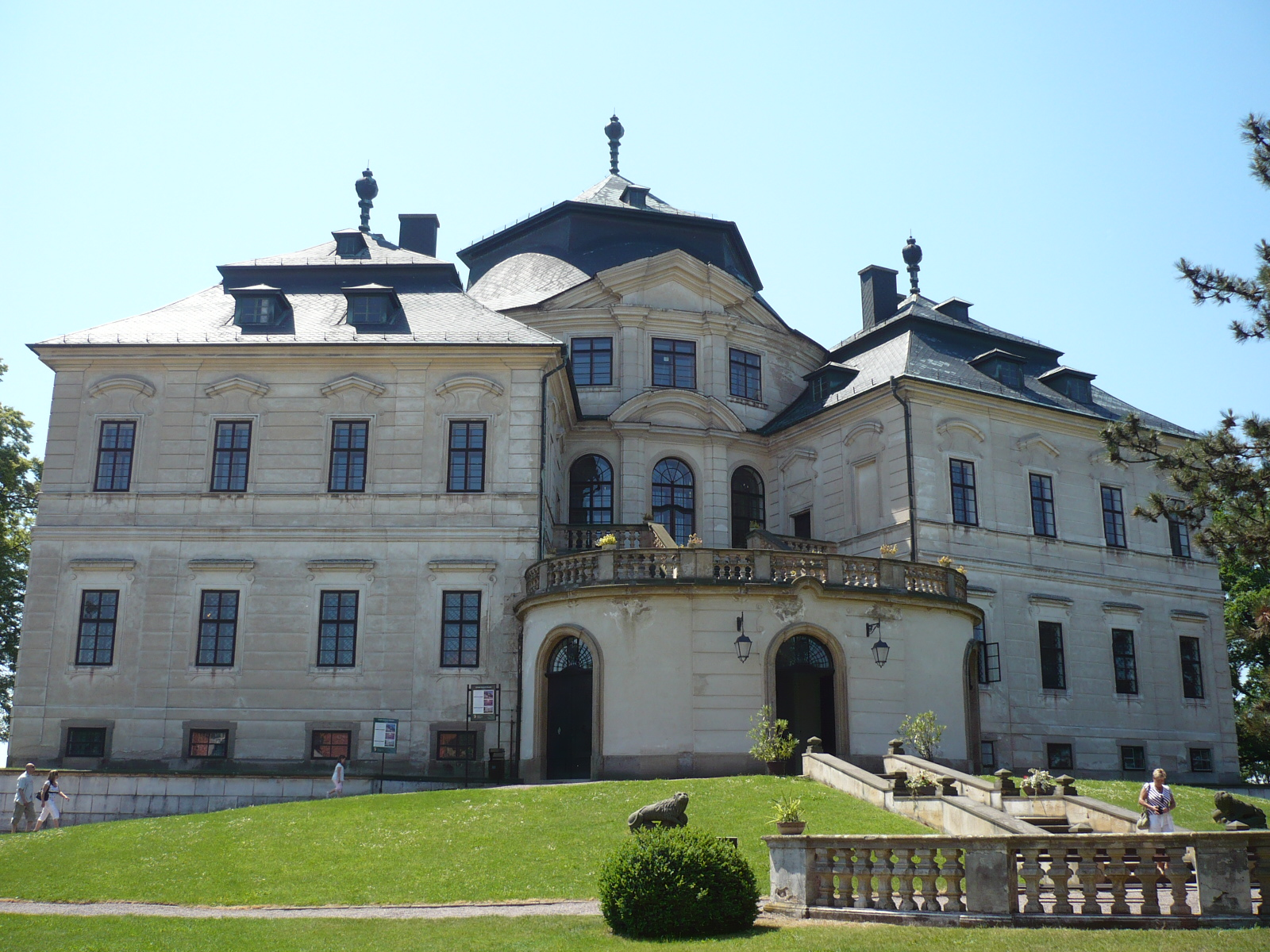
Karlova Koruna Chateau

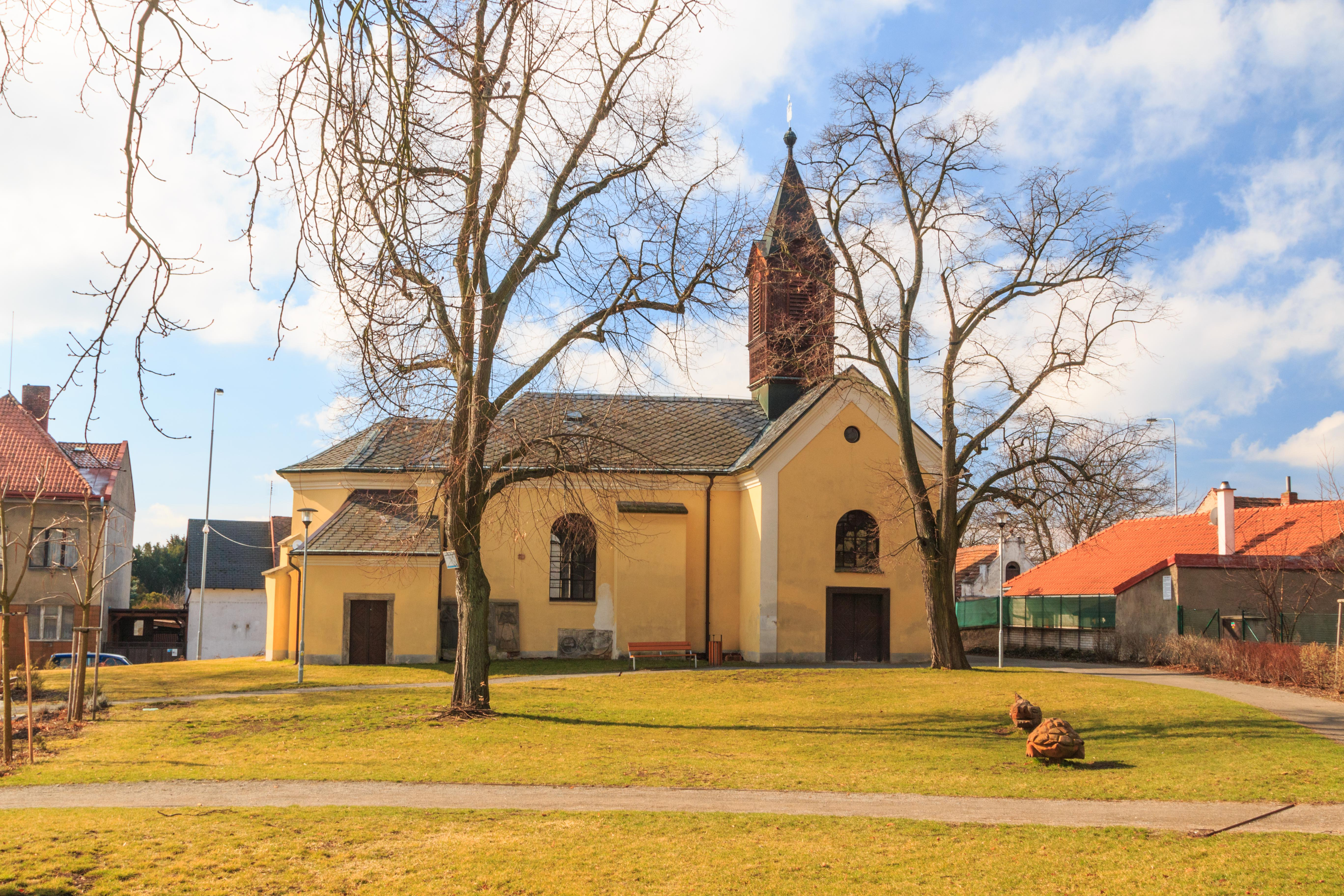
Church of the Holy Trinity

The main landmark of the town is the Karlova Koruna Chateau. It was built for František Ferdinand Kinsky in 1721–1723 with the basic architectural design drafted by Jan Santini Aichel and with the participation in the building process of František Maxmilián Kaňka. The castle is surrounded by a castle park. The castle chapel in the park is dedicated to Blessed Virgin Mary and was built in 1741–1745.

The Church of the Holy Trinity is the oldest monument in the town. According to the foundation stone, it was built in 1134. The first written mention is from 1358. Until the early 20th century, it was a cemetery church. The building has a flat ceiling with a triangular presbytery and a wooden prismatic tower. An interior figuration came from the 17th century. Around outer presbytery walls there are placed Empire tombs from around 1800. The church was rebuilt many times and today it is considered a styleless construction. The Zubatovská Chapel is a Neoclassical chapel from 1836–1842 is located in the former cemetery, which is today a municipal park.

The Church of Saint Ursula was built in 1536–1543. It mixes the late Gothic and Renaissance styles. Today's appearance is the result of repairs after three fires in the 17th century. The interior is in the Rococo style after the fire in 1774.

== Notable people ==
- Václav Kliment Klicpera (1792–1859), playwright
- Josef Rumler (1922–1999), poet, literary critic, historian and translator
- Mario Klemens (1936–2025), conductor
- Ivana Loudová (1941–2017), composer
- Helena Válková (born 1951), politician, professor and lawyer
- Oldřich Dědek (born 1953), economist
- Ladislav Vízek (born 1955), footballer
- Miroslav Ouzký (born 1958), physician, politician
- Miroslav Poche (born 1978), politician and economist
- Václav Pilař (born 1988), footballer

== Twin towns – sister cities ==
Chlumec nad Cidlinou is twinned with:

- Valaská, Slovakia
