= Rtyně v Podkrkonoší =

- Town
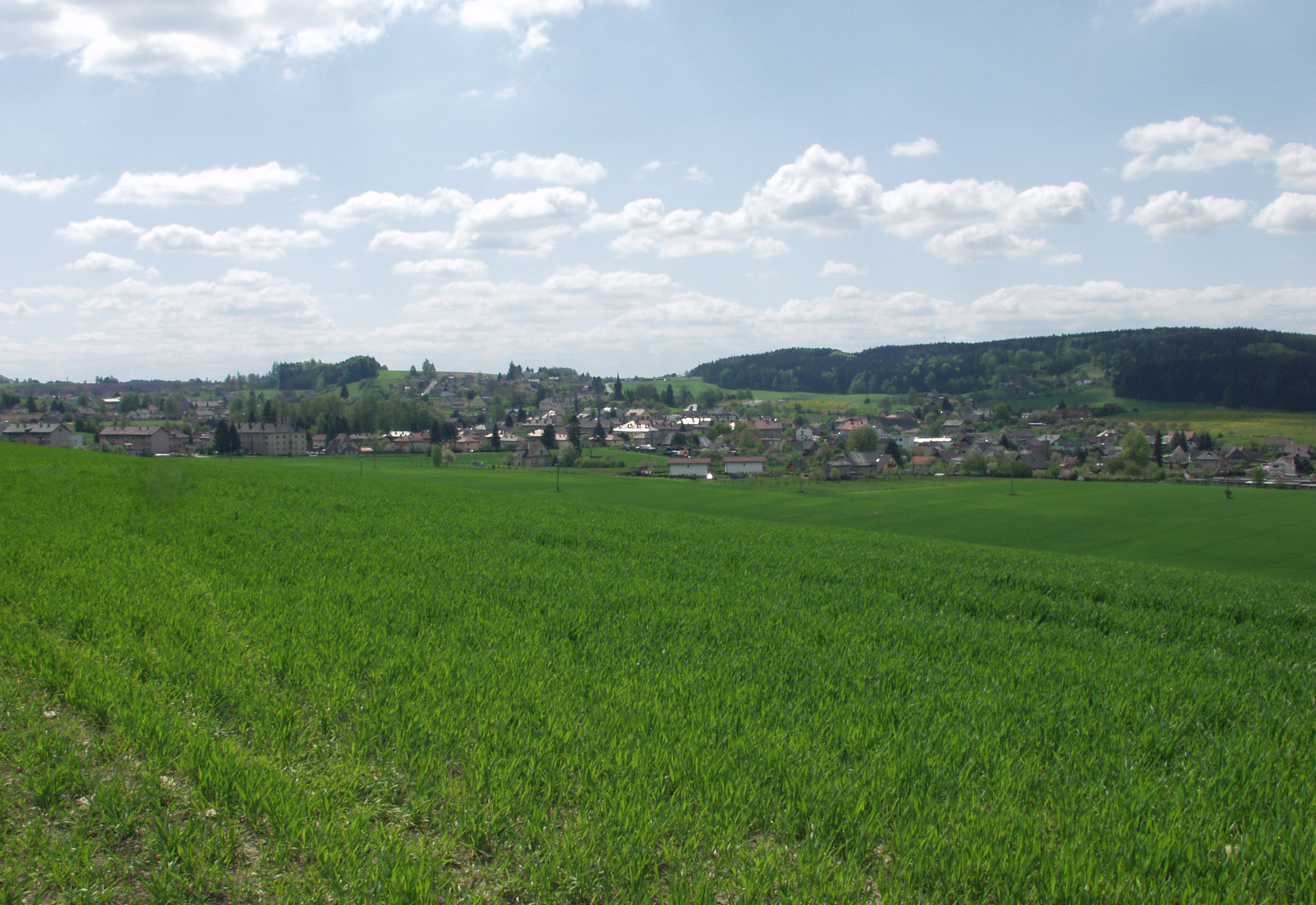
- Panorama of Rtyně v Podkrkonoší

- Flag Coat of arms

- Location in the Czech Republic
- Coordinates: 50°30′19″N 16°4′19″E
- Country: Czech Republic
- Region: Hradec Králové
- District: Trutnov
- First mentioned: 1367

Government
  - Mayor: Karel Šafář

Area
  - Total: 13.89 km^{2} (5.36 sq mi)
- Elevation: 405 m (1,329 ft)

Population (2026-01-01)
  - Total: 2,841
  - Density: 204.5/km^{2} (529.7/sq mi)
- Time zone: UTC+1 (CET)
  - Summer (DST): UTC+2 (CEST)
- Postal code: 542 33
- Website: www.rtyne.cz

Rtyně v Podkrkonoší (Czech pronunciation: [ˈrtɪɲɛ ˈv potkr̩konoʃiː]; German: Hertin) is a town in Trutnov District in the Hradec Králové Region of the Czech Republic. It has about 2,800 inhabitants.

== Etymology ==
The name Rtyně is derived from the Czech word rty ('lips', in Old Czech also 'mouth'). There is a theory that Rtyně was originally the name of the local stream, transferred to the settlement.

== Geography ==
Rtyně v Podkrkonoší is located about 13 kilometres (8 mi) southeast of Trutnov and 36 km (22 mi) northeast of Hradec Králové. It lies on the border between the Giant Mountains Foothills and Broumov Highlands. The highest point is a hill at 642 m (2,106 ft) above sea level. The Rtyňka Stream flows through the town.

== History ==
Rtyně was probably founded in the late 13th century. The first written mention of Rtyně is from 1367 when it used to be one of the largest agricultural communities in the region. The way of living changed a lot in the 16th century when coal mining in this region started, although the agriculture did not lose its importance. Coal was mined in Rtyně from 1590 to 1990.

Peasants used to keep an important position in Rtyně, which was proved by a peasant uprising in 1775. In 1931, the name of the municipality was changed to Rtyně v Podkrkonoší. In 1978, it gained town status.

== Demographics ==
Historical population

Year	Pop.	±%
1869	2,159	—
1880	2,500	+15.8%
1890	2,695	+7.8%
1900	2,706	+0.4%
1910	2,800	+3.5%

Year	Pop.	±%
1921	2,655	−5.2%
1930	2,648	−0.3%
1950	2,699	+1.9%
1961	3,187	+18.1%
1970	3,270	+2.6%

Year	Pop.	±%
1980	3,158	−3.4%
1991	3,076	−2.6%
2001	3,053	−0.7%
2011	3,027	−0.9%
2021	2,876	−5.0%

Source: Censuses

== Economy ==
The largest employer based in the town is Joyson Safety Systems, a manufacturer of automotive safety systems. It employs more than 100 people.

== Transport ==
The I/14 road (the section from Trutnov to Náchod) runs through the town.

Rtyně v Podkrkonoší is located on the railway line Prague–Trutnov.

== Culture ==
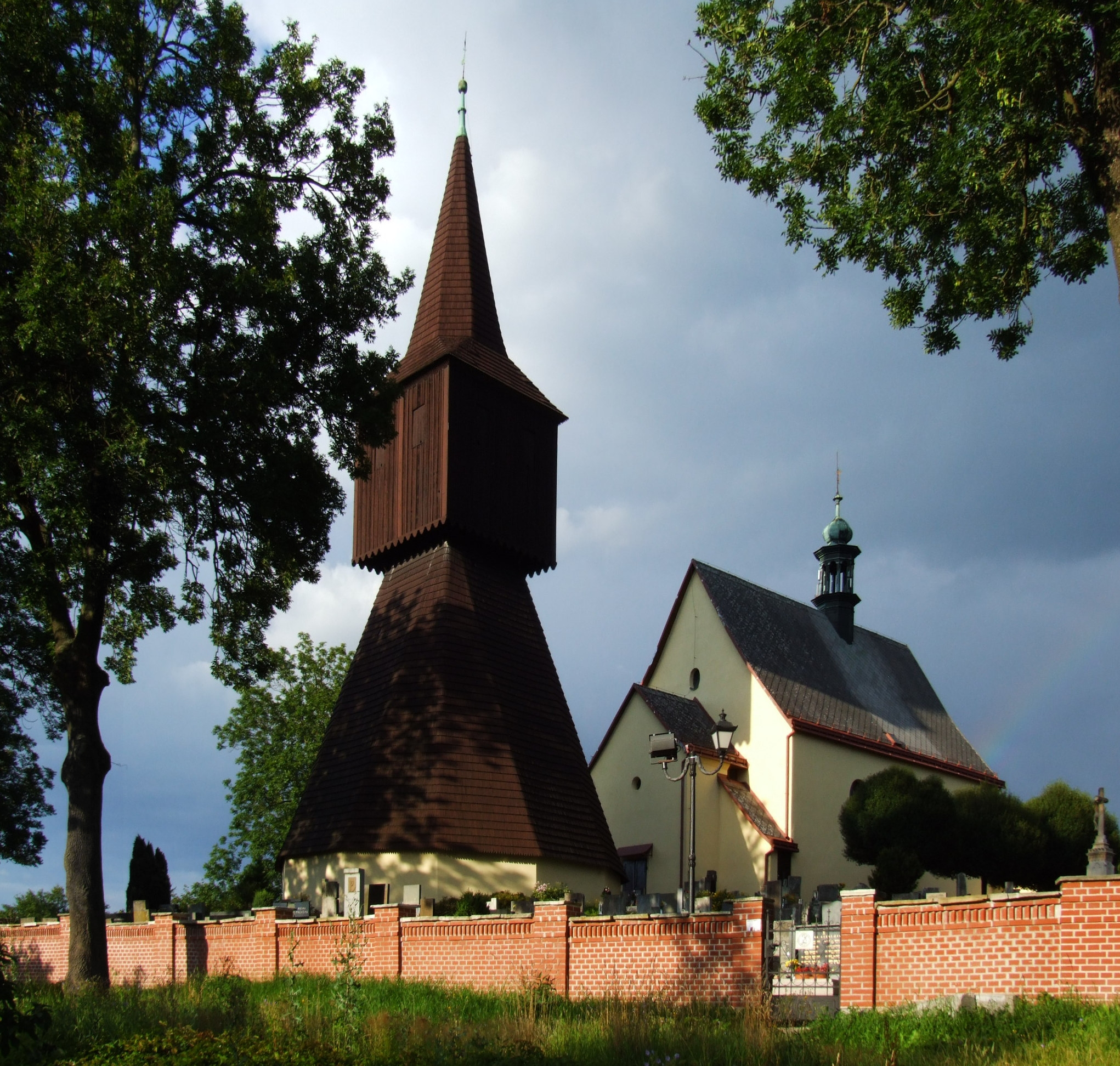
Church of Saint John the Baptist with the bell tower

Since 1962, the town hosts an annual concert band festival. The town is also the seat of the Koletova hornická hudba Concert Band, which was founded in 1864 and is the host band for the annual band festival.

== Sights ==
The most valuable building and symbol of the town is a wooden bell tower from 1592. It is located next to the Church of Saint John the Baptist and is unique in shape and construction. In front of the church stands a statue of King David by Matthias Braun. Due to poor condition, the original from 1738 was replaced by a copy.

Coal mining and the peasant uprising are remembered in the exposition of the town museum.

== Twin towns – sister cities ==
Rtyně v Podkrkonoší is twinned with:

- Elstra, Germany
- Jelcz-Laskowice, Poland
