= Serfdom Patent (1781) =

Proclamation of the Habsburg monarchy

The Serfdom Patent of 1 November 1781 aimed to abolish aspects of the traditional serfdom (German: Leibeigenschaft) system of the Habsburg monarchy through the establishment of basic civil liberties for the serfs.

The feudal system bound farmers to inherited pieces of land and subjected them to the absolute control of their landlord. The landlord was obligated to provide protection, in exchange for the serfs' labor and goods. The Serfdom Patent, issued by the enlightened absolutist Emperor Joseph II, diminished the long-established mastery of the landlords; thus allowing the serfs to independently choose marriage partners, pursue career choices, and move between estates.

== Historical context ==
The Holy Roman Emperor Joseph II ruled as co-regent of the Habsburg monarchy with his mother, Maria Theresa, from 1765 to 1780. The empress's July Decree of 1770 granted the peasants the right to justice through royal officials rather than their lords' courts. The Patent of 1772 even granted them the right to appeal to the sovereign, and limited the robot (labour that lords could demand of their serfs) to three days a week and twelve hours a day. The October Decree of 1773 capped the price of letters of release, which serfs could buy from their lords to gain their freedom.

Following her death in 1780, Joseph II pursued further liberal reforms. His policies included the 1781 Edict of Toleration, in which the Catholic Emperor granted Protestant denominations more equality than in the past. This represented a tremendous change from the Catholic-centered policies of his mother. Joseph was an enlightened absolutist ruler, incorporating reason and Enlightenment ideals into his administration. Emperor Joseph's enlightened despot contemporaries, Catherine the Great of Russia and Frederick the Great of Prussia, both claimed to detest feudalism yet chose to appease their noble classes by strengthening the serfdom system during their years in power. Author T. K. E. Blemming describes the rulers' compromises, arguing that "in exchange for absolute power at a national level it was necessary to hand over to them [nobles] absolute power on their estates." Joseph refused to give in to the nobles' demands, which would soon create difficulties in the implementation of his decrees.

== The motivations of Joseph II ==
Much of the Habsburg economy was based on agriculture in the 18th century. The nobles and clerics were traditionally exempt from taxes, and the burden fell mainly on the peasants. After paying dues to the landlord, the serfs were unable to create high tax revenues for Joseph's centralized state. The Emperor recognized that the abolishment of the feudal system would allow peasants to pay higher tax rates to the state. Joseph's primary objection to feudalism was economic, but his moral objections also arose from witnessing the "inhumanity of serfdom". He abolished beatings and hoped to allow serfs to appeal court rulings to the throne following a reorganization of the landlord judicial system.

== Consequences of the Serfdom Patent ==
The Patent was enforced differently amongst all of the various Habsburg lands. The nobility in Bohemia refused to enact its provisions, while the Transylvanian nobles simply refused to notify the peasants in their region about this emancipation document. The Hungarian estates claimed that their peasants were not serfs, but "tenants in fee simple, who were fully informed as to their rights and duties by precise contracts" and continued to restrict these "tenants". In contrast, the peasants of the German-speaking provinces were actually aided by the Patent. The 1781 Serfdom Patent allowed the serfs legal rights in the Habsburg monarchy, but the document did not affect the financial dues and the physical corvée (unpaid labor) that the serfs legally owed to their landlords. Joseph II recognized the importance of these further reforms, continually attempting to destroy the economic subjugation through related laws, such as his Tax Decree of 1789. This new law would have finally realized Emperor Joseph II's ambition to modernize Habsburg society, allowing for the end of corvée and the beginning of lesser tax obligations. Joseph's latter reforms were withdrawn upon his death, but the personal freedom of serfs remained guaranteed through the first half of the nineteenth century due to the consequences of the 1781 Serfdom Patent.
