= Hvozdnice =

Hvozdnice may refer to places in the Czech Republic:

- Hvozdnice (Hradec Králové District), a municipality and village in the Hradec Králové Region
- Hvozdnice (Prague-West District), a municipality and village in the Central Bohemian Region
