= Hvozdnice (Hradec Králové District) =

- Municipality
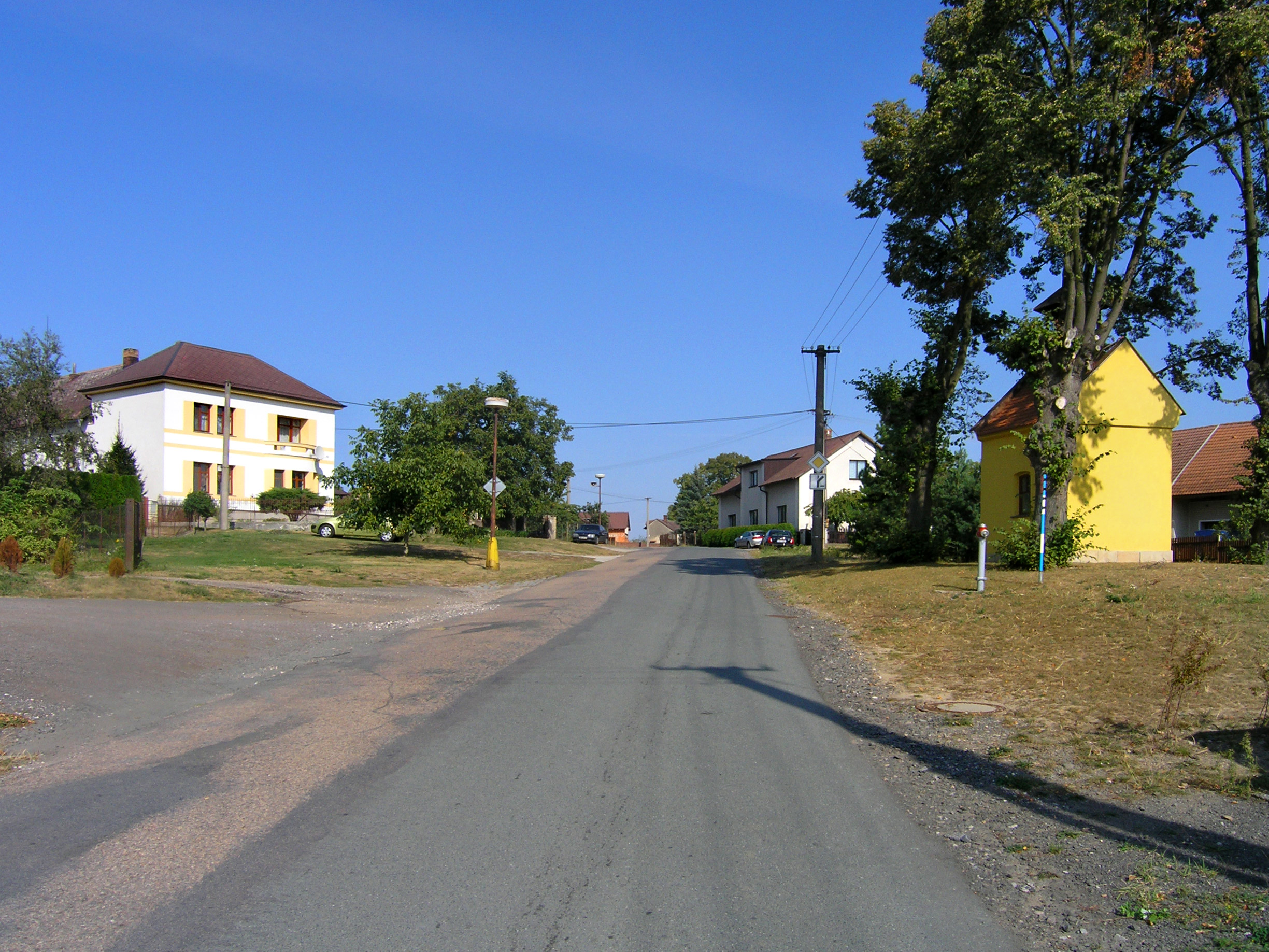
- Western part of Hvozdnice

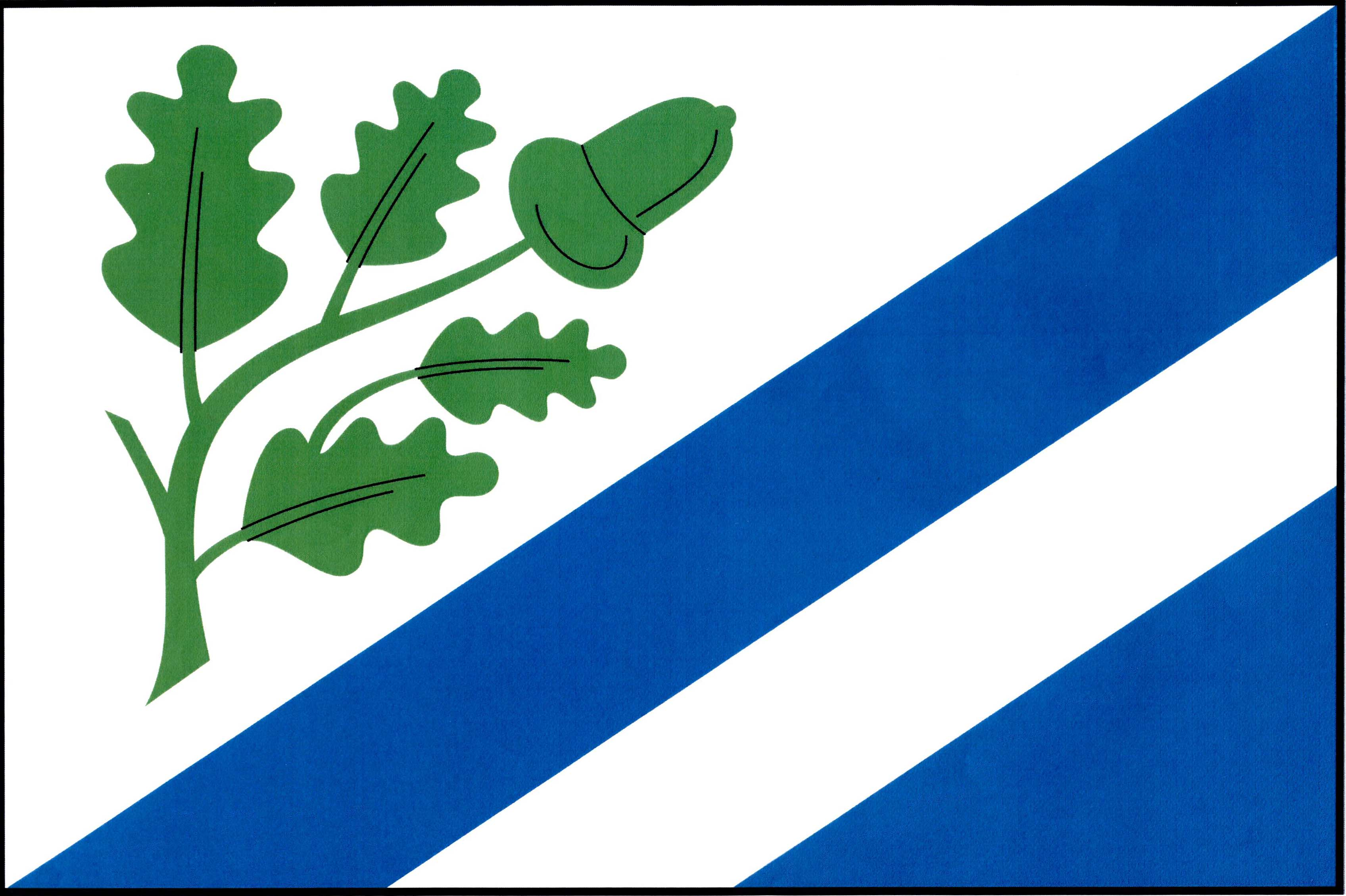
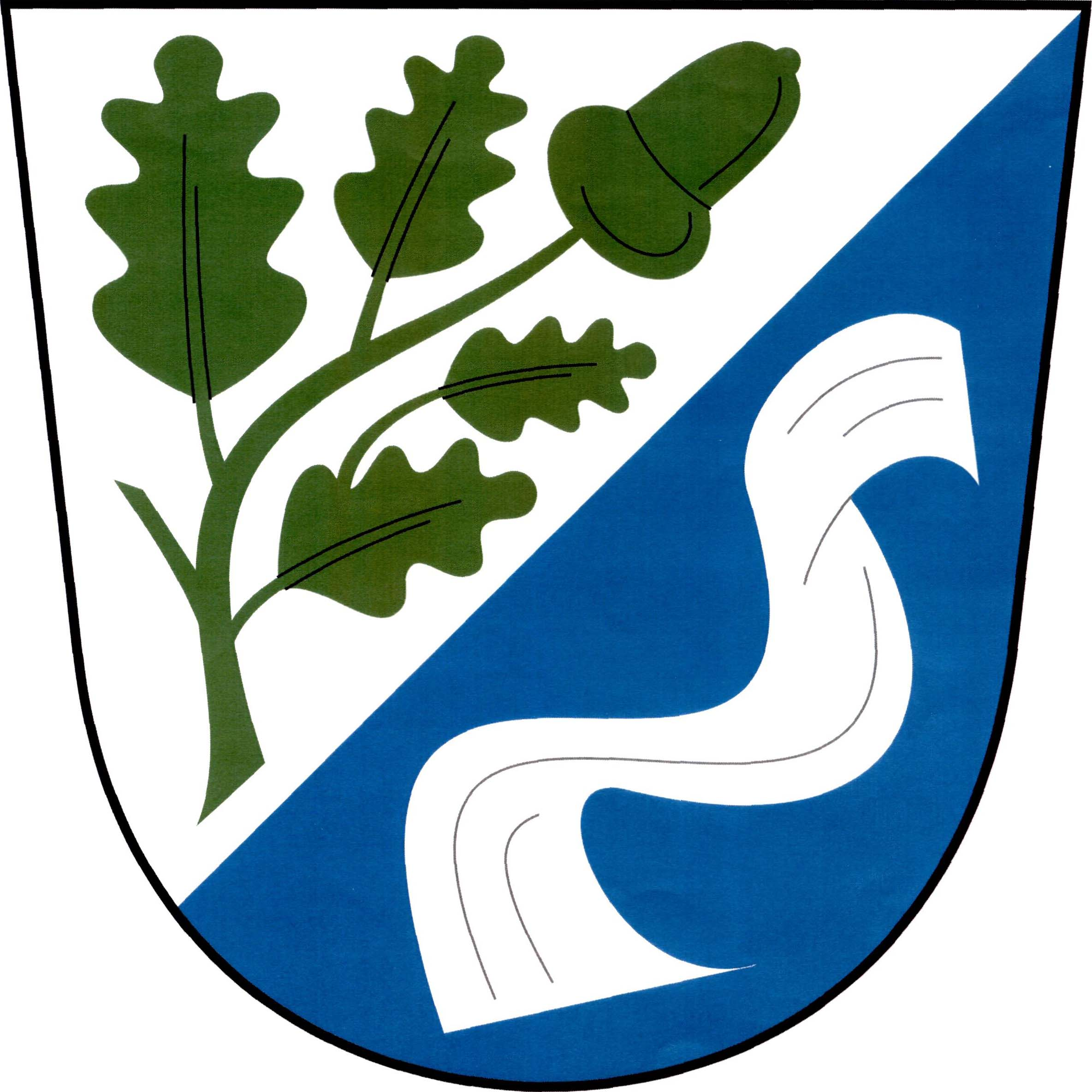
- Flag Coat of arms

- Location in the Czech Republic
- Coordinates: 50°11′29″N 15°42′41″E
- Country: Czech Republic
- Region: Hradec Králové
- District: Hradec Králové
- First mentioned: 1073

Area
  - Total: 2.15 km^{2} (0.83 sq mi)
- Elevation: 276 m (906 ft)

Population (2026-01-01)
  - Total: 352
  - Density: 164/km^{2} (424/sq mi)
- Time zone: UTC+1 (CET)
  - Summer (DST): UTC+2 (CEST)
- Postal code: 503 27
- Website: www.hvozdnice.cz

Hvozdnice is a municipality and village in Hradec Králové District in the Hradec Králové Region of the Czech Republic. It has about 400 inhabitants.

== History ==
The first written mention of Hvozdnice is from 1073.

== Demographics ==
Historical population
Year	Pop.	±%
1869	222	—
1880	235	+5.9%
1890	211	−10.2%
1900	197	−6.6%
1910	200	+1.5%
1921	219	+9.5%
1930	239	+9.1%
1950	180	−24.7%
1961	192	+6.7%
1970	189	−1.6%
1980	163	−13.8%
1991	197	+20.9%
2001	182	−7.6%
2011	209	+14.8%
2021	259	+23.9%
Source: Censuses
