= Butoves =

- Municipality
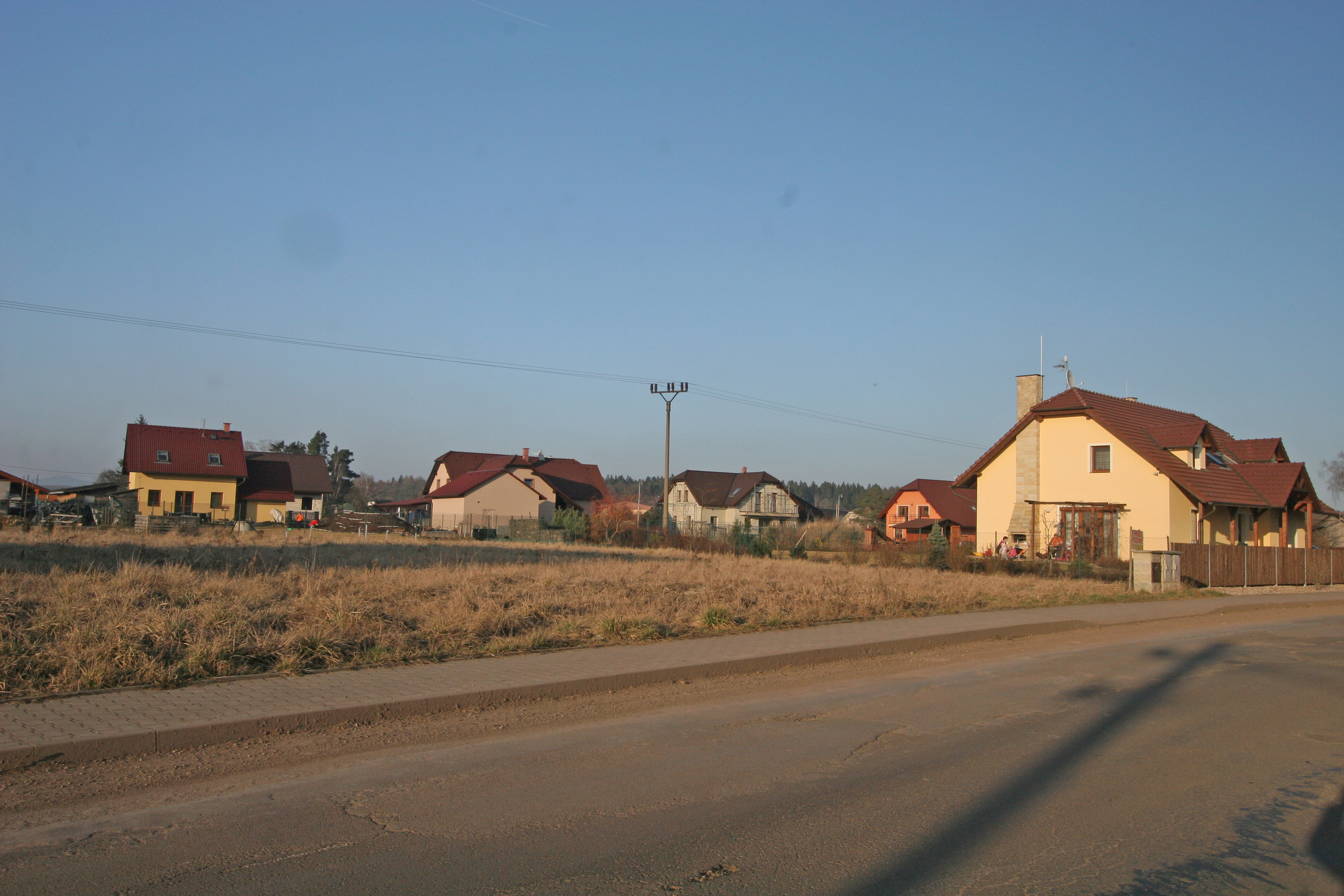
- New houses in Butoves

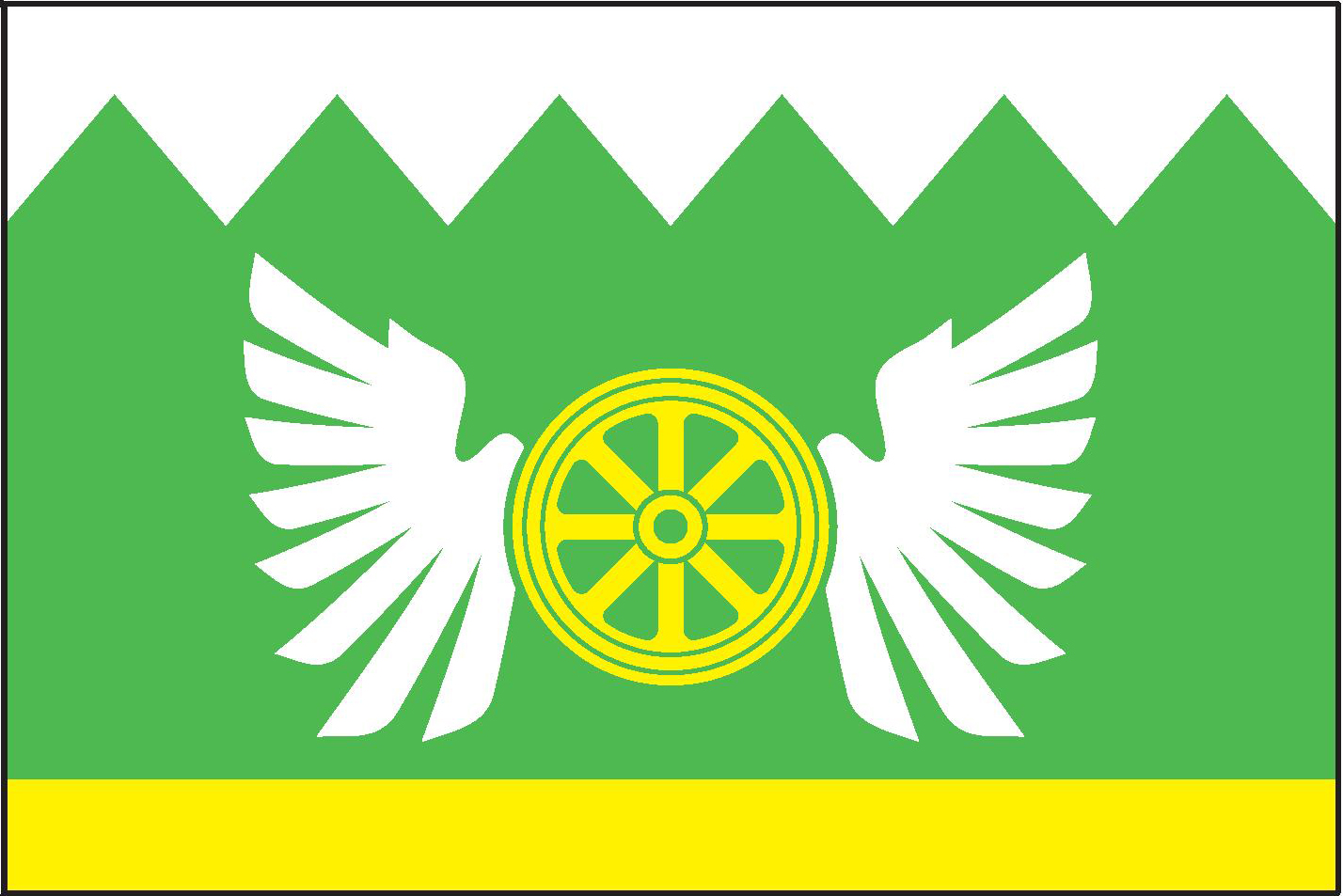
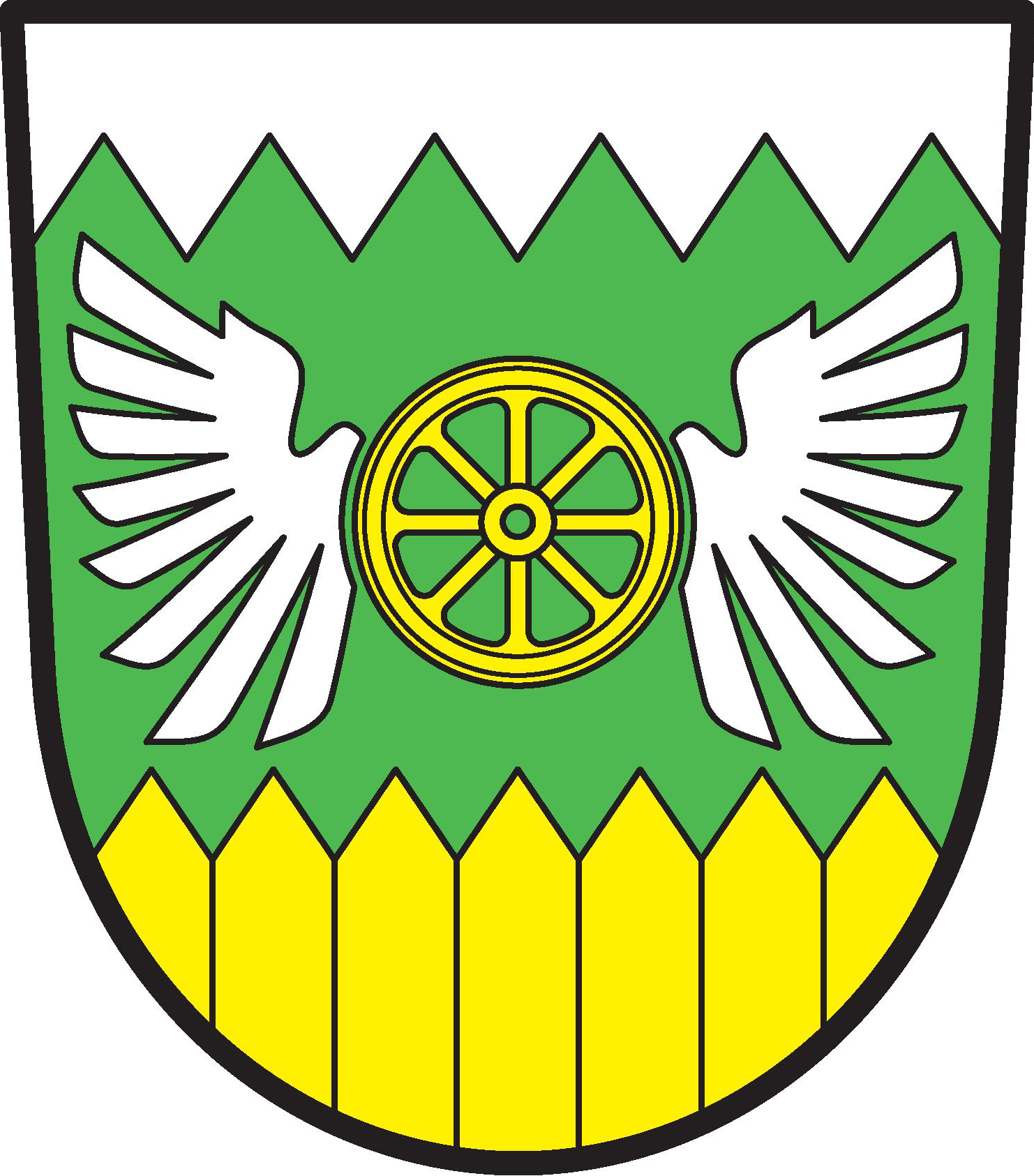
- Flag Coat of arms

- Location in the Czech Republic
- Coordinates: 50°23′11″N 15°25′39″E
- Country: Czech Republic
- Region: Hradec Králové
- District: Jičín
- First mentioned: 1329

Area
  - Total: 1.67 km^{2} (0.64 sq mi)
- Elevation: 260 m (850 ft)

Population (2026-01-01)
  - Total: 296
  - Density: 177/km^{2} (459/sq mi)
- Time zone: UTC+1 (CET)
  - Summer (DST): UTC+2 (CEST)
- Postal code: 506 01
- Website: www.butoves.cz

Butoves is a municipality and village in Jičín District in the Hradec Králové Region of the Czech Republic. It has about 300 inhabitants.

== Demographics ==
Historical population
Year	Pop.	±%
1869	172	—
1880	204	+18.6%
1890	210	+2.9%
1900	203	−3.3%
1910	218	+7.4%
1921	228	+4.6%
1930	206	−9.6%
1950	192	−6.8%
1961	182	−5.2%
1970	181	−0.5%
1980	138	−23.8%
1991	73	−47.1%
2001	172	+135.6%
2011	244	+41.9%
2021	253	+3.7%
Source: Censuses
