= Třtěnice =

- Municipality
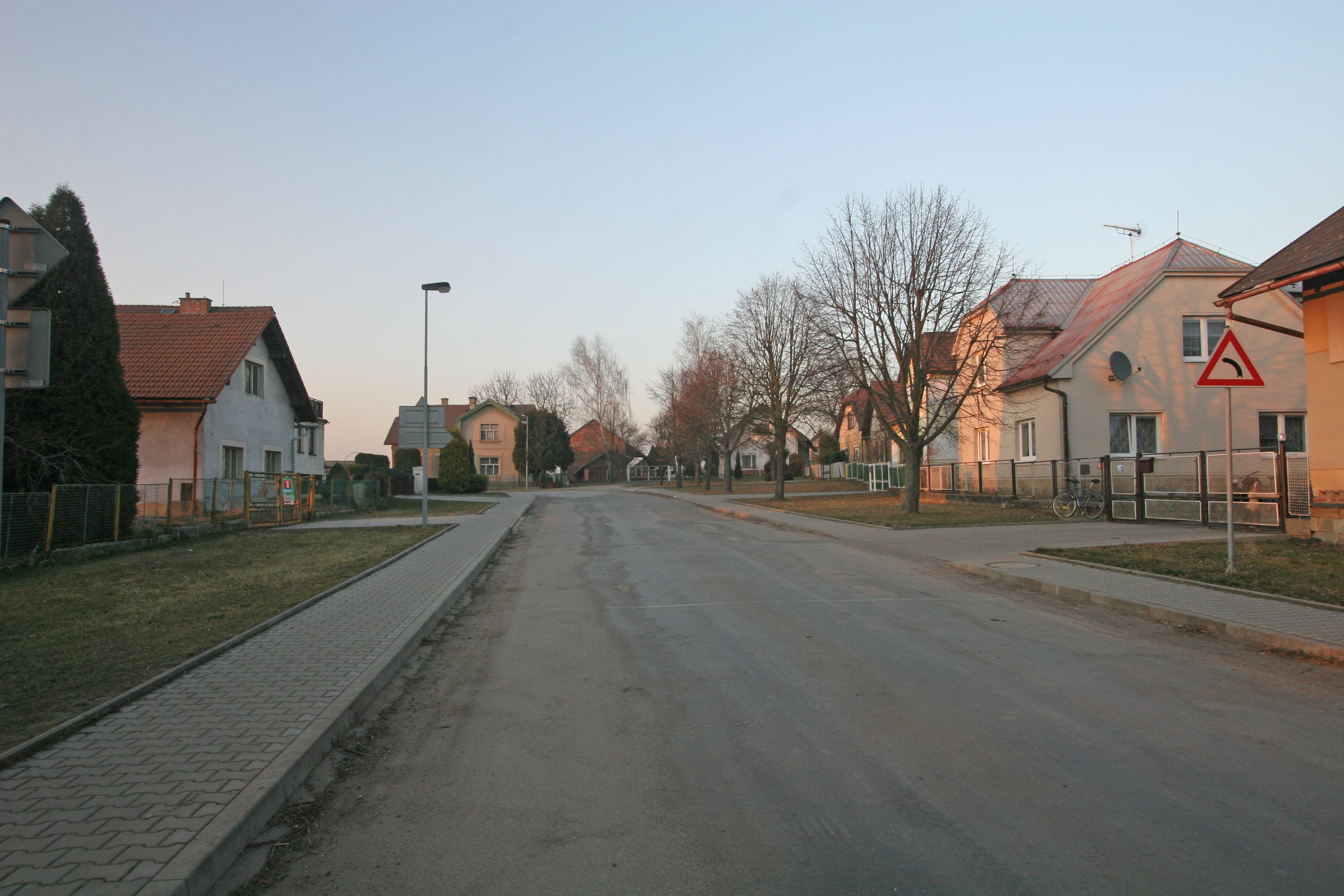
- Road through Třtěnice

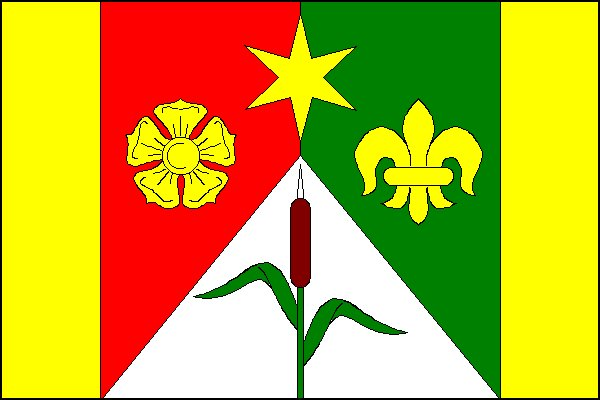
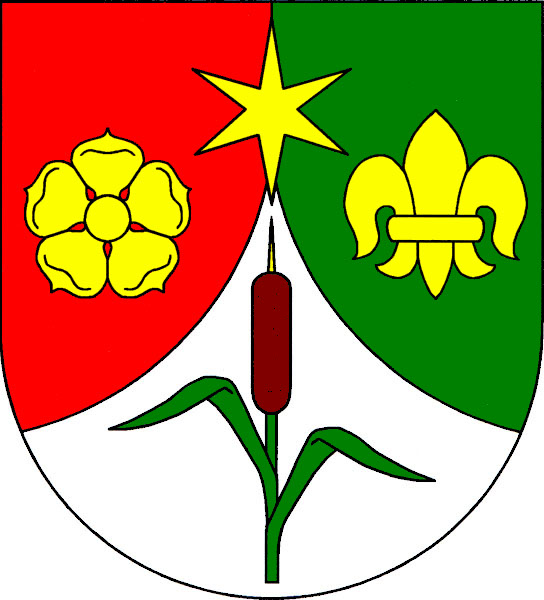
- Flag Coat of arms

- Location in the Czech Republic
- Coordinates: 50°22′39″N 15°28′9″E
- Country: Czech Republic
- Region: Hradec Králové
- District: Jičín
- First mentioned: 1391

Area
  - Total: 5.60 km^{2} (2.16 sq mi)
- Elevation: 253 m (830 ft)

Population (2026-01-01)
  - Total: 345
  - Density: 61.6/km^{2} (160/sq mi)
- Time zone: UTC+1 (CET)
  - Summer (DST): UTC+2 (CEST)
- Postal code: 507 04
- Website: www.trtenice.cz

Třtěnice is a municipality and village in Jičín District in the Hradec Králové Region of the Czech Republic. It has about 300 inhabitants.

== Demographics ==
Historical population
| Year | Pop. | ±% |
|---|---|---|
| 1869 | 476 | — |
| 1880 | 528 | +10.9% |
| 1890 | 520 | −1.5% |
| 1900 | 512 | −1.5% |
| 1910 | 514 | +0.4% |
| 1921 | 505 | −1.8% |
| 1930 | 554 | +9.7% |
| 1950 | 383 | −30.9% |
| 1961 | 400 | +4.4% |
| 1970 | 370 | −7.5% |
| 1980 | 356 | −3.8% |
| 1991 | 332 | −6.7% |
| 2001 | 329 | −0.9% |
| 2011 | 329 | +0.0% |
| 2021 | 334 | +1.5% |
Source: Censuses
