= Výrava (Hradec Králové District) =

- Municipality
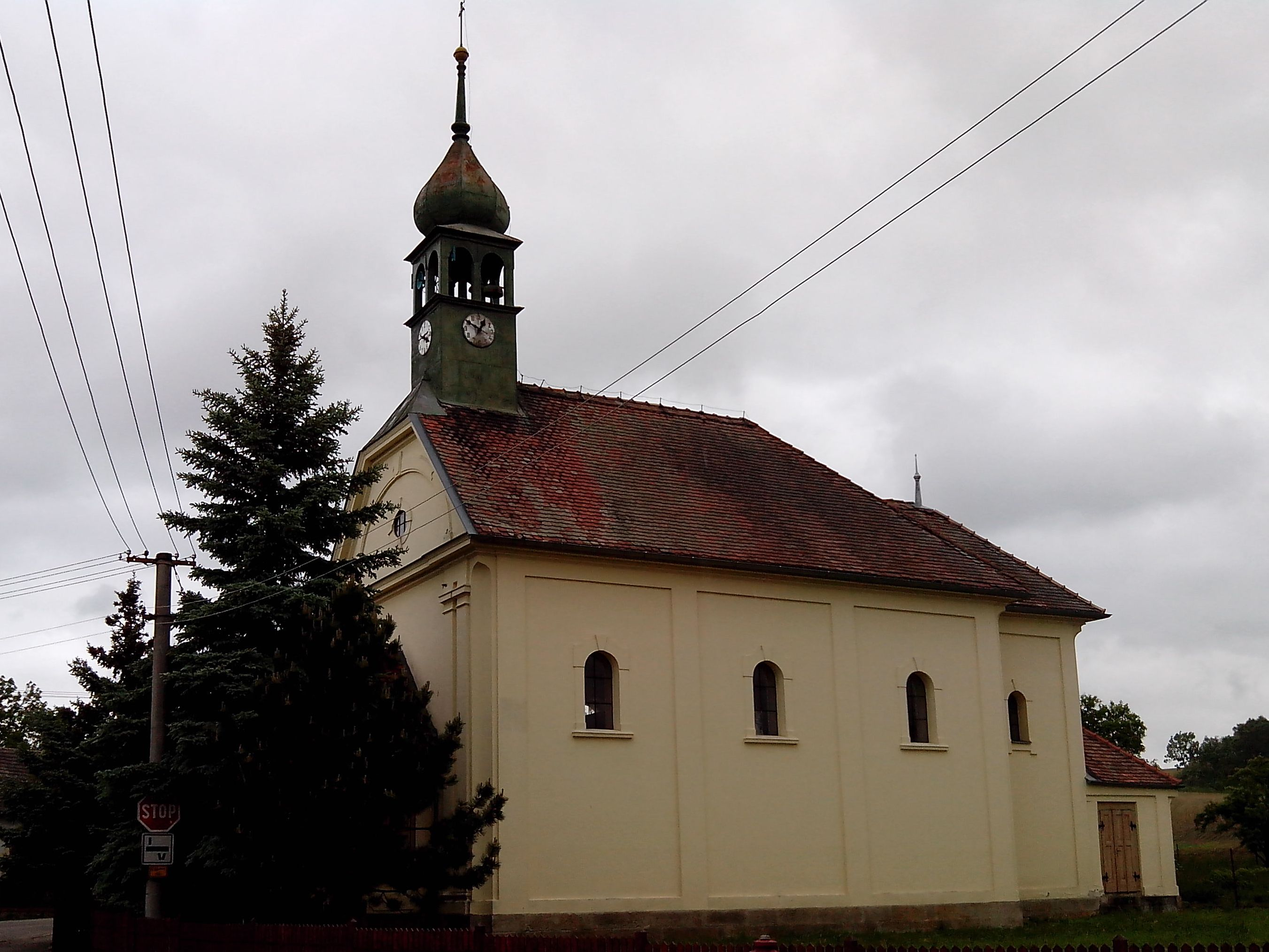
- Chapel of Saint John the Baptist

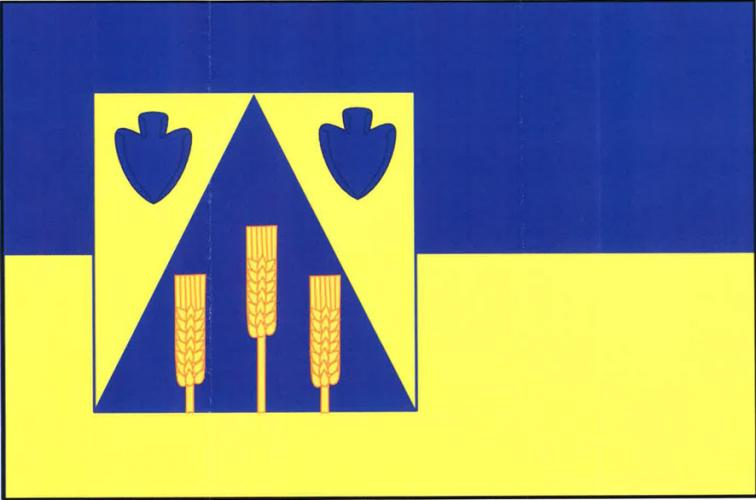
- Flag Coat of arms

- Location in the Czech Republic
- Coordinates: 50°16′11″N 15°58′44″E
- Country: Czech Republic
- Region: Hradec Králové
- District: Hradec Králové
- First mentioned: 1406

Area
  - Total: 8.45 km^{2} (3.26 sq mi)
- Elevation: 250 m (820 ft)

Population (2026-01-01)
  - Total: 447
  - Density: 52.9/km^{2} (137/sq mi)
- Time zone: UTC+1 (CET)
  - Summer (DST): UTC+2 (CEST)
- Postal code: 503 03
- Website: www.vyrava.cz

Výrava is a municipality and village in Hradec Králové District in the Hradec Králové Region of the Czech Republic. It has about 400 inhabitants.

== Administrative division ==
Výrava consists of two municipal parts (in brackets population according to the 2021 census):

- Výrava (379)
- Dolní Černilov (39)

== Demographics ==
Historical population
Year	Pop.	±%
1869	777	—
1880	763	−1.8%
1890	788	+3.3%
1900	775	−1.6%
1910	729	−5.9%
1921	666	−8.6%
1930	678	+1.8%
1950	486	−28.3%
1961	492	+1.2%
1970	440	−10.6%
1980	384	−12.7%
1991	317	−17.4%
2001	300	−5.4%
2011	376	+25.3%
2021	418	+11.2%
Source: Censuses
