= Hradec Králové-Pardubice agglomeration =

Area of the Czech Republic

Hradec Králové-Pardubice agglomeration Hradecko-pardubická aglomerace
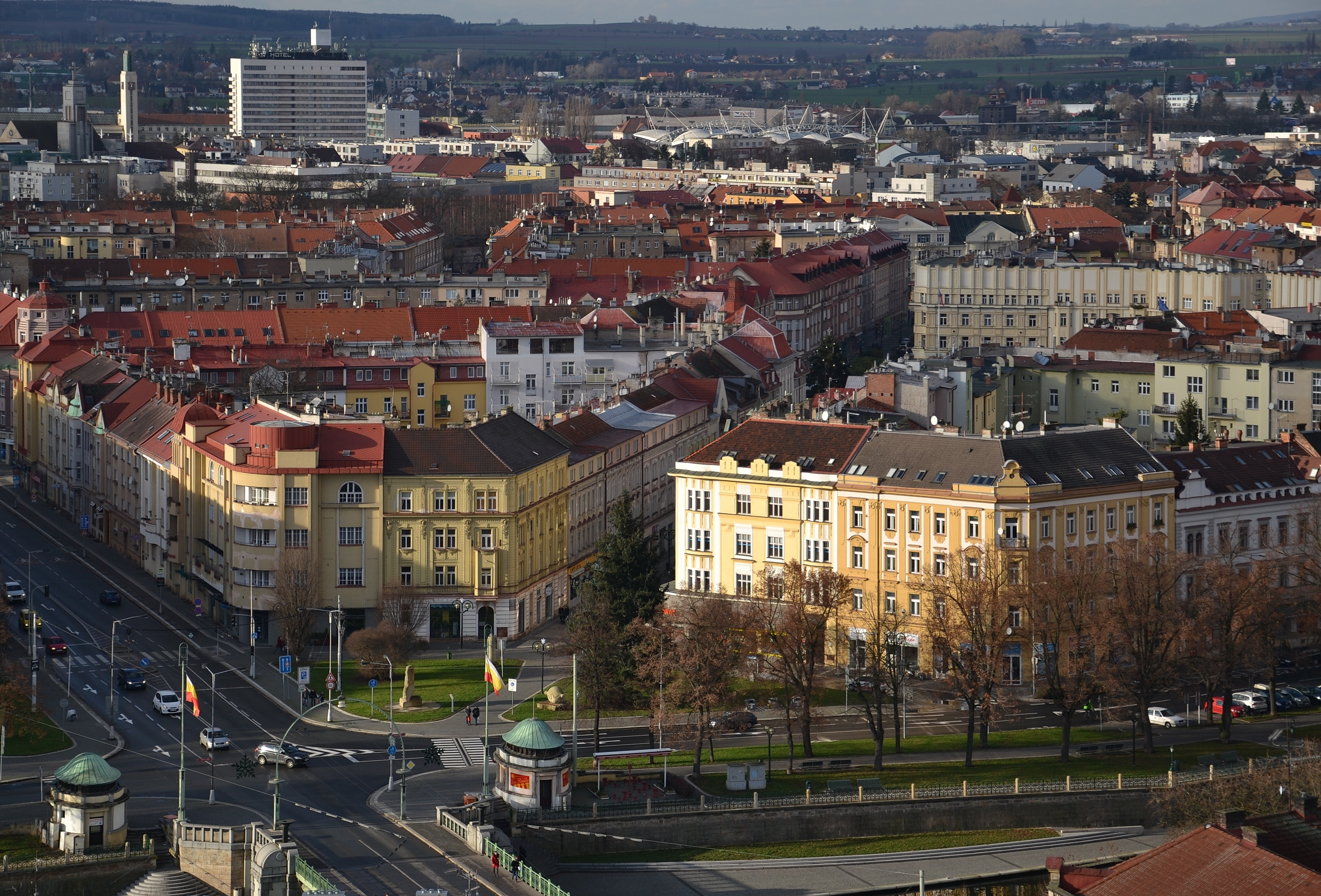
- View of Hradec Králové
- Country: Czech Republic
- Regions: Hradec Králové, Pardubice
- Largest cities: Hradec Králové, Pardubice

Area
  - Total: 1,308 km^{2} (505 sq mi)

Population (2024)
  - Total: 350,400
  - Density: 267.9/km^{2} (693.8/sq mi)
- Time zone: UTC+1 (CET)
  - Summer (DST): UTC+2 (CEST)

The Hradec Králové-Pardubice agglomeration (Czech: Hradecko-pardubická aglomerace) is the agglomeration of the cities of Hradec Králové and Pardubice and their surroundings in the Hradec Králové and Pardubice regions of the Czech Republic. It was defined in 2020 as a tool for drawing money from the European Structural and Investment Funds and is valid in 2021–2027. The agglomeration has a population of about 350,000.

== Definition ==
The Hradec Králové-Pardubice agglomeration was first defined in 2014 by the Ministry of Regional Development of the Czech Republic for the purposes of the Integrated Land Development Plans, which was a tool for drawing money from the European Structural and Investment Funds. The agglomeration comprised 145 municipalities with about 335,000 inhabitants and had an area of 1,163 km^{2} (449 sq mi).

The current Hradec Králové-Pardubice agglomeration was defined in 2020 by the Ministry of Regional Development for the purposes of the so-called Integrated Territorial Investment (ITI), which is a newer tool for drawing money from the European Structural and Investment Funds.

The territory was defined on the basis of a coefficient composed of three methods: integrated system of centres (i.e. delineation of commuting flows based on mobile operator data from 2019), time spent in core cities (based on mobile operator data from 2019) and residential suburbanization zones (based on statistics of realized housing construction and directional migration from the core of the agglomeration to suburban municipalities in the period 2009–2016). The scope of the territory is valid for the period 2021–2027.

== Municipalities ==
The agglomeration includes 152 municipalities.

Name	Population (2024)
Albrechtice	438
Babice	215
Barchov (Hradec Králové District)	294
Barchov (Pardubice District)	335
Běleč nad Orlicí	413
Blešno	445
Boharyně	602
Borek	279
Bukovina nad Labem	240
Bukovka	424
Bylany	468
Býšť	1,672
Časy	230
Čeperka	1,181
Čepí	474
Černá u Bohdanče	698
Černilov	2,475
Černožice	1,121
Choltice	1,244
Choteč	357
Chrtníky	111
Chrudim	23,441
Chvojenec	835
Čistěves	191
Dašice	2,642
Divec	277
Dobřenice	576
Dohalice	440
Dolany	440
Dolní Přím	748
Dolní Ředice	1,046
Dřenice	432
Dříteč	650
Dubany	331
Habřina	324
Heřmanův Městec	4,960
Holohlavy	927
Honbice	169
Hořiněves	716
Hradec Králové	93,906
Hrádek	183
Hrobice	269
Hvozdnice	332
Jaroměř	12,541
Jedousov	174
Jeníkovice	510
Jezbořice	389
Jílovice	310
Káranice	208
Klešice	434
Kobylice	257
Kočí	724
Kosičky	344
Kostěnice	574
Králova Lhota	266
Kratonohy	646
Křičeň	294
Kunčice	380
Kunětice	447
Lány	295
Lány u Dašic	171
Lázně Bohdaneč	3,494
Lejšovka	221
Lhota pod Libčany	1,050
Libčany	943
Libišany	665
Libníkovice	169
Librantice	654
Libřice	298
Lochenice	587
Lodín	427
Lužany	131
Máslojedy	220
Mikulovice	1,374
Mokrovousy	364
Morašice	794
Moravany	1,861
Mžany	446
Nabočany	124
Načešice	657
Neděliště	378
Nechanice	2,428
Němčice	839
Neratov	174
Obědovice	334
Opatovice nad Labem	2,837
Orel	806
Osice	556
Osičky	153
Ostřešany	1,122
Pardubice	92,362
Plch	103
Poběžovice u Přelouče	125
Podůlšany	157
Praskačka	1,132
Pravy	117
Předměřice nad Labem	1,938
Přelouč	10,137
Přelovice	222
Pšánky	71
Puchlovice	114
Ráby	586
Račice nad Trotinou	147
Radíkovice	203
Radostov	136
Rohovládova Bělá	642
Rohoznice	267
Rokytno	965
Roudnice	838
Rozhovice	312
Rybitví	1,461
Sadová	316
Sendražice	434
Sezemice	4,350
Skalice	670
Slatiňany	4,221
Smiřice	3,121
Smržov	540
Sobětuchy	993
Sovětice	229
Spojil	514
Srch	1,745
Srnojedy	787
Staré Hradiště	2,053
Staré Jesenčany	420
Staré Ždánice	728
Starý Mateřov	942
Stéblová	370
Stěžery	2,187
Stračov	317
Střezetice	376
Světí	346
Svojšice	284
Syrovátka	455
Těchlovice	404
Třebechovice pod Orebem	5,851
Třebosice	256
Třesovice	276
Třibřichy	286
Tuněchody	618
Týniště nad Orlicí	6,187
Úhřetice	503
Úhřetická Lhota	334
Újezd u Sezemic	253
Urbanice	307
Valy	516
Veselí	396
Všestary	1,804
Výrava	437
Vysoká nad Labem	1,803
Vysoký Újezd	102
Živanice	1,013
Total	350,400
