= PLCH =

PLCH may stand for:

- Plch, a municipality in the Czech Republic
- The Public Library of Cincinnati and Hamilton County, a public library system in Cincinnati, Ohio, United States
- Pulmonary Langerhans' cell histiocytosis, a type of interstitial lung disease
- Cassidy International Airport, an airport with the ICAO airport code PLCH
