= Libišany =

- Municipality
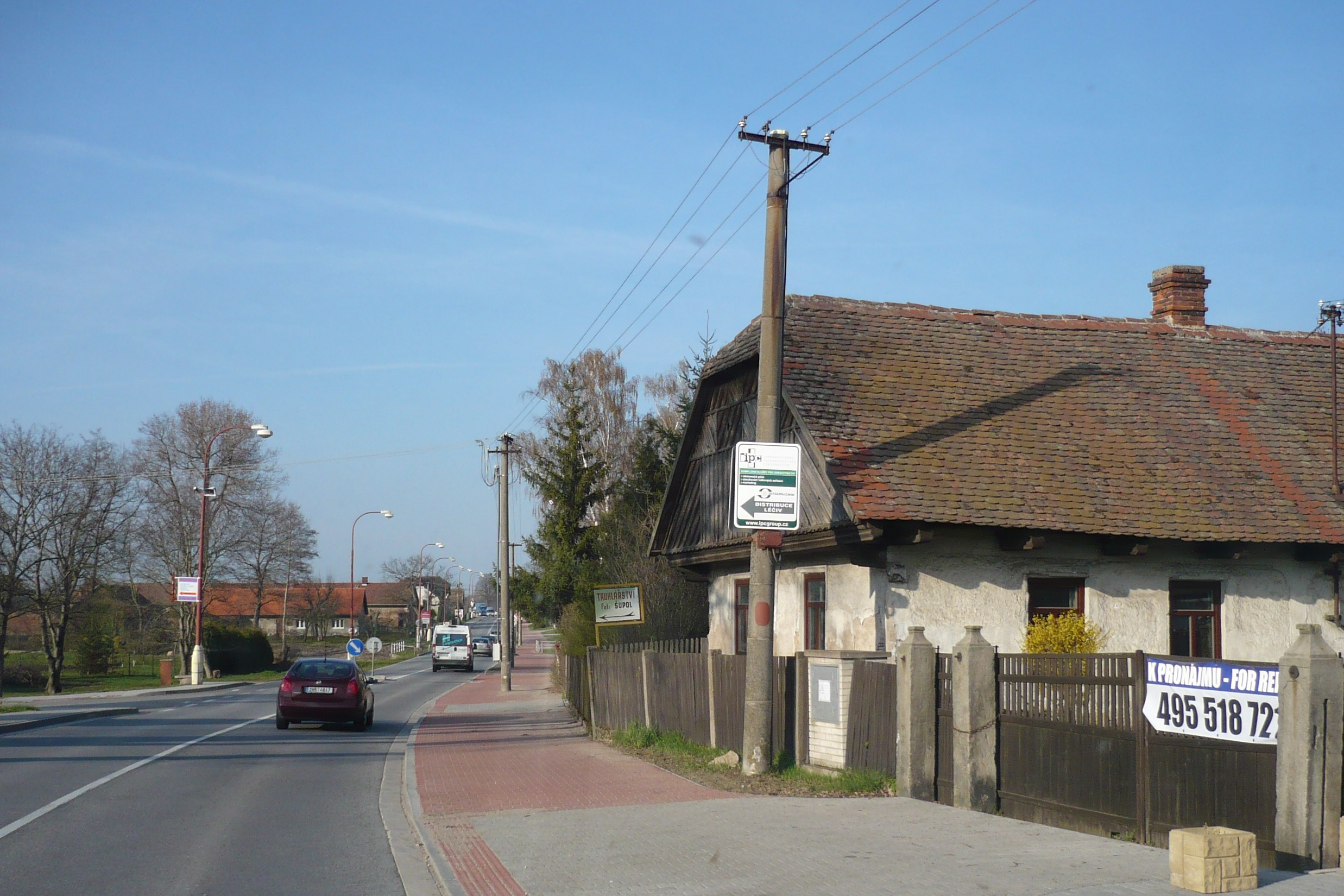
- Main road

- Flag Coat of arms

- Location in the Czech Republic
- Coordinates: 50°9′12″N 15°45′24″E
- Country: Czech Republic
- Region: Pardubice
- District: Pardubice
- First mentioned: 1436

Area
  - Total: 5.72 km^{2} (2.21 sq mi)
- Elevation: 230 m (750 ft)

Population (2026-01-01)
  - Total: 714
  - Density: 125/km^{2} (323/sq mi)
- Time zone: UTC+1 (CET)
  - Summer (DST): UTC+2 (CEST)
- Postal code: 533 45
- Website: www.libisany.cz

Libišany is a municipality and village in Pardubice District in the Pardubice Region of the Czech Republic. It has about 700 inhabitants.

== Demographics ==
Historical population
Year	Pop.	±%
1869	526	—
1880	569	+8.2%
1890	588	+3.3%
1900	562	−4.4%
1910	571	+1.6%
1921	561	−1.8%
1930	521	−7.1%
1950	462	−11.3%
1961	459	−0.6%
1970	432	−5.9%
1980	423	−2.1%
1991	385	−9.0%
2001	409	+6.2%
2011	480	+17.4%
2021	647	+34.8%
Source: Censuses
