= Poběžovice u Přelouče =

- Municipality
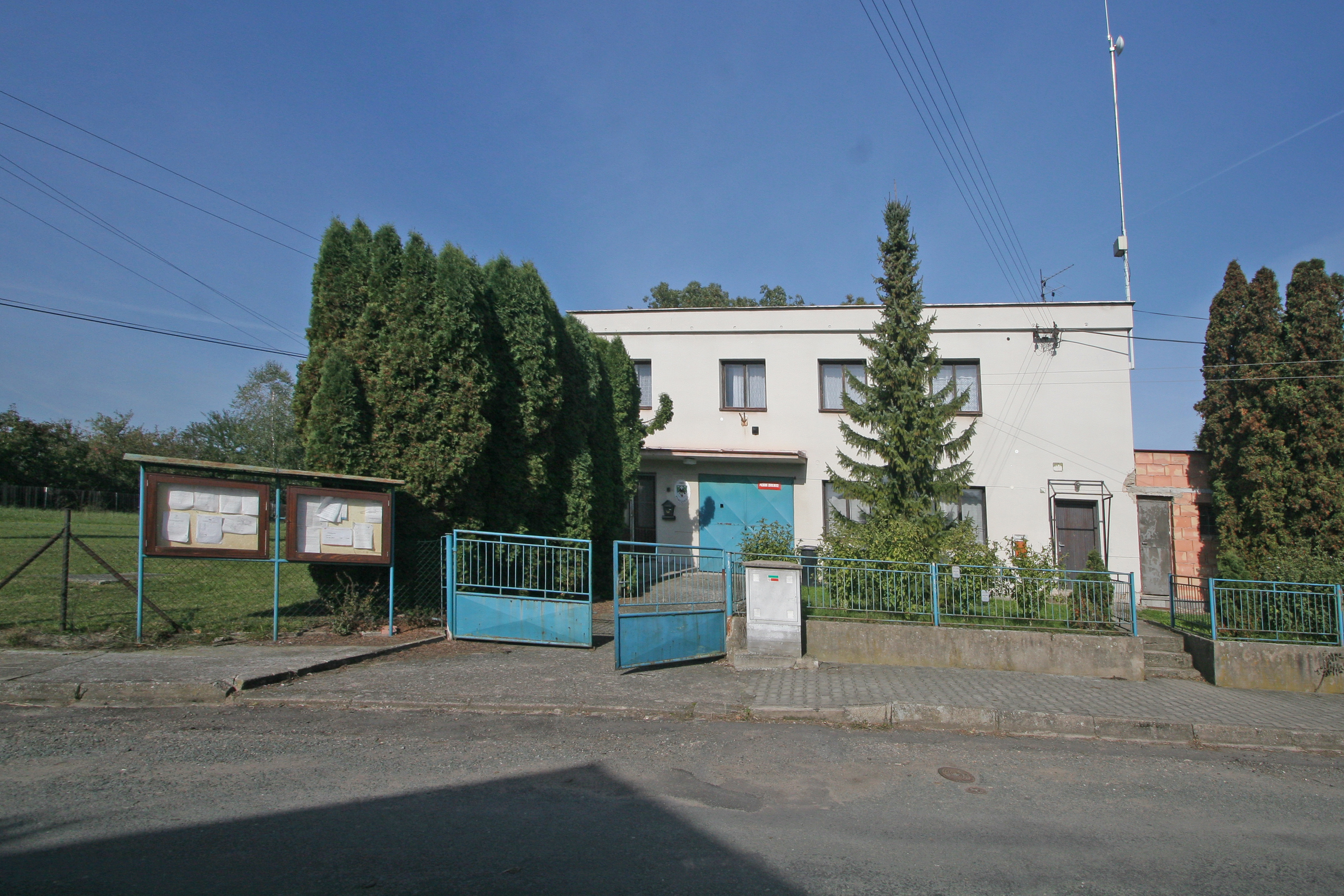
- Municipal office

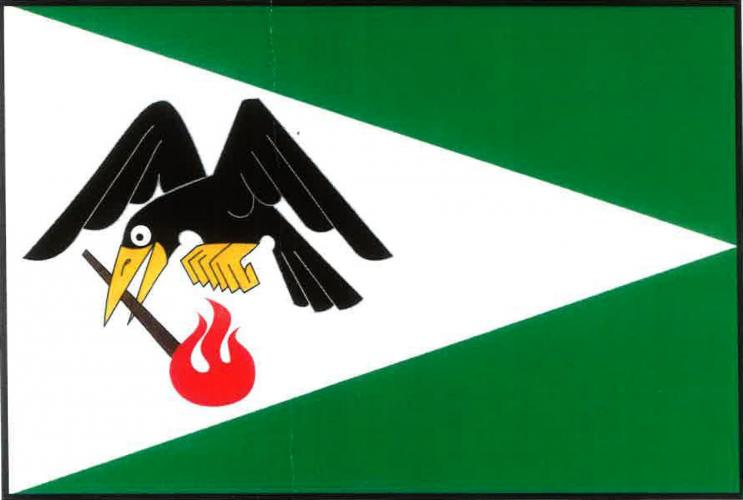
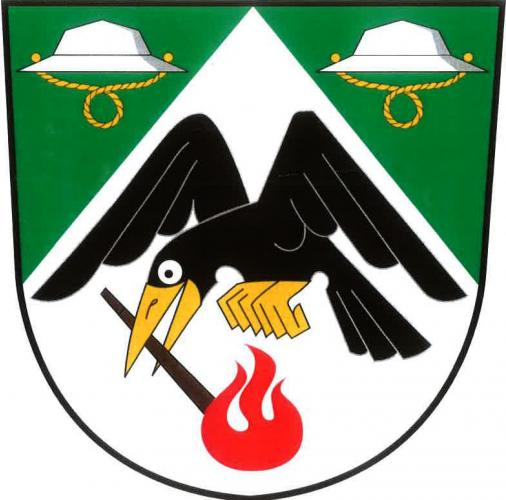
- Flag Coat of arms

- Location in the Czech Republic
- Coordinates: 49°59′28″N 15°34′55″E
- Country: Czech Republic
- Region: Pardubice
- District: Pardubice
- First mentioned: 1399

Area
  - Total: 1.71 km^{2} (0.66 sq mi)
- Elevation: 248 m (814 ft)

Population (2026-01-01)
  - Total: 129
  - Density: 75.4/km^{2} (195/sq mi)
- Time zone: UTC+1 (CET)
  - Summer (DST): UTC+2 (CEST)
- Postal code: 535 01
- Website: www.pobezoviceuprelouce.cz

Poběžovice u Přelouče is a municipality and village in Pardubice District in the Pardubice Region of the Czech Republic. It has about 100 inhabitants.

== Demographics ==
Historical population
Year	Pop.	±%
1869	185	—
1880	167	−9.7%
1890	153	−8.4%
1900	156	+2.0%
1910	163	+4.5%
1921	181	+11.0%
1930	175	−3.3%
1950	124	−29.1%
1961	130	+4.8%
1970	117	−10.0%
1980	104	−11.1%
1991	81	−22.1%
2001	79	−2.5%
2011	85	+7.6%
2021	120	+41.2%
Source: Censuses
