= Kostěnice =

- Municipality
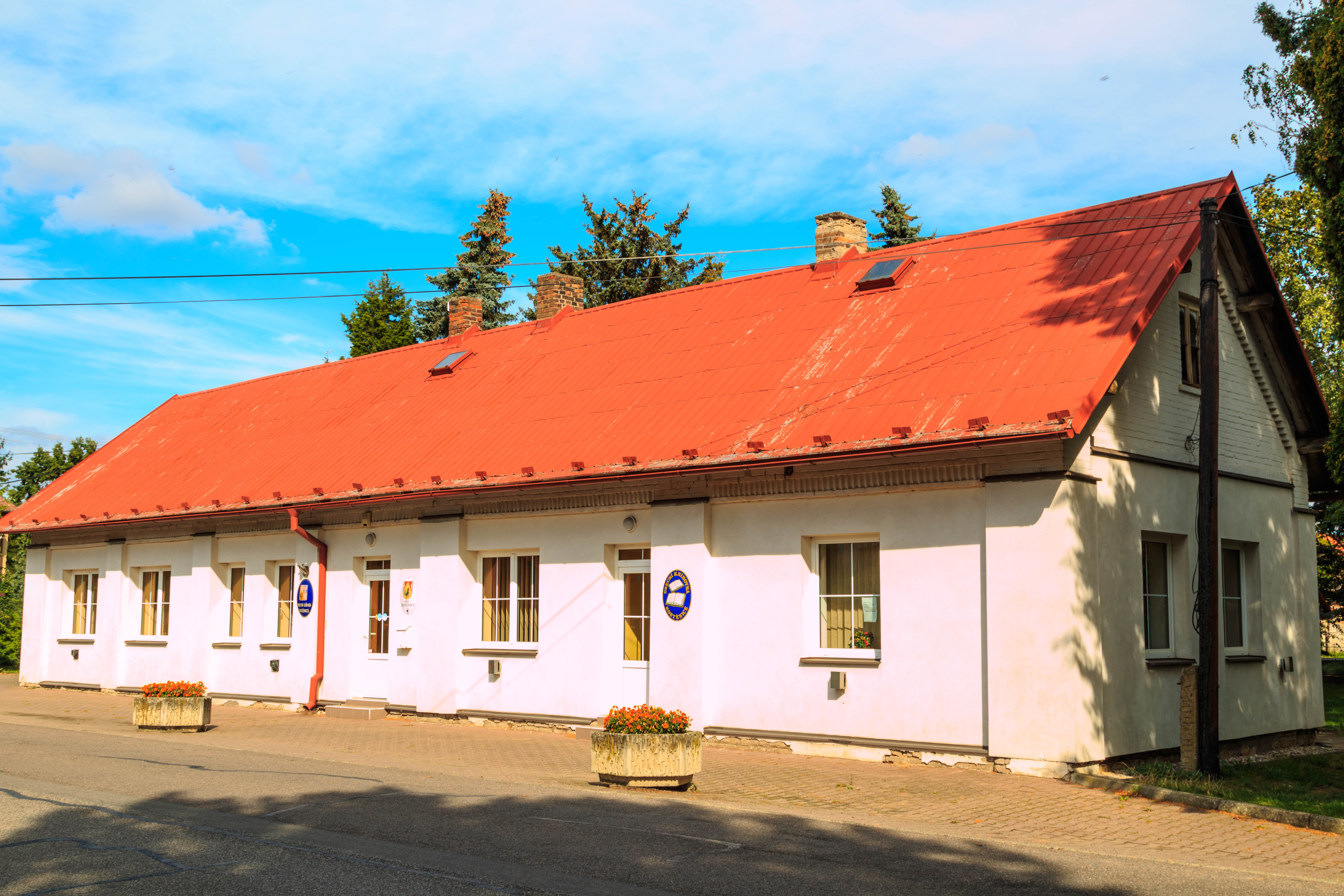
- Municipal office

- Flag Coat of arms

- Location in the Czech Republic
- Coordinates: 50°0′35″N 15°54′13″E
- Country: Czech Republic
- Region: Pardubice
- District: Pardubice
- First mentioned: 1398

Area
  - Total: 5.76 km^{2} (2.22 sq mi)
- Elevation: 235 m (771 ft)

Population (2026-01-01)
  - Total: 583
  - Density: 101/km^{2} (262/sq mi)
- Time zone: UTC+1 (CET)
  - Summer (DST): UTC+2 (CEST)
- Postal code: 530 02
- Website: www.kostenice.cz

Kostěnice is a municipality and village in Pardubice District in the Pardubice Region of the Czech Republic. It has about 600 inhabitants.

== Demographics ==
Historical population
Year	Pop.	±%
1869	464	—
1880	559	+20.5%
1890	508	−9.1%
1900	501	−1.4%
1910	503	+0.4%
1921	551	+9.5%
1930	559	+1.5%
1950	495	−11.4%
1961	498	+0.6%
1970	495	−0.6%
1980	512	+3.4%
1991	504	−1.6%
2001	518	+2.8%
2011	502	−3.1%
2021	547	+9.0%
Source: Censuses
