= Dolní Ředice =

- Municipality
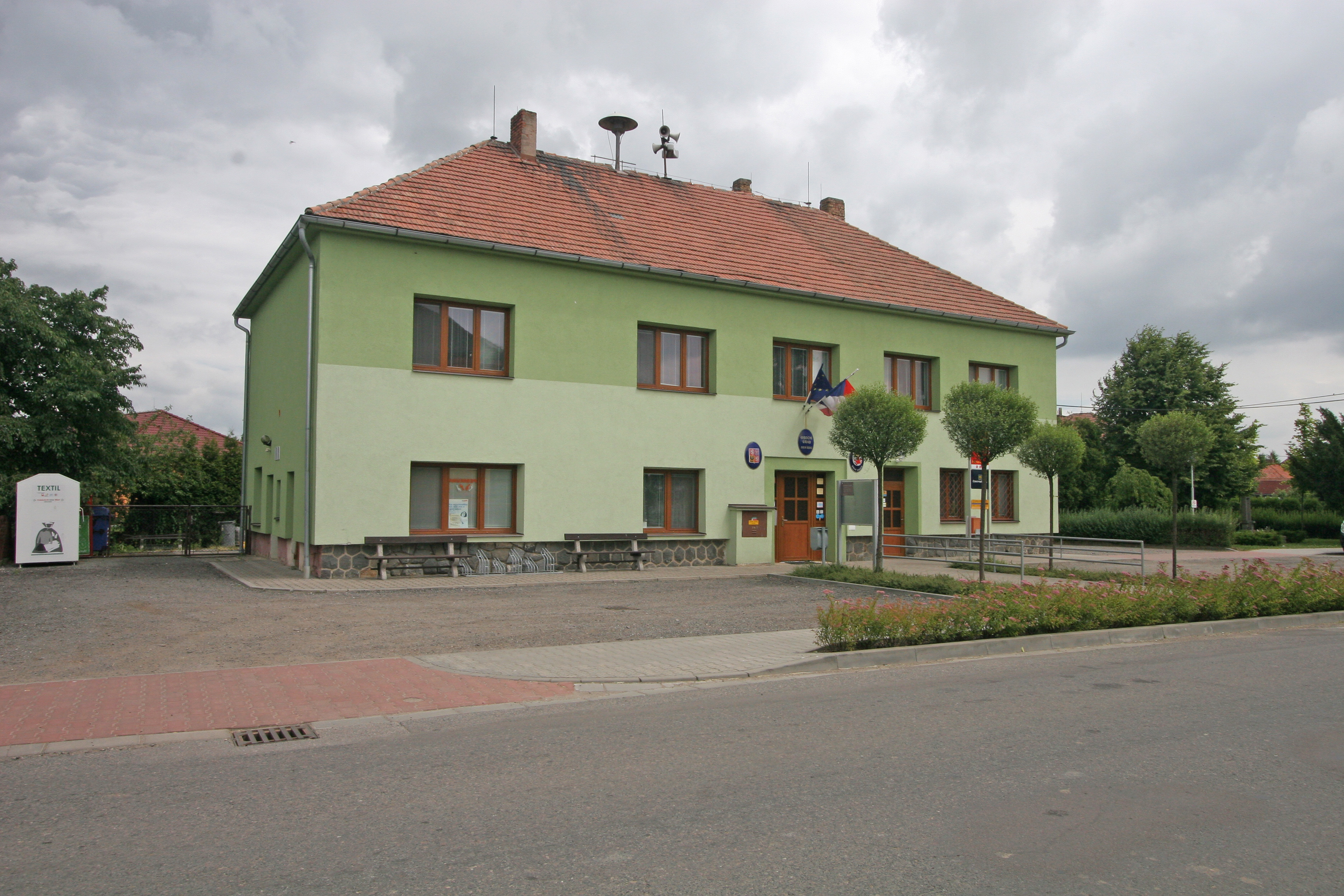
- Municipal office

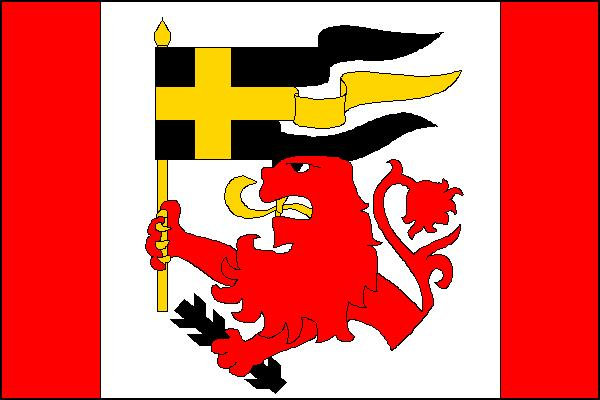
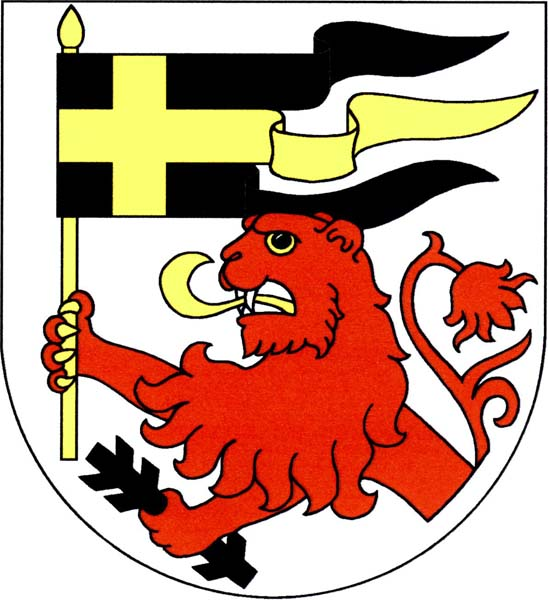
- Flag Coat of arms

- Location in the Czech Republic
- Coordinates: 50°4′40″N 15°55′26″E
- Country: Czech Republic
- Region: Pardubice
- District: Pardubice
- First mentioned: 1336

Area
  - Total: 10.64 km^{2} (4.11 sq mi)
- Elevation: 233 m (764 ft)

Population (2026-01-01)
  - Total: 1,116
  - Density: 104.9/km^{2} (271.7/sq mi)
- Time zone: UTC+1 (CET)
  - Summer (DST): UTC+2 (CEST)
- Postal code: 533 75
- Website: www.dolniredice.cz

Dolní Ředice (German: Nieder Reditz) is a municipality and village in Pardubice District in the Pardubice Region of the Czech Republic. It has about 1,100 inhabitants.

== Demographics ==
Historical population
Year	Pop.	±%
1869	805	—
1880	844	+4.8%
1890	857	+1.5%
1900	892	+4.1%
1910	952	+6.7%
1921	972	+2.1%
1930	969	−0.3%
1950	819	−15.5%
1961	828	+1.1%
1970	772	−6.8%
1980	761	−1.4%
1991	779	+2.4%
2001	770	−1.2%
2011	818	+6.2%
2021	982	+20.0%
Source: Censuses
