= Lejšovka =

- Municipality
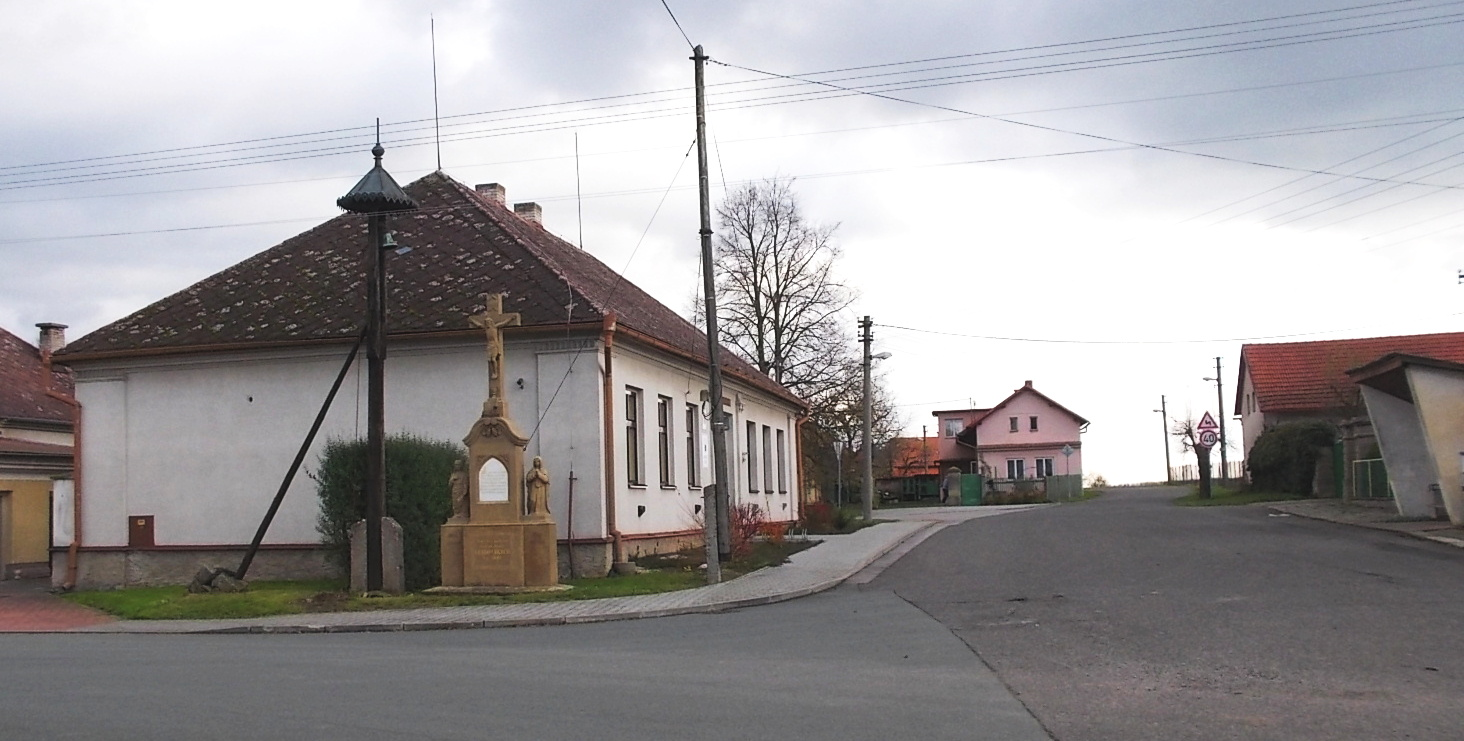
- Centre of Lejšovka

- Location in the Czech Republic
- Coordinates: 50°17′52″N 15°56′33″E
- Country: Czech Republic
- Region: Hradec Králové
- District: Hradec Králové
- First mentioned: 1406

Area
  - Total: 3.11 km^{2} (1.20 sq mi)
- Elevation: 254 m (833 ft)

Population (2026-01-01)
  - Total: 212
  - Density: 68.2/km^{2} (177/sq mi)
- Time zone: UTC+1 (CET)
  - Summer (DST): UTC+2 (CEST)
- Postal code: 503 03
- Website: www.lejsovka.cz

Lejšovka is a municipality and village in Hradec Králové District in the Hradec Králové Region of the Czech Republic. It has about 200 inhabitants.

== Demographics ==
Historical population
Year	Pop.	±%
1869	308	—
1880	327	+6.2%
1890	298	−8.9%
1900	301	+1.0%
1910	325	+8.0%
1921	352	+8.3%
1930	333	−5.4%
1950	238	−28.5%
1961	238	+0.0%
1970	208	−12.6%
1980	178	−14.4%
1991	157	−11.8%
2001	171	+8.9%
2011	197	+15.2%
2021	212	+7.6%
Source: Censuses
