= Spojil =

- Municipality
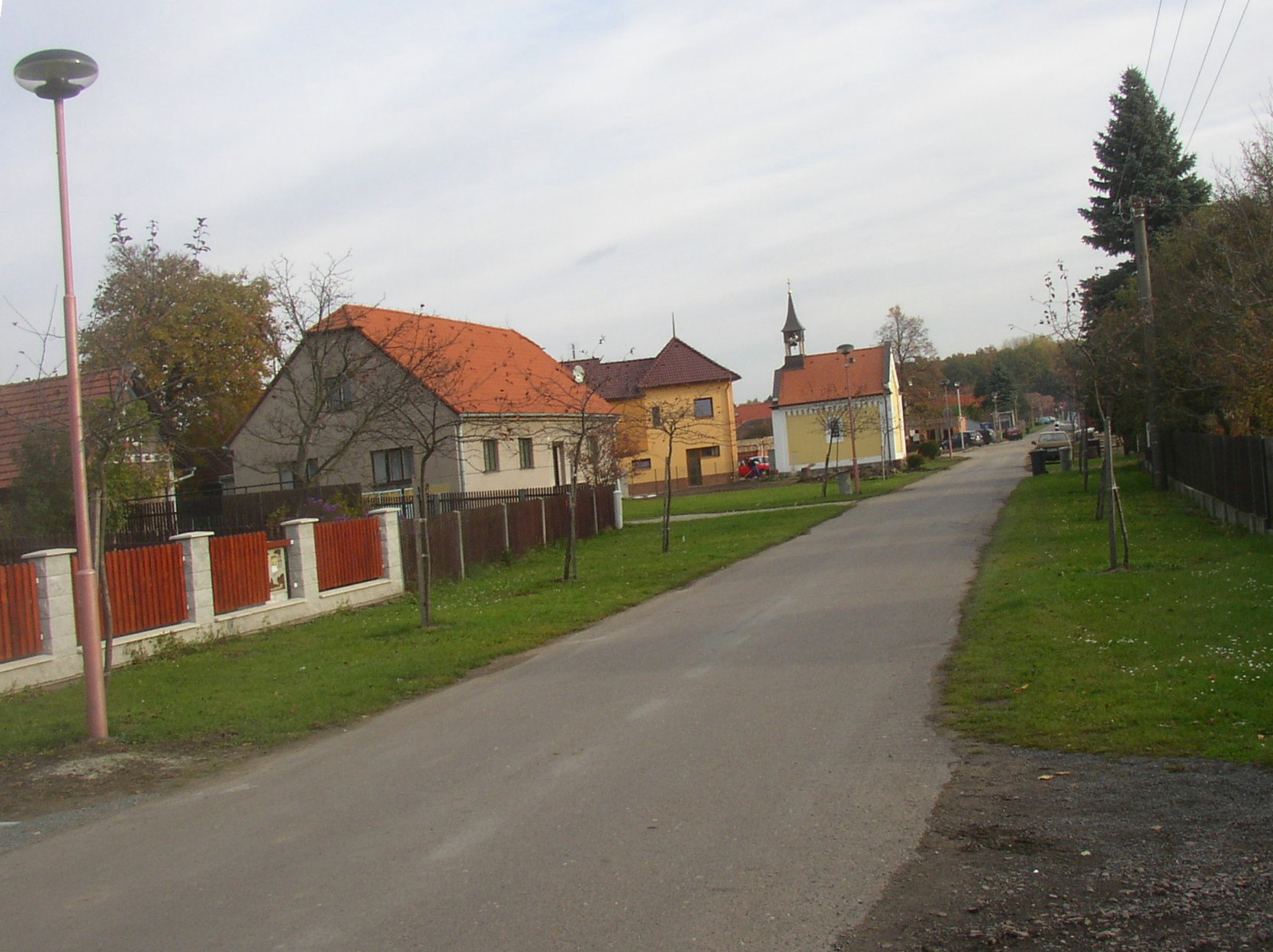
- Main street towards northeast

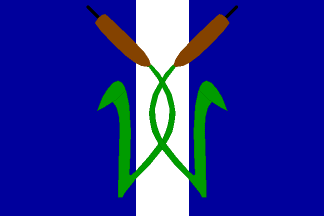
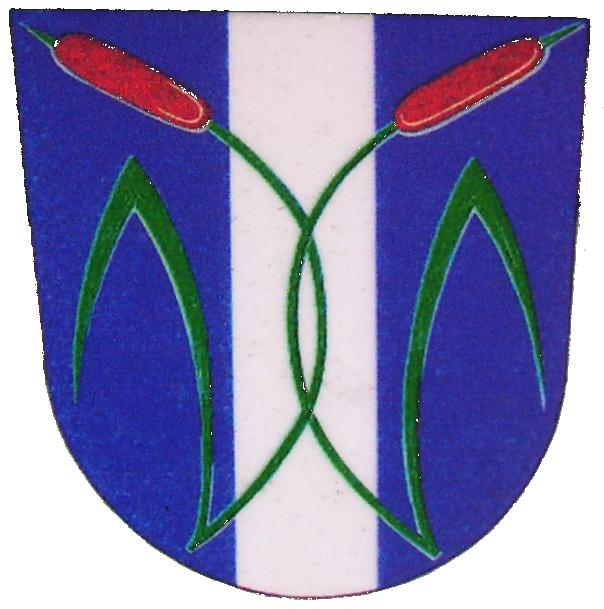
- Flag Coat of arms

- Location in the Czech Republic
- Coordinates: 50°2′32″N 15°49′19″E
- Country: Czech Republic
- Region: Pardubice
- District: Pardubice
- Founded: 1785

Area
  - Total: 1.75 km^{2} (0.68 sq mi)
- Elevation: 221 m (725 ft)

Population (2026-01-01)
  - Total: 531
  - Density: 303/km^{2} (786/sq mi)
- Time zone: UTC+1 (CET)
  - Summer (DST): UTC+2 (CEST)
- Postal code: 530 02
- Website: www.spojil.cz

Spojil is a municipality and village in Pardubice District in the Pardubice Region of the Czech Republic. It has about 500 inhabitants.

== Etymology ==
The village was named after a former fishpond in the area. The name translates as 'connected'.

== Geography ==
Spojil forms an enclave in the territory of the city of Pardubice. It lies in a flat landscape in the East Elbe Table.

== History ==
Spojil is among the youngest villages in the region. It was founded in 1785 at the site of two former fishponds named Spojil and Strejček.

The village was a municipal part of Pardubice from 1961 until 1991.

== Demographics ==
Historical population

Year	Pop.	±%
1869	193	—
1880	212	+9.8%
1890	216	+1.9%
1900	197	−8.8%
1910	202	+2.5%

Year	Pop.	±%
1921	190	−5.9%
1930	164	−13.7%
1950	169	+3.0%
1961	189	+11.8%
1970	207	+9.5%

Year	Pop.	±%
1980	224	+8.2%
1991	235	+4.9%
2001	258	+9.8%
2011	482	+86.8%
2021	587	+21.8%

Source: Censuses

== Transport ==
There are no railways or major roads passing through the municipality.

== Sights ==
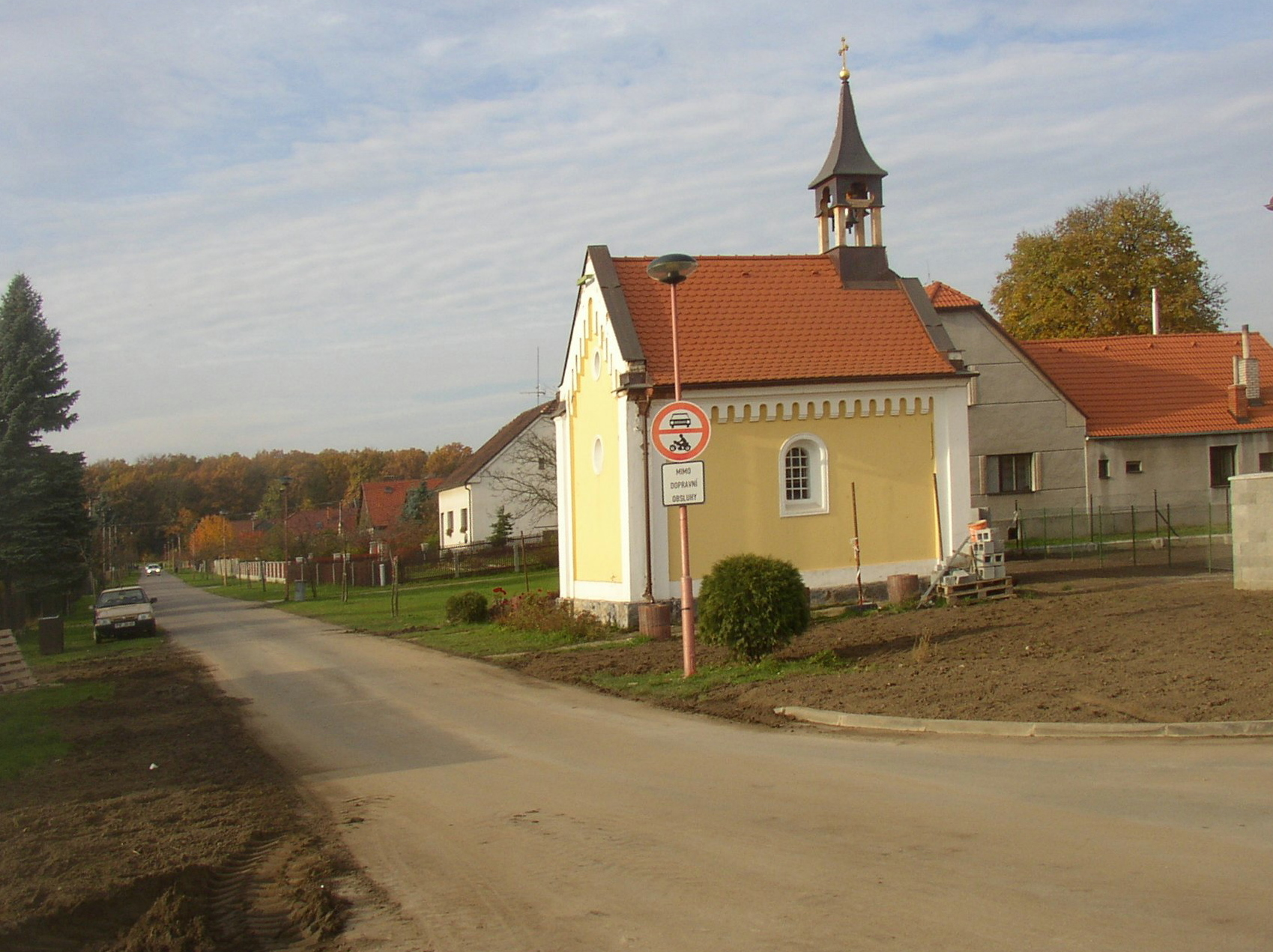
Main street towards southwest

There are no protected cultural monuments in the municipality. The main landmark of Spojil is the Chapel of the Assumption of the Virgin Mary, built in 1868.
