= Jeníkovice (Hradec Králové District) =

- Municipality
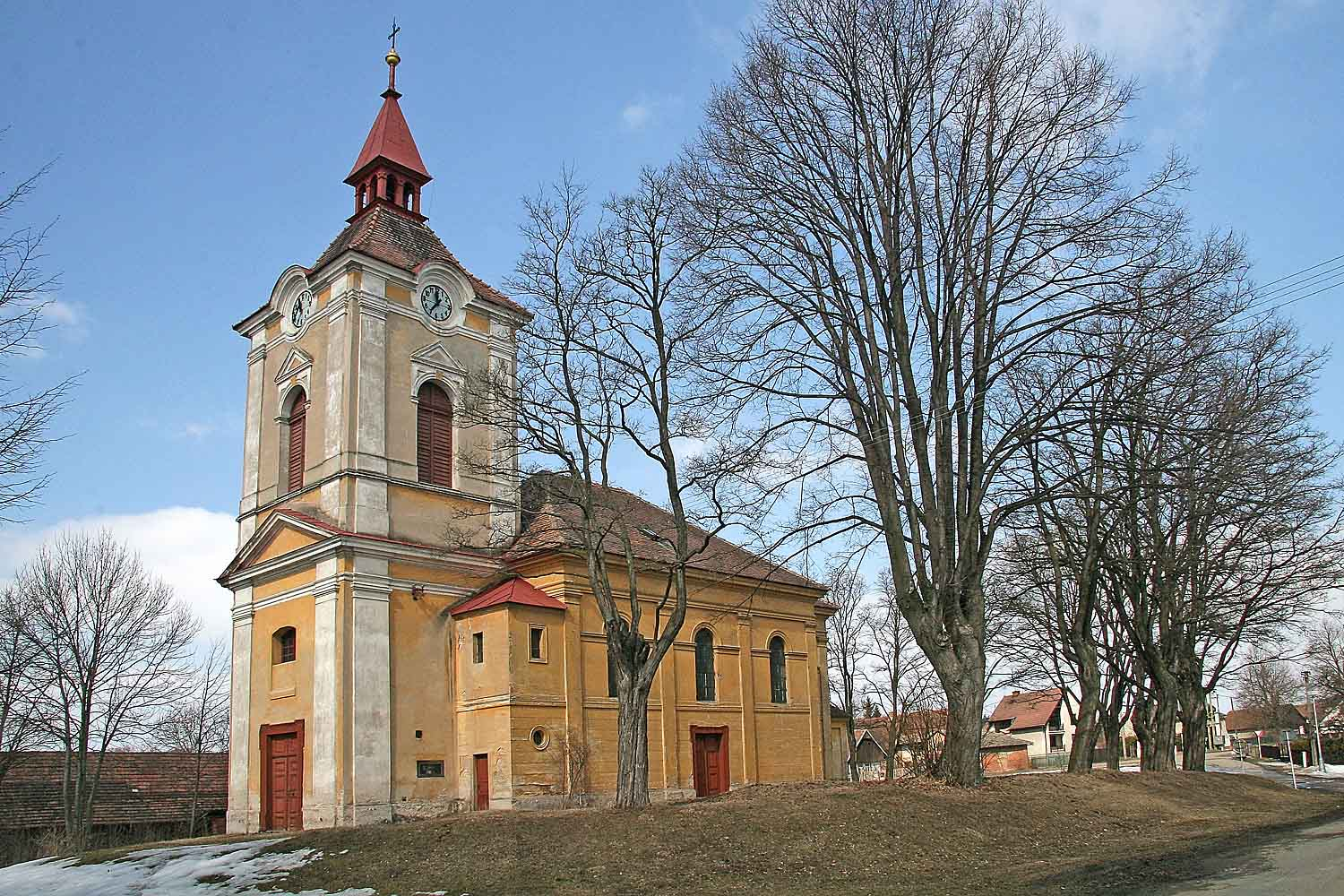
- Church of Saints Peter and Paul

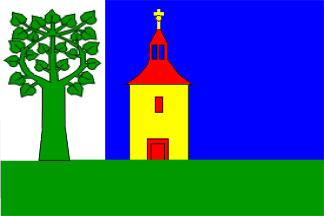
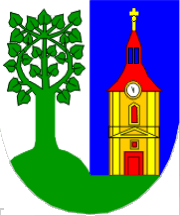
- Flag Coat of arms

- Location in the Czech Republic
- Coordinates: 50°13′42″N 16°0′10″E
- Country: Czech Republic
- Region: Hradec Králové
- District: Hradec Králové
- First mentioned: 1385

Area
  - Total: 7.40 km^{2} (2.86 sq mi)
- Elevation: 272 m (892 ft)

Population (2026-01-01)
  - Total: 528
  - Density: 71.4/km^{2} (185/sq mi)
- Time zone: UTC+1 (CET)
  - Summer (DST): UTC+2 (CEST)
- Postal code: 503 46
- Website: jenikovice.trebechovicko.cz

Jeníkovice is a municipality and village in Hradec Králové District in the Hradec Králové Region of the Czech Republic. It has about 500 inhabitants.

== Demographics ==
Historical population
Year	Pop.	±%
1869	754	—
1880	839	+11.3%
1890	918	+9.4%
1900	957	+4.2%
1910	1,005	+5.0%
1921	882	−12.2%
1930	828	−6.1%
1950	672	−18.8%
1961	590	−12.2%
1970	547	−7.3%
1980	474	−13.3%
1991	386	−18.6%
2001	399	+3.4%
2011	433	+8.5%
2021	492	+13.6%
Source: Censuses
