= Křičeň =

- Municipality
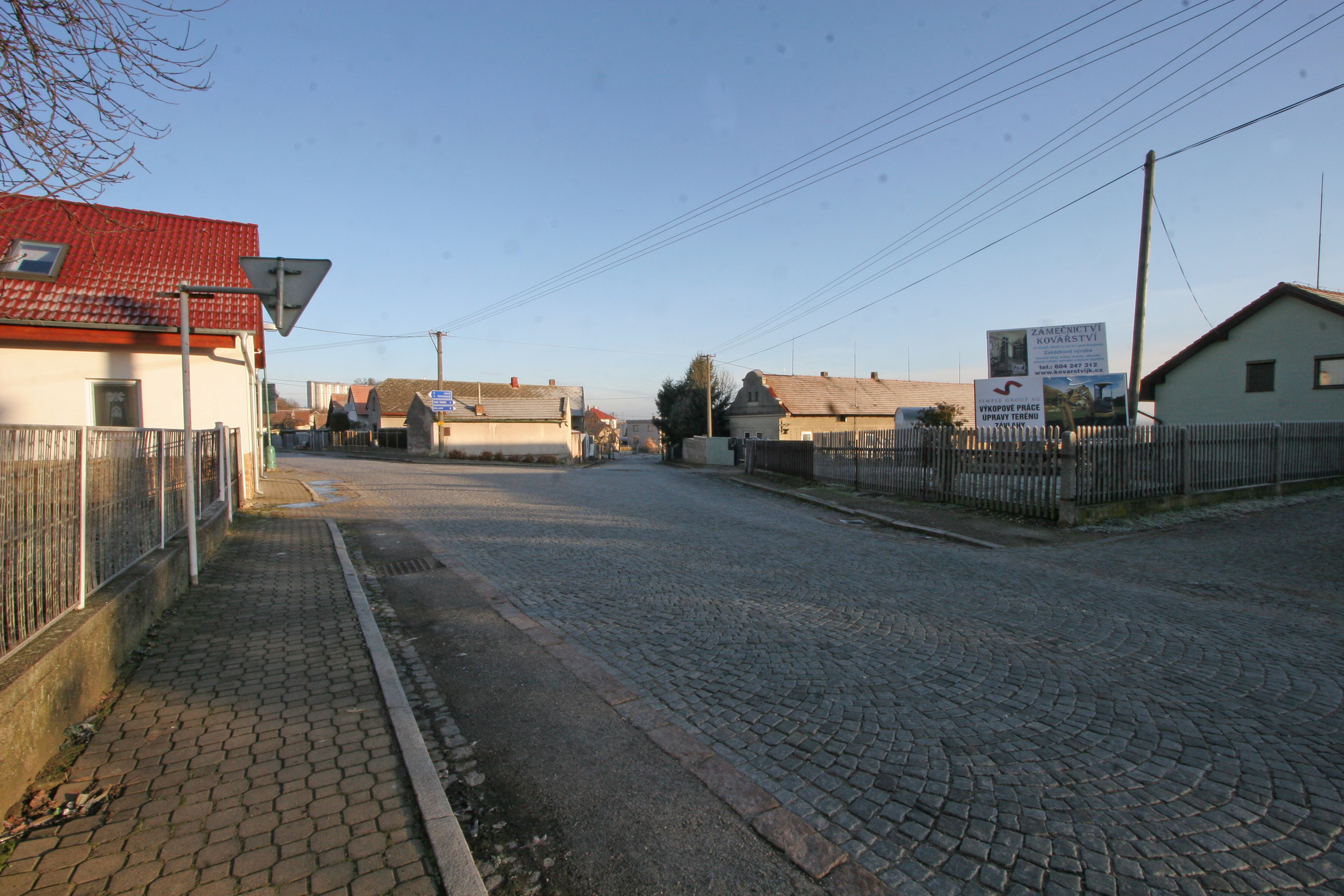
- Crossroads in the centre of Křičeň

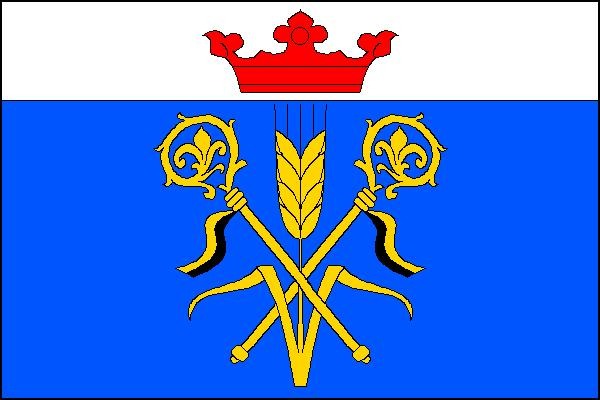
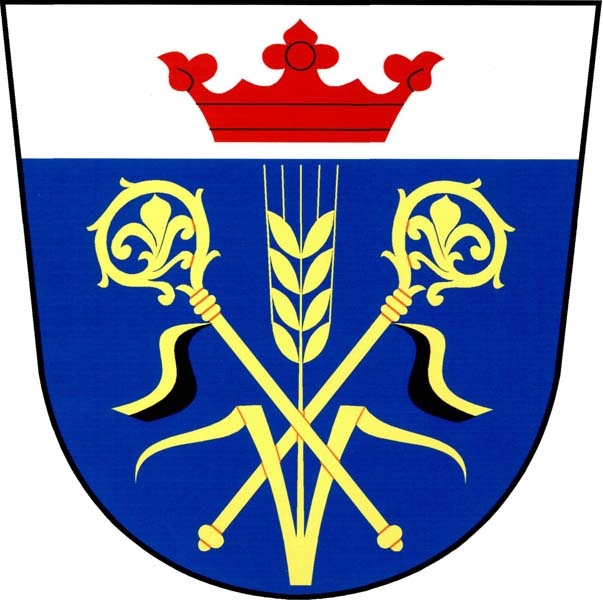
- Flag Coat of arms

- Location in the Czech Republic
- Coordinates: 50°6′34″N 15°39′6″E
- Country: Czech Republic
- Region: Pardubice
- District: Pardubice
- First mentioned: 1436

Area
  - Total: 4.34 km^{2} (1.68 sq mi)
- Elevation: 237 m (778 ft)

Population (2026-01-01)
  - Total: 302
  - Density: 69.6/km^{2} (180/sq mi)
- Time zone: UTC+1 (CET)
  - Summer (DST): UTC+2 (CEST)
- Postal code: 533 41
- Website: www.kricen.cz

Křičeň is a municipality and village in Pardubice District in the Pardubice Region of the Czech Republic. It has about 300 inhabitants.

== Demographics ==
Historical population
Year	Pop.	±%
1869	422	—
1880	476	+12.8%
1890	527	+10.7%
1900	461	−12.5%
1910	466	+1.1%
1921	446	−4.3%
1930	417	−6.5%
1950	320	−23.3%
1961	311	−2.8%
1970	283	−9.0%
1980	294	+3.9%
1991	259	−11.9%
2001	251	−3.1%
2011	249	−0.8%
2021	226	−9.2%
Source: Censuses
