= Lochenice =

- Municipality
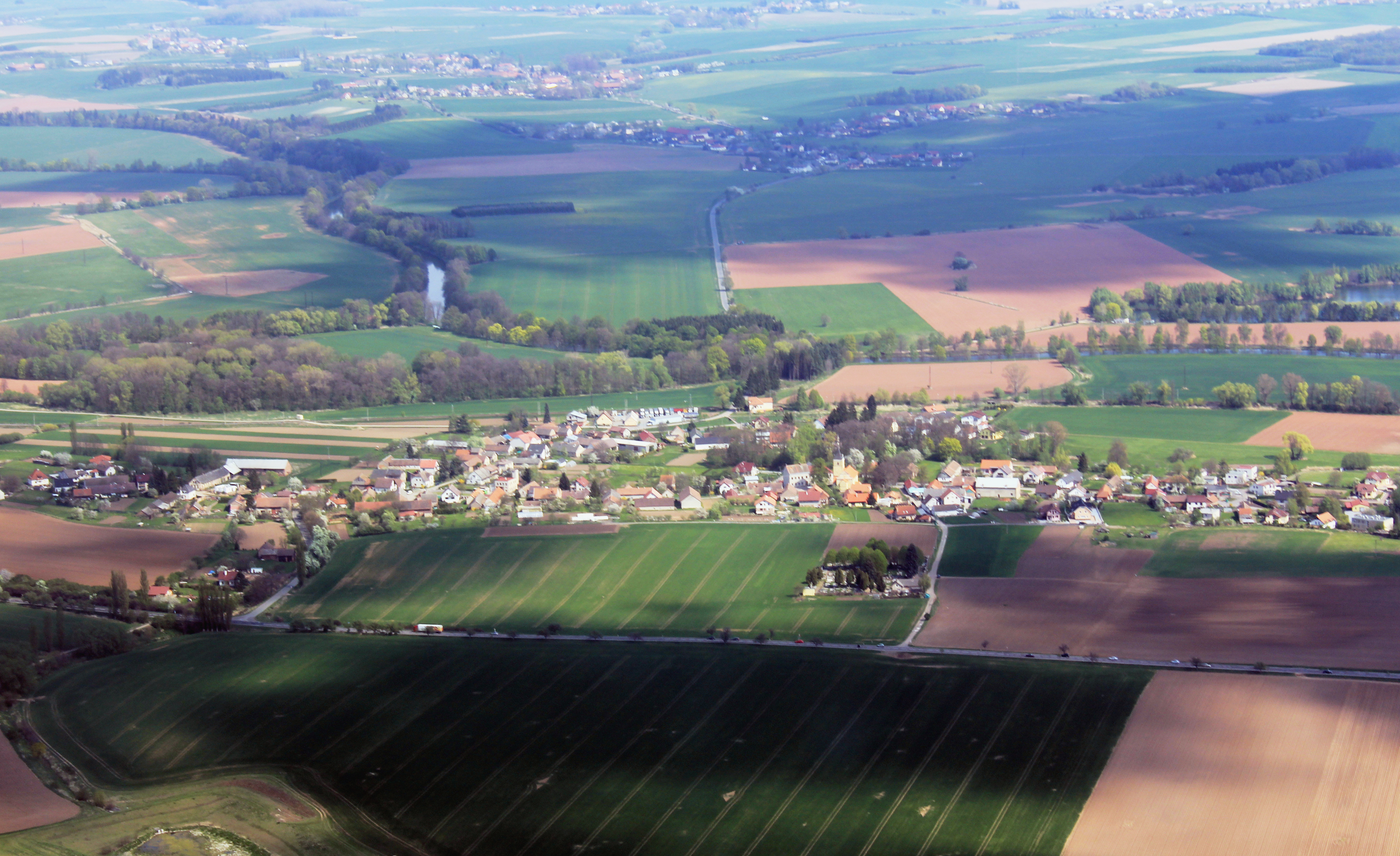
- Aerial view

- Flag Coat of arms

- Location in the Czech Republic
- Coordinates: 50°16′20″N 15°49′8″E
- Country: Czech Republic
- Region: Hradec Králové
- District: Hradec Králové
- First mentioned: 1143

Area
  - Total: 6.17 km^{2} (2.38 sq mi)
- Elevation: 244 m (801 ft)

Population (2026-01-01)
  - Total: 611
  - Density: 99.0/km^{2} (256/sq mi)
- Time zone: UTC+1 (CET)
  - Summer (DST): UTC+2 (CEST)
- Postal code: 503 02
- Website: www.obec-lochenice.cz

Lochenice is a municipality and village in Hradec Králové District in the Hradec Králové Region of the Czech Republic. It has about 600 inhabitants.

== Demographics ==
Historical population
Year	Pop.	±%
1869	822	—
1880	839	+2.1%
1890	866	+3.2%
1900	766	−11.5%
1910	746	−2.6%
1921	722	−3.2%
1930	833	+15.4%
1950	614	−26.3%
1961	572	−6.8%
1970	491	−14.2%
1980	456	−7.1%
1991	436	−4.4%
2001	504	+15.6%
2011	573	+13.7%
2021	622	+8.6%
Source: Censuses
