= Rozhovice =

- Municipality
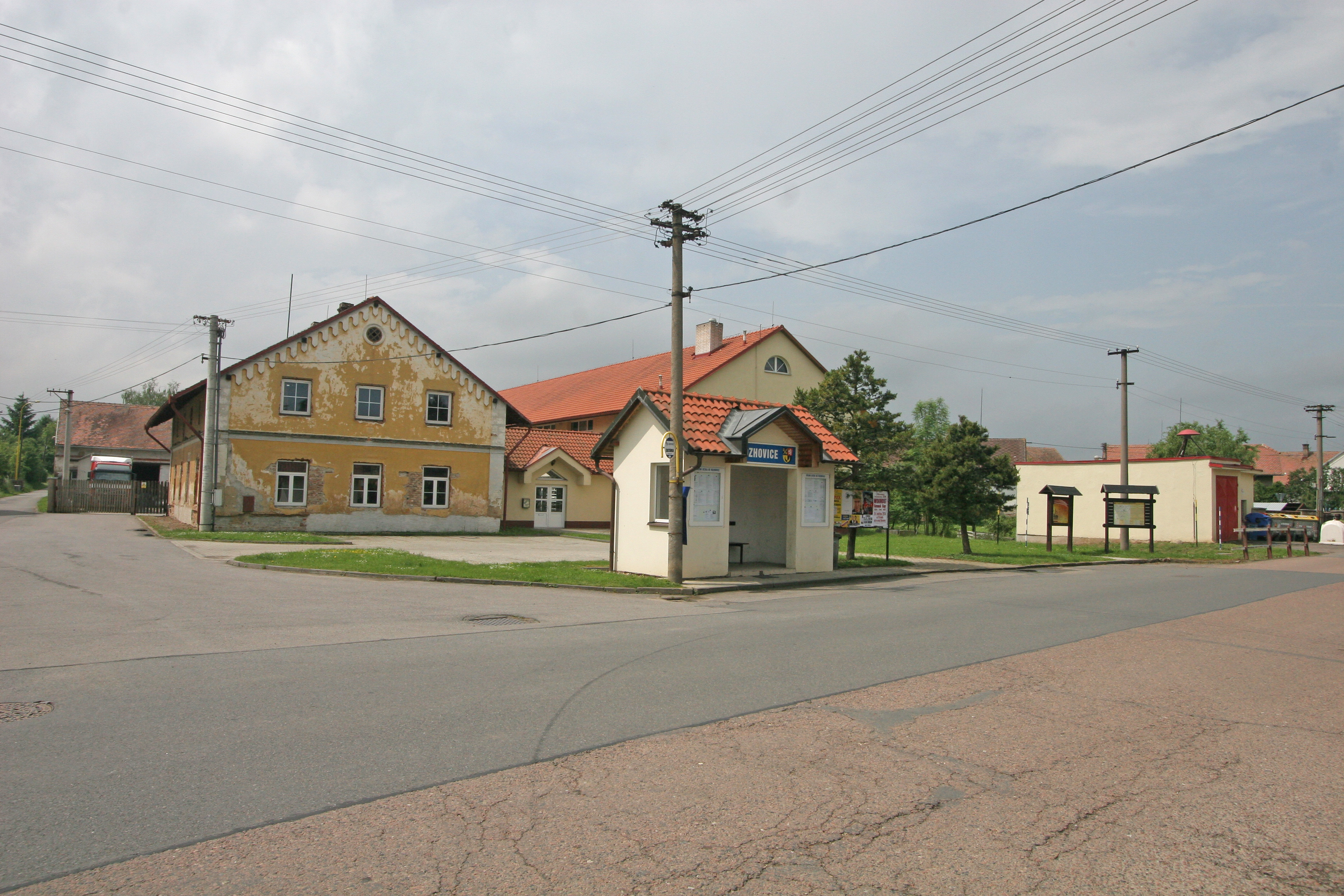
- Centre of Rozhovice

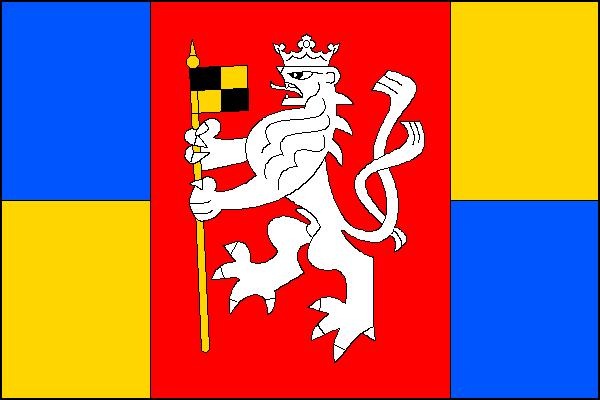
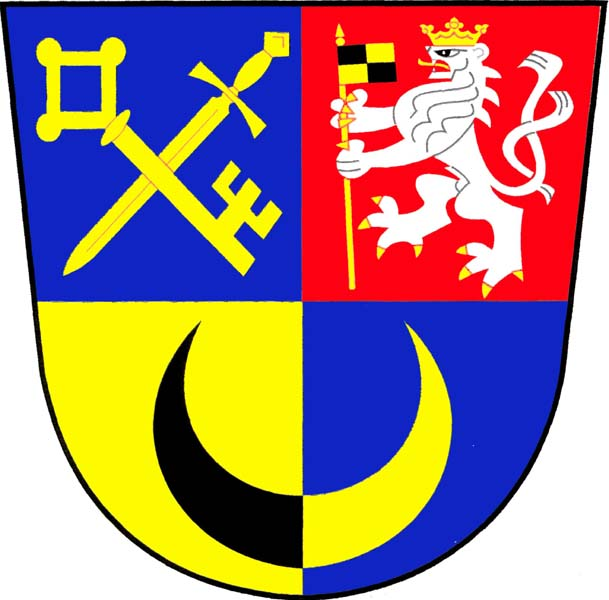
- Flag Coat of arms

- Location in the Czech Republic
- Coordinates: 49°58′2″N 15°42′49″E
- Country: Czech Republic
- Region: Pardubice
- District: Chrudim
- First mentioned: 1131

Area
  - Total: 4.71 km^{2} (1.82 sq mi)
- Elevation: 259 m (850 ft)

Population (2026-01-01)
  - Total: 323
  - Density: 68.6/km^{2} (178/sq mi)
- Time zone: UTC+1 (CET)
  - Summer (DST): UTC+2 (CEST)
- Postal code: 538 03
- Website: www.rozhovice.cz

Rozhovice is a municipality and village in Chrudim District in the Pardubice Region of the Czech Republic. It has about 300 inhabitants.

== Demographics ==
Historical population
Year	Pop.	±%
1869	372	—
1880	387	+4.0%
1890	433	+11.9%
1900	427	−1.4%
1910	431	+0.9%
1921	432	+0.2%
1930	400	−7.4%
1950	267	−33.2%
1961	291	+9.0%
1970	285	−2.1%
1980	274	−3.9%
1991	253	−7.7%
2001	248	−2.0%
2011	264	+6.5%
2021	287	+8.7%
Source: Censuses
