= Vysoká nad Labem =

- Municipality
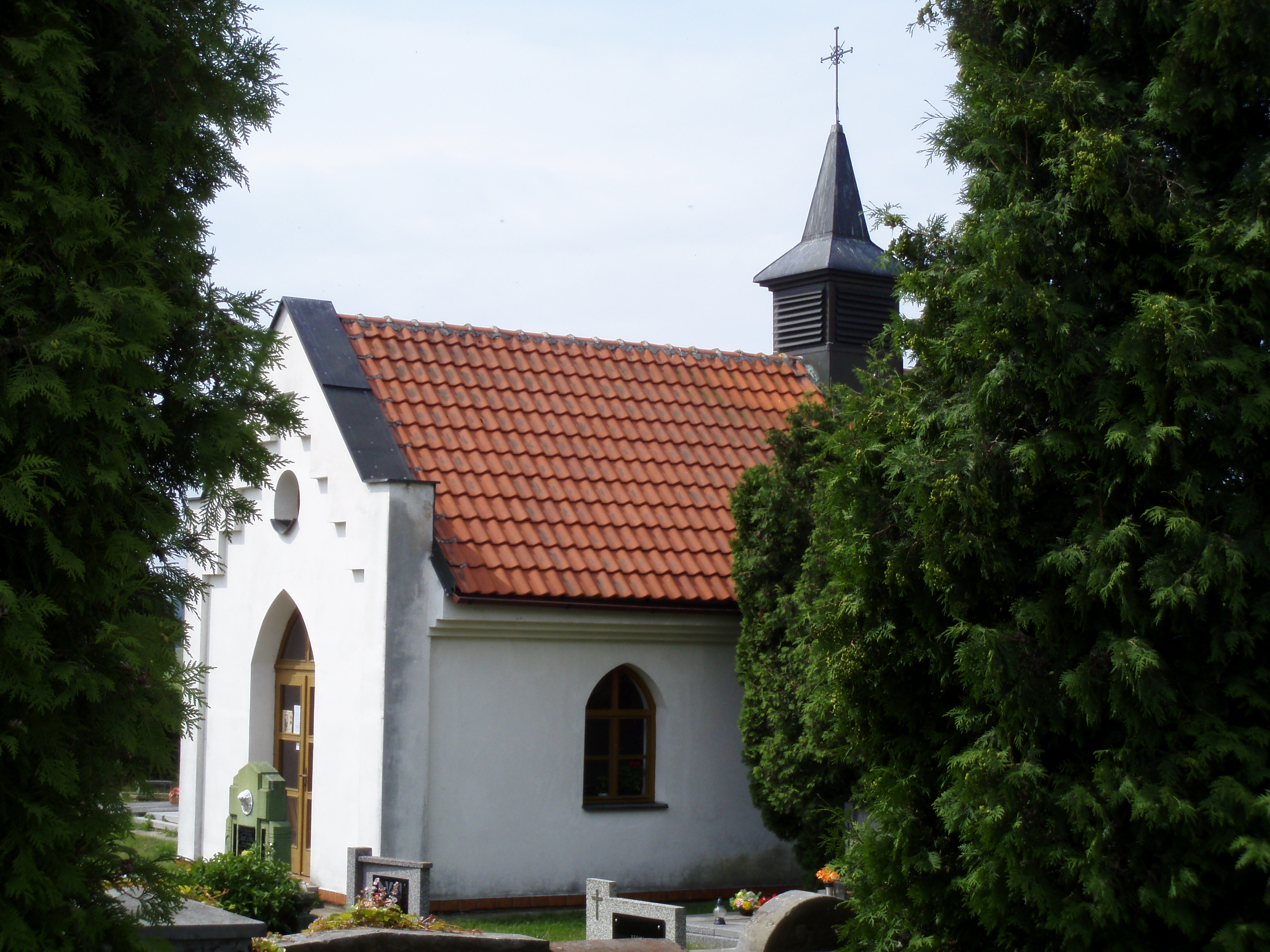
- Chapel in Vysoká nad Labem

- Flag Coat of arms

- Location in the Czech Republic
- Coordinates: 50°9′12″N 15°49′29″E
- Country: Czech Republic
- Region: Hradec Králové
- District: Hradec Králové
- First mentioned: 1073

Area
  - Total: 15.32 km^{2} (5.92 sq mi)
- Elevation: 240 m (790 ft)

Population (2026-01-01)
  - Total: 1,804
  - Density: 117.8/km^{2} (305.0/sq mi)
- Time zone: UTC+1 (CET)
  - Summer (DST): UTC+2 (CEST)
- Postal code: 503 31
- Website: www.vysoka-nad-labem.cz

Vysoká nad Labem is a municipality and village in Hradec Králové District in the Hradec Králové Region of the Czech Republic. It has about 1,800 inhabitants.

== Demographics ==
Historical population
Year	Pop.	±%
1869	785	—
1880	907	+15.5%
1890	919	+1.3%
1900	860	−6.4%
1910	795	−7.6%
1921	758	−4.7%
1930	737	−2.8%
1950	619	−16.0%
1961	619	+0.0%
1970	636	+2.7%
1980	645	+1.4%
1991	617	−4.3%
2001	645	+4.5%
2011	1,293	+100.5%
2021	1,794	+38.7%
Source: Censuses
