= Nabočany =

- Municipality
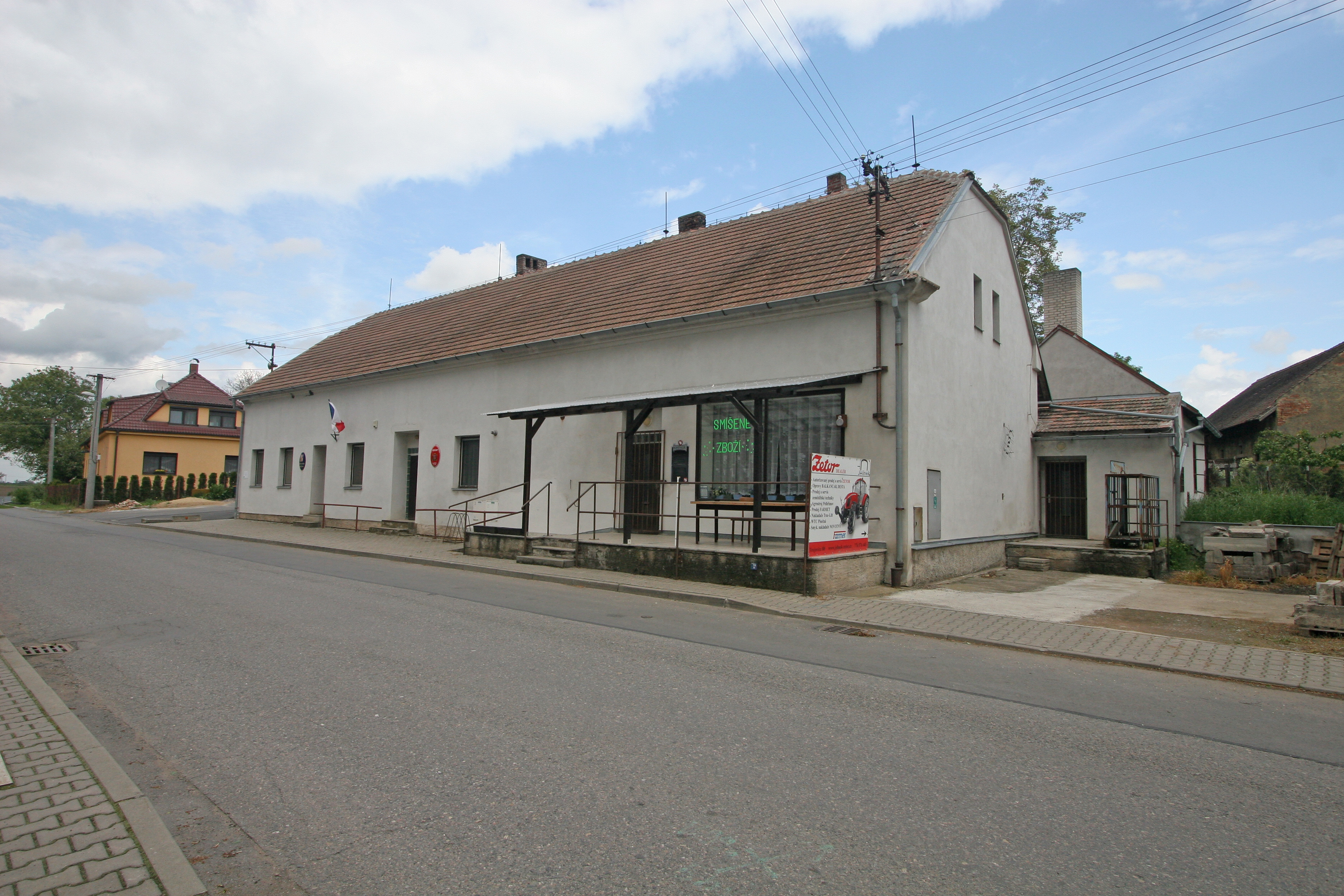
- Municipal office

- Location in the Czech Republic
- Coordinates: 49°56′38″N 15°53′13″E
- Country: Czech Republic
- Region: Pardubice
- District: Chrudim
- First mentioned: 1275

Area
  - Total: 3.17 km^{2} (1.22 sq mi)
- Elevation: 255 m (837 ft)

Population (2026-01-01)
  - Total: 126
  - Density: 39.7/km^{2} (103/sq mi)
- Time zone: UTC+1 (CET)
  - Summer (DST): UTC+2 (CEST)
- Postal code: 538 62
- Website: www.nabocany.cz

Nabočany is a municipality and village in Chrudim District in the Pardubice Region of the Czech Republic. It has about 100 inhabitants.

== Demographics ==
Historical population
| Year | Pop. | ±% |
|---|---|---|
| 1869 | 304 | — |
| 1880 | 341 | +12.2% |
| 1890 | 316 | −7.3% |
| 1900 | 307 | −2.8% |
| 1910 | 328 | +6.8% |
| 1921 | 320 | −2.4% |
| 1930 | 255 | −20.3% |
| 1950 | 170 | −33.3% |
| 1961 | 192 | +12.9% |
| 1970 | 182 | −5.2% |
| 1980 | 145 | −20.3% |
| 1991 | 128 | −11.7% |
| 2001 | 122 | −4.7% |
| 2011 | 106 | −13.1% |
| 2021 | 125 | +17.9% |
Source: Censuses
