= Staré Jesenčany =

- Municipality
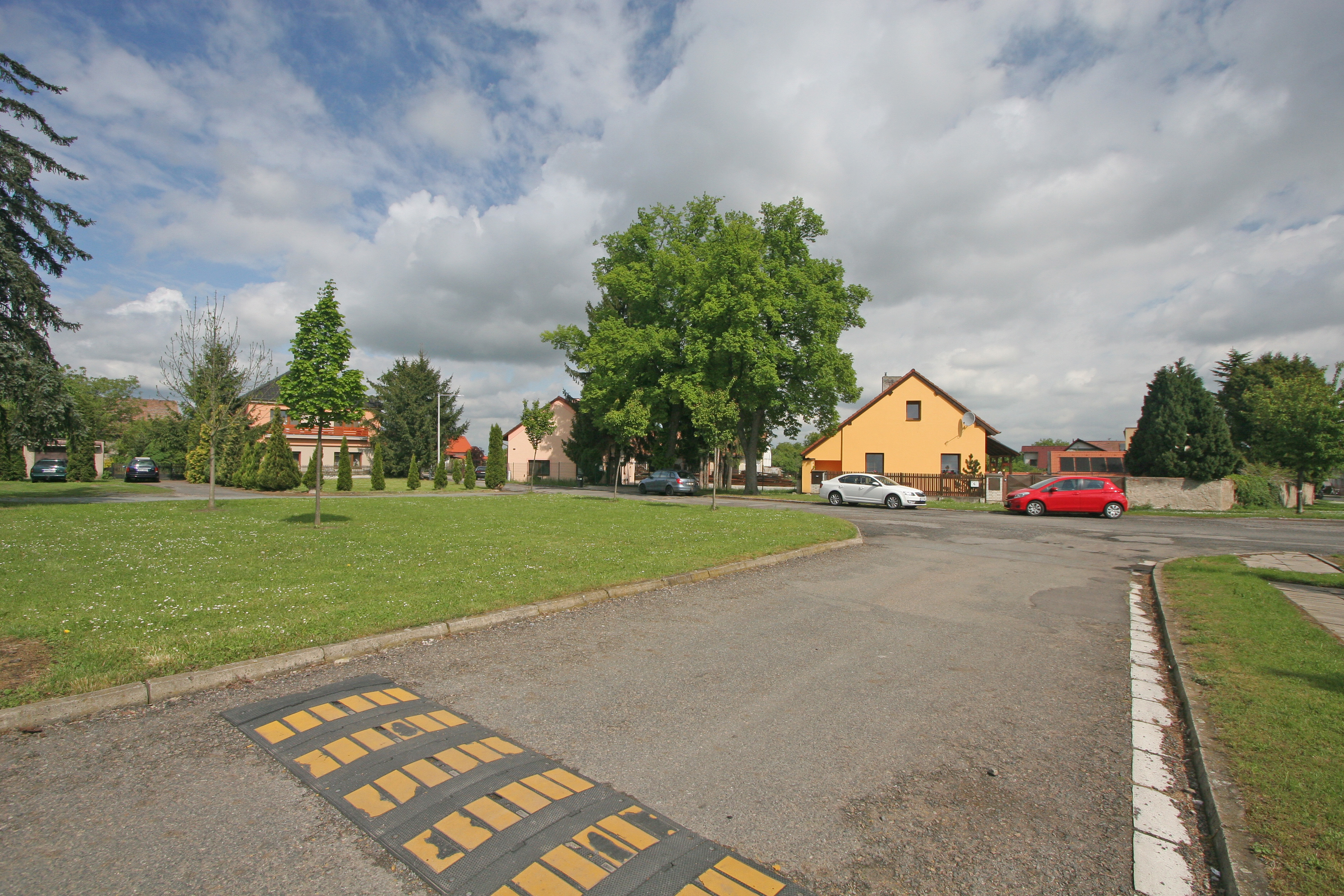
- Centre of Staré Jesenčany

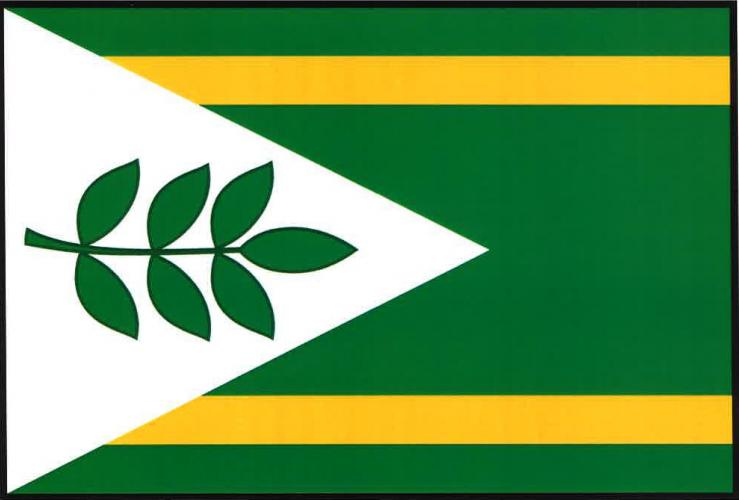
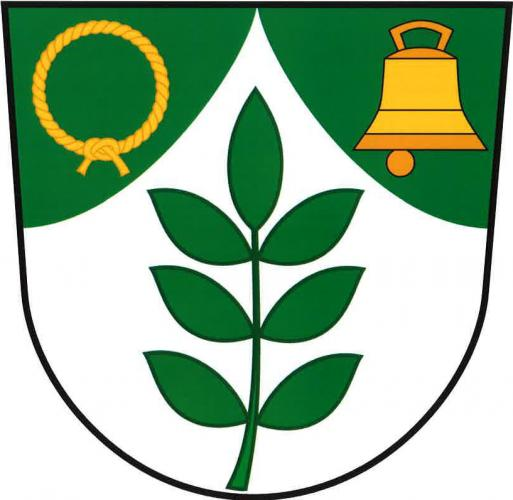
- Flag Coat of arms

- Location in the Czech Republic
- Coordinates: 50°0′2″N 15°45′15″E
- Country: Czech Republic
- Region: Pardubice
- District: Pardubice
- First mentioned: 1384

Area
  - Total: 3.71 km^{2} (1.43 sq mi)
- Elevation: 229 m (751 ft)

Population (2026-01-01)
  - Total: 421
  - Density: 113/km^{2} (294/sq mi)
- Time zone: UTC+1 (CET)
  - Summer (DST): UTC+2 (CEST)
- Postal code: 530 02
- Website: www.starejesencany.cz

Staré Jesenčany is a municipality and village in Pardubice District in the Pardubice Region of the Czech Republic. It has about 400 inhabitants.

== Demographics ==
Historical population
Year	Pop.	±%
1869	297	—
1880	353	+18.9%
1890	423	+19.8%
1900	366	−13.5%
1910	343	−6.3%
1921	376	+9.6%
1930	387	+2.9%
1950	284	−26.6%
1961	316	+11.3%
1970	292	−7.6%
1980	303	+3.8%
1991	252	−16.8%
2001	240	−4.8%
2011	346	+44.2%
2021	477	+37.9%
Source: Censuses
