= Jezbořice =

- Municipality
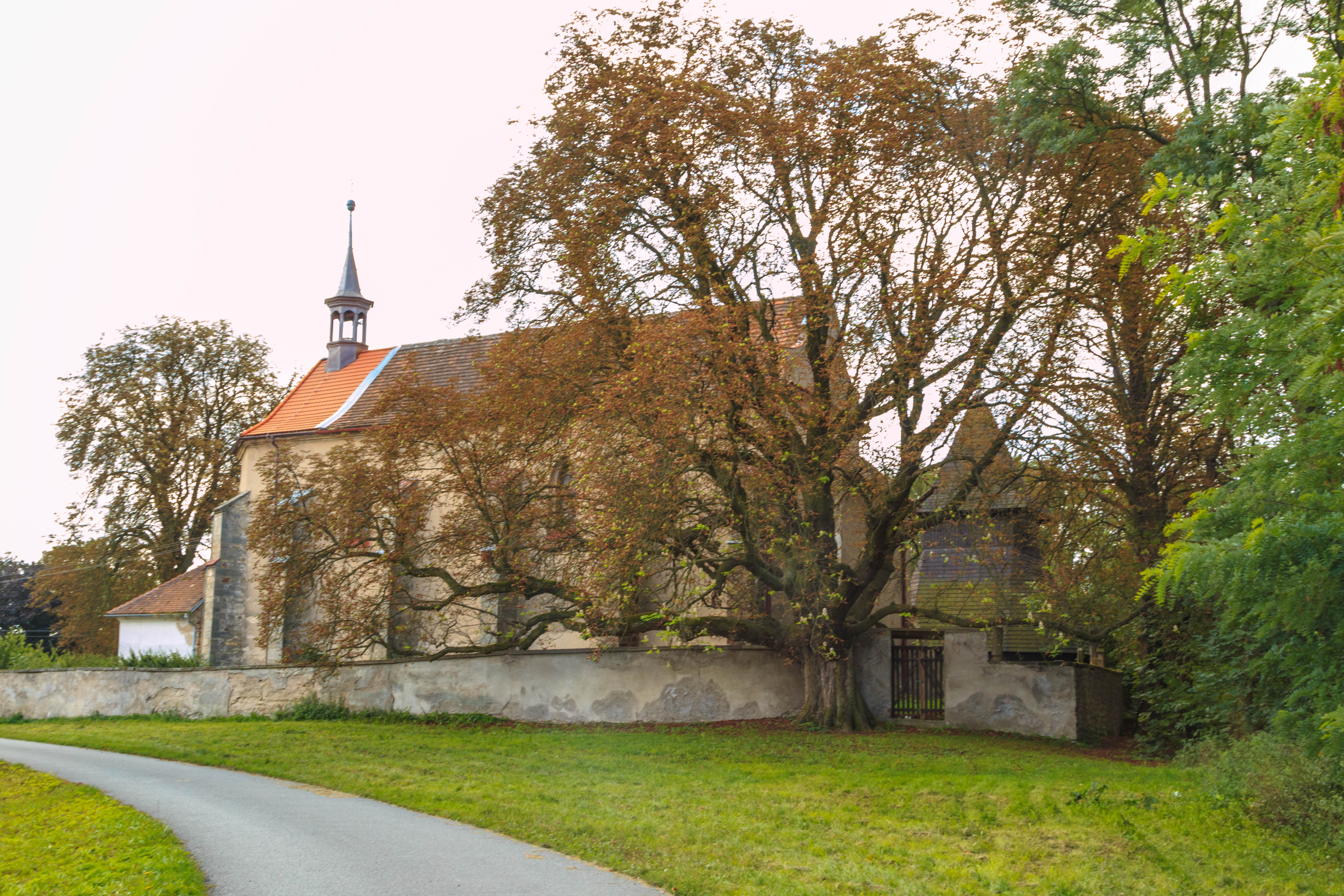
- Church of Saint Wenceslaus

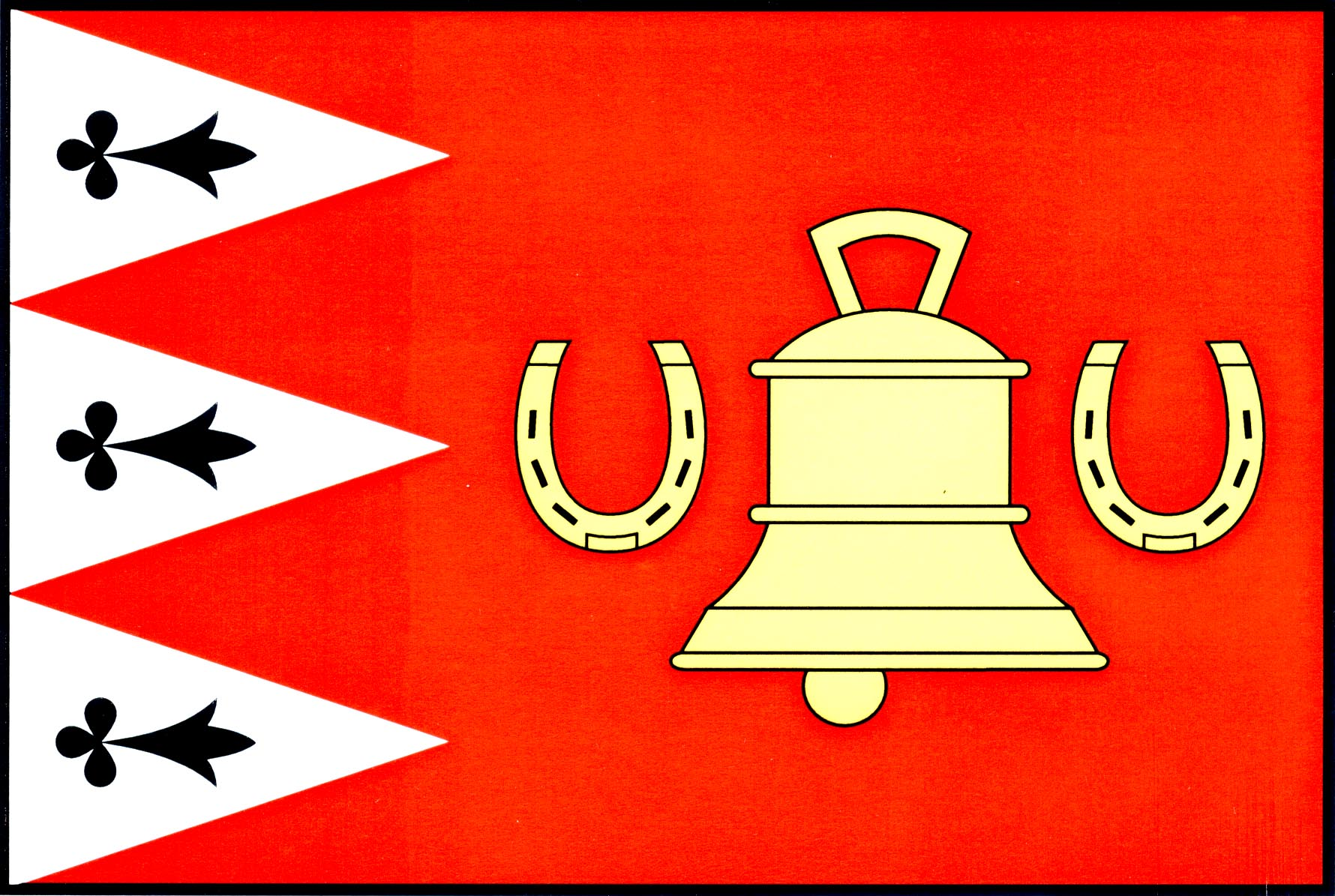
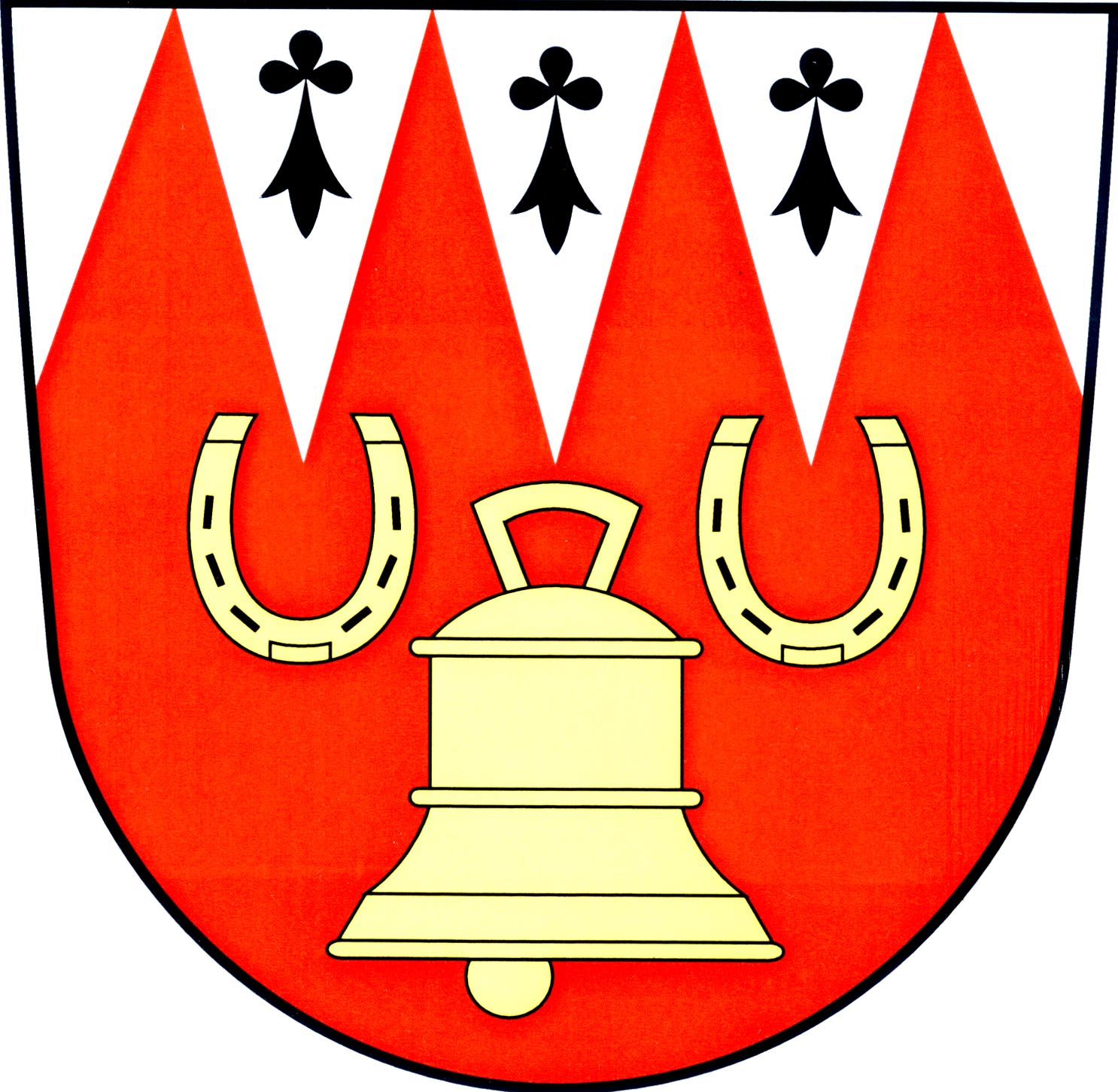
- Flag Coat of arms

- Location in the Czech Republic
- Coordinates: 49°58′50″N 15°41′41″E
- Country: Czech Republic
- Region: Pardubice
- District: Pardubice
- First mentioned: 1131

Area
  - Total: 4.37 km^{2} (1.69 sq mi)
- Elevation: 268 m (879 ft)

Population (2026-01-01)
  - Total: 397
  - Density: 90.8/km^{2} (235/sq mi)
- Time zone: UTC+1 (CET)
  - Summer (DST): UTC+2 (CEST)
- Postal code: 530 02
- Website: jezborice.cz

Jezbořice is a municipality and village in Pardubice District in the Pardubice Region of the Czech Republic. It has about 400 inhabitants.

== Demographics ==
Historical population
Year	Pop.	±%
1869	339	—
1880	432	+27.4%
1890	428	−0.9%
1900	357	−16.6%
1910	374	+4.8%
1921	366	−2.1%
1930	391	+6.8%
1950	301	−23.0%
1961	308	+2.3%
1970	321	+4.2%
1980	299	−6.9%
1991	300	+0.3%
2001	295	−1.7%
2011	349	+18.3%
2021	388	+11.2%
Source: Censuses
