= Čeperka =

- Municipality
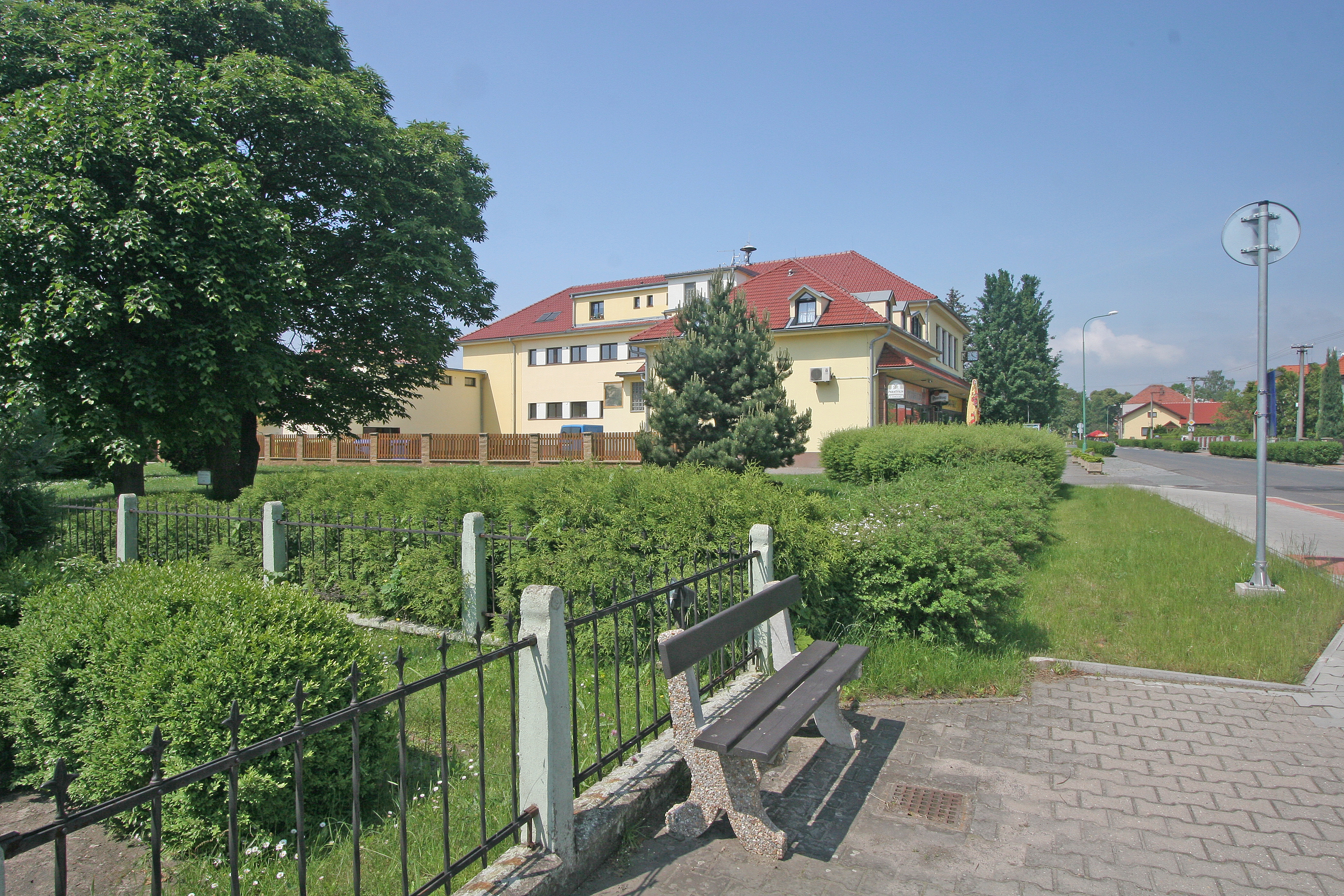
- Municipal office

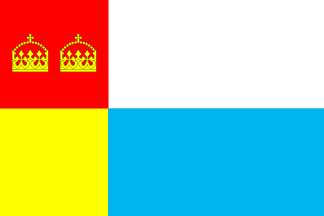
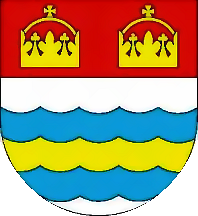
- Flag Coat of arms

- Location in the Czech Republic
- Coordinates: 50°7′59″N 15°46′24″E
- Country: Czech Republic
- Region: Pardubice
- District: Pardubice
- First mentioned: 1777

Area
  - Total: 11.33 km^{2} (4.37 sq mi)
- Elevation: 225 m (738 ft)

Population (2026-01-01)
  - Total: 1,191
  - Density: 105.1/km^{2} (272.3/sq mi)
- Time zone: UTC+1 (CET)
  - Summer (DST): UTC+2 (CEST)
- Postal code: 533 45
- Website: www.ceperka.cz

Čeperka is a municipality and village in Pardubice District in the Pardubice Region of the Czech Republic. It has about 1,200 inhabitants.

== Demographics ==
Historical population
Year	Pop.	±%
1869	453	—
1880	533	+17.7%
1890	556	+4.3%
1900	551	−0.9%
1910	592	+7.4%
1921	557	−5.9%
1930	709	+27.3%
1950	841	+18.6%
1961	786	−6.5%
1970	793	+0.9%
1980	825	+4.0%
1991	854	+3.5%
2001	927	+8.5%
2011	1,013	+9.3%
2021	1,185	+17.0%
Source: Censuses
