= Třebosice =

- Municipality
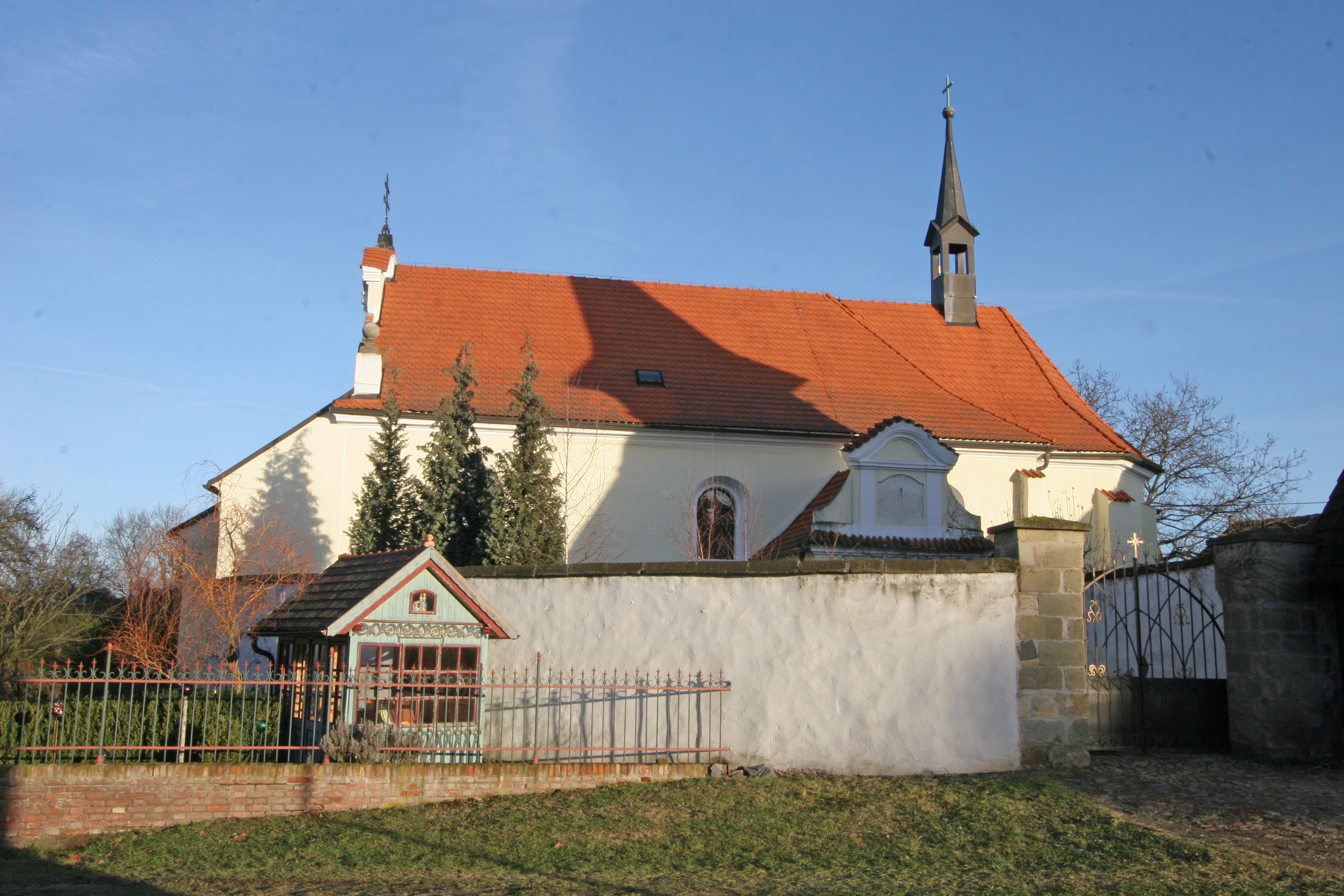
- Church of the Exaltation of the Holy Cross

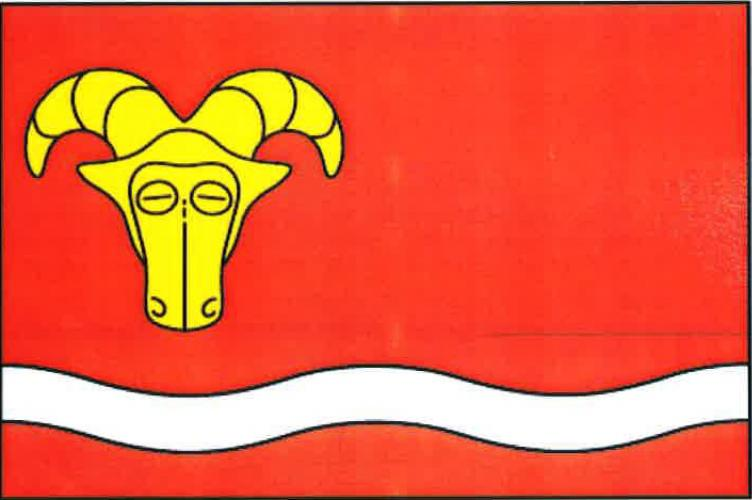
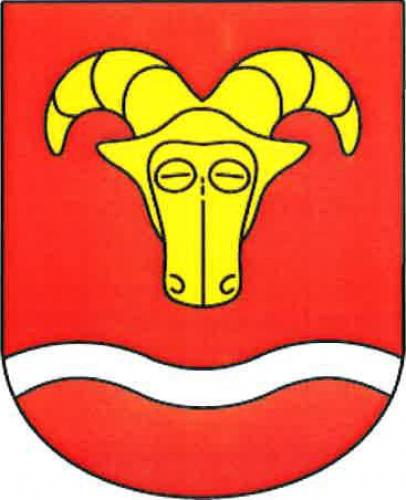
- Flag Coat of arms

- Location in the Czech Republic
- Coordinates: 49°59′50″N 15°44′6″E
- Country: Czech Republic
- Region: Pardubice
- District: Pardubice
- First mentioned: 1319

Area
  - Total: 3.18 km^{2} (1.23 sq mi)
- Elevation: 233 m (764 ft)

Population (2026-01-01)
  - Total: 253
  - Density: 79.6/km^{2} (206/sq mi)
- Time zone: UTC+1 (CET)
  - Summer (DST): UTC+2 (CEST)
- Postal code: 530 02
- Website: www.trebosice.cz

Třebosice is a municipality and village in Pardubice District in the Pardubice Region of the Czech Republic. It has about 300 inhabitants.

== Demographics ==
Historical population
Year	Pop.	±%
1869	259	—
1880	279	+7.7%
1890	312	+11.8%
1900	268	−14.1%
1910	284	+6.0%
1921	263	−7.4%
1930	237	−9.9%
1950	180	−24.1%
1961	176	−2.2%
1970	142	−19.3%
1980	131	−7.7%
1991	115	−12.2%
2001	152	+32.2%
2011	182	+19.7%
2021	272	+49.5%
Source: Censuses
