= Honbice =

- Municipality
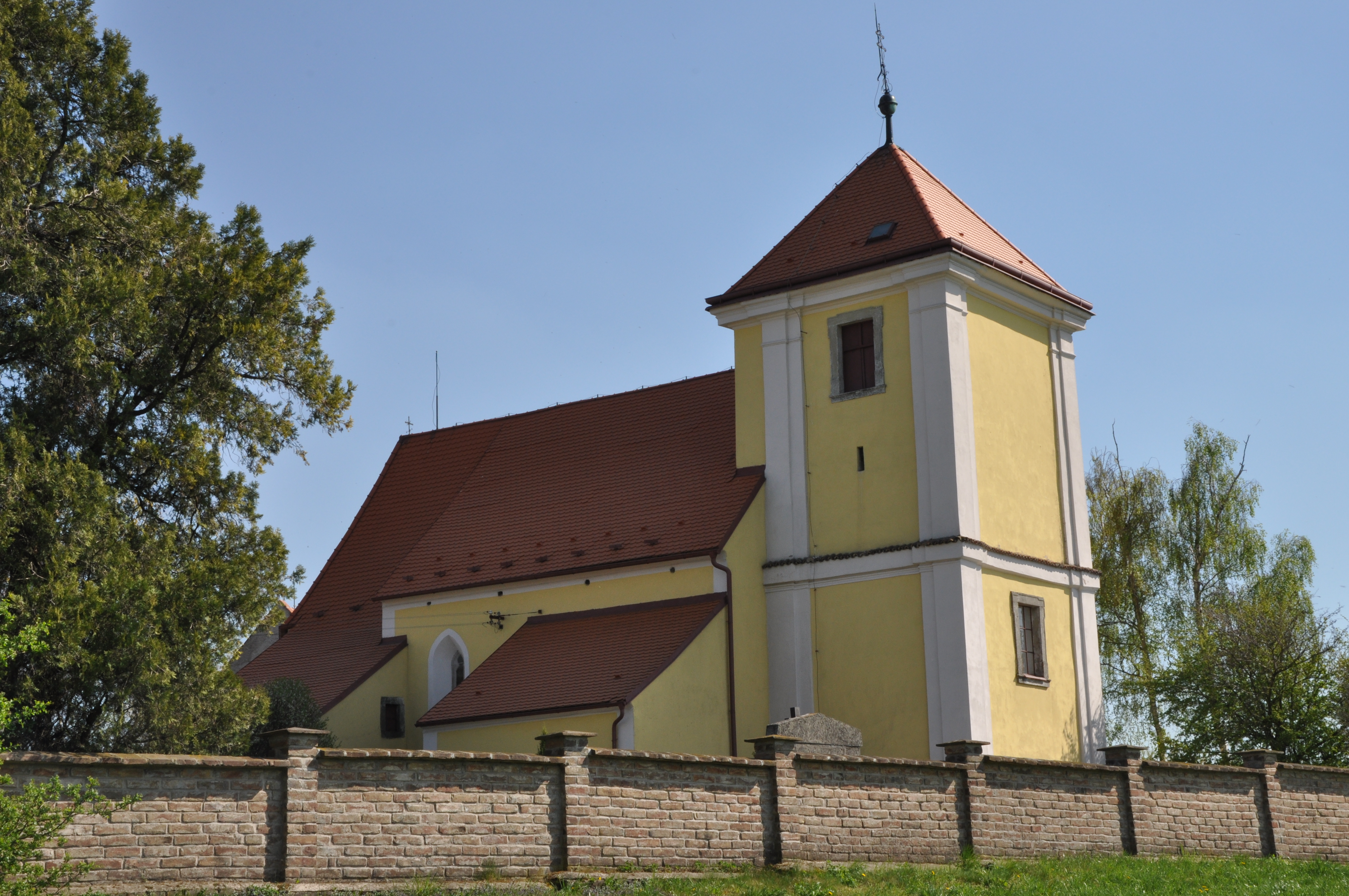
- Church of the Exaltation of the Holy Cross

- Location in the Czech Republic
- Coordinates: 49°56′0″N 15°53′35″E
- Country: Czech Republic
- Region: Pardubice
- District: Chrudim
- First mentioned: 1244

Area
  - Total: 4.85 km^{2} (1.87 sq mi)
- Elevation: 277 m (909 ft)

Population (2026-01-01)
  - Total: 166
  - Density: 34.2/km^{2} (88.6/sq mi)
- Time zone: UTC+1 (CET)
  - Summer (DST): UTC+2 (CEST)
- Postal code: 538 62
- Website: www.honbice.cz

Honbice is a municipality and village in Chrudim District in the Pardubice Region of the Czech Republic. It has about 200 inhabitants.

== Administrative division ==
Honbice consists of two municipal parts (in brackets population according to the 2021 census):

- Honbice (97)
- Libanice (71)

== Demographics ==
Historical population
Year	Pop.	±%
1869	503	—
1880	591	+17.5%
1890	583	−1.4%
1900	516	−11.5%
1910	528	+2.3%
1921	490	−7.2%
1930	420	−14.3%
1950	309	−26.4%
1961	310	+0.3%
1970	286	−7.7%
1980	233	−18.5%
1991	171	−26.6%
2001	186	+8.8%
2011	165	−11.3%
2021	168	+1.8%
Source: Censuses
