= Pravy =

- Municipality
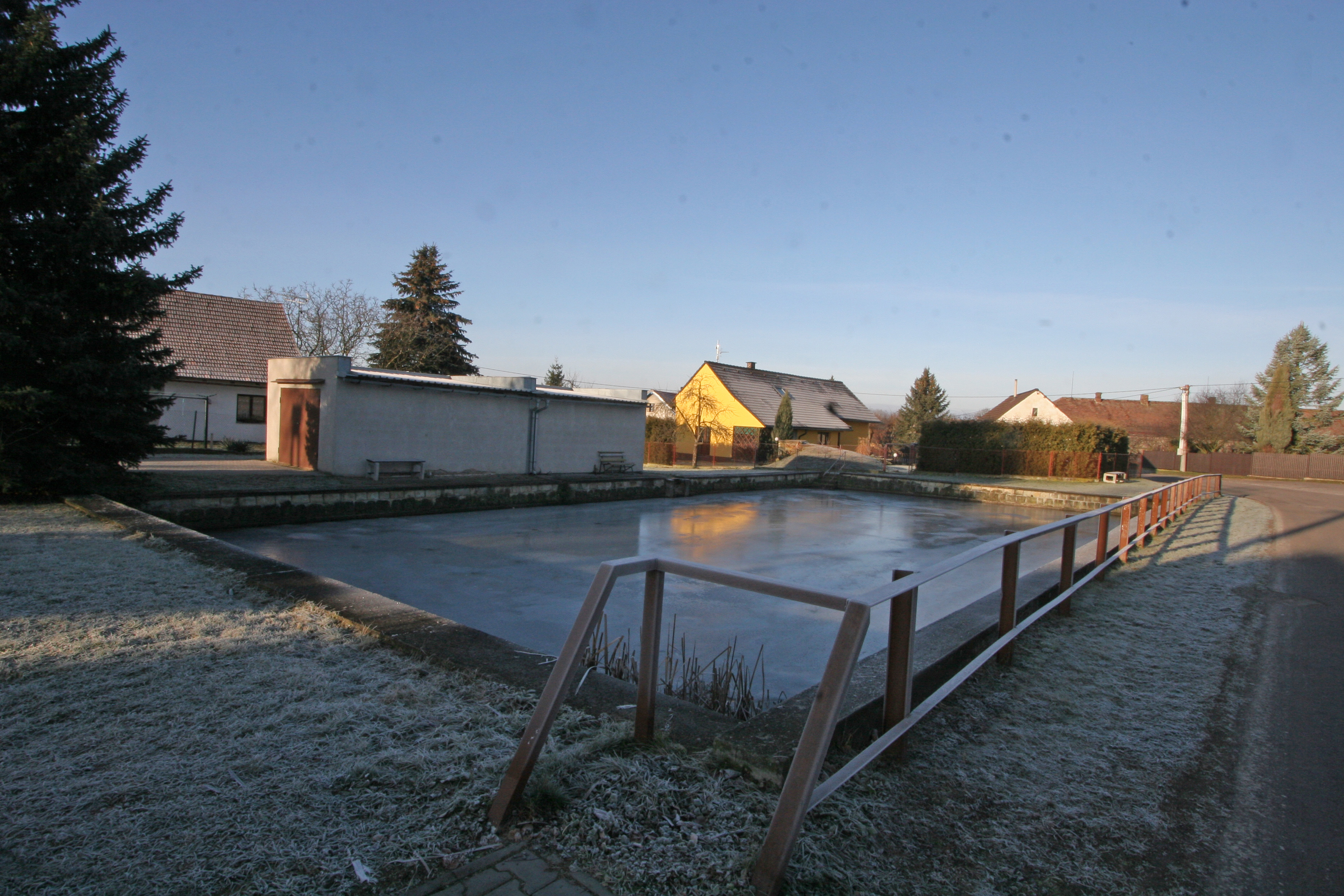
- Water tank

- Location in the Czech Republic
- Coordinates: 50°7′55″N 15°37′27″E
- Country: Czech Republic
- Region: Pardubice
- District: Pardubice
- First mentioned: 1414

Area
  - Total: 3.80 km^{2} (1.47 sq mi)
- Elevation: 265 m (869 ft)

Population (2026-01-01)
  - Total: 113
  - Density: 29.7/km^{2} (77.0/sq mi)
- Time zone: UTC+1 (CET)
  - Summer (DST): UTC+2 (CEST)
- Postal code: 533 41
- Website: www.pravy.cz

Pravy is a municipality and village in Pardubice District in the Pardubice Region of the Czech Republic. It has about 100 inhabitants.

== Demographics ==
Historical population
Year	Pop.	±%
1869	202	—
1880	217	+7.4%
1890	230	+6.0%
1900	231	+0.4%
1910	241	+4.3%
1921	230	−4.6%
1930	212	−7.8%
1950	133	−37.3%
1961	123	−7.5%
1970	107	−13.0%
1980	105	−1.9%
1991	88	−16.2%
2001	83	−5.7%
2011	98	+18.1%
2021	113	+15.3%
Source: Censuses
