= Klešice =

- Municipality
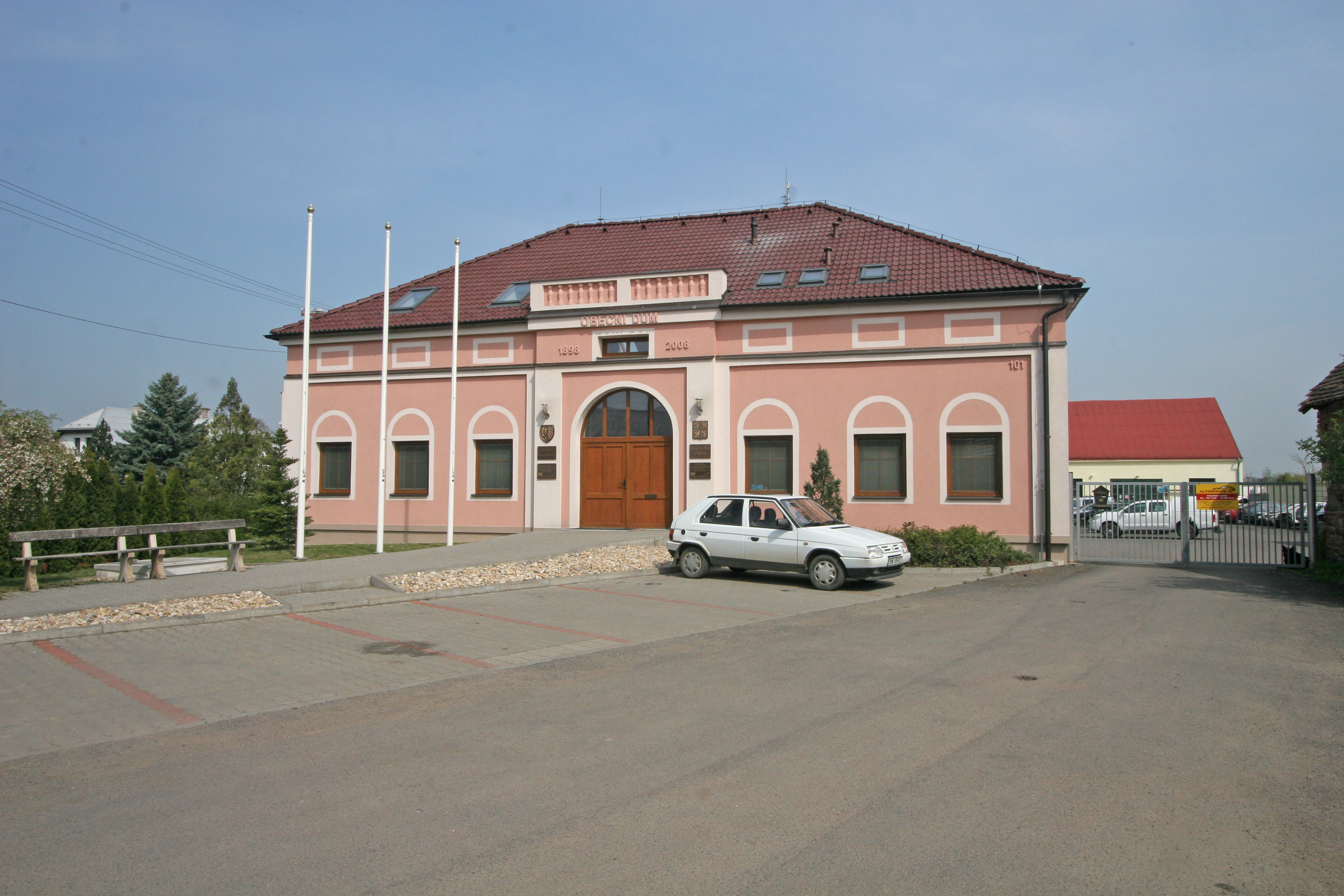
- Municipal office

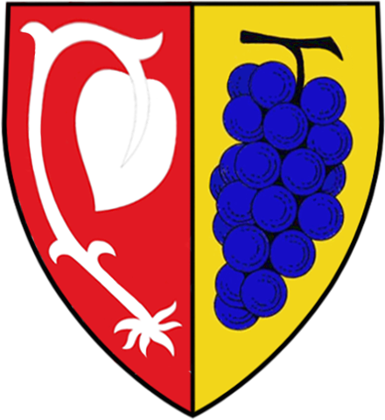
- Flag Coat of arms

- Location in the Czech Republic
- Coordinates: 49°57′49″N 15°40′53″E
- Country: Czech Republic
- Region: Pardubice
- District: Chrudim
- First mentioned: 1257

Area
  - Total: 4.66 km^{2} (1.80 sq mi)
- Elevation: 252 m (827 ft)

Population (2026-01-01)
  - Total: 433
  - Density: 92.9/km^{2} (241/sq mi)
- Time zone: UTC+1 (CET)
  - Summer (DST): UTC+2 (CEST)
- Postal code: 538 03
- Website: www.klesice.cz

Klešice is a municipality and village in Chrudim District in the Pardubice Region of the Czech Republic. It has about 400 inhabitants.

== Administrative division ==
Klešice consists of two municipal parts (in brackets population according to the 2021 census):

- Klešice (327)
- Nákle (71)

== Demographics ==
Historical population
Year	Pop.	±%
1869	392	—
1880	410	+4.6%
1890	404	−1.5%
1900	389	−3.7%
1910	386	−0.8%
1921	401	+3.9%
1930	384	−4.2%
1950	286	−25.5%
1961	307	+7.3%
1970	262	−14.7%
1980	241	−8.0%
1991	244	+1.2%
2001	279	+14.3%
2011	380	+36.2%
2021	398	+4.7%
Source: Censuses
