= Starý Mateřov =

- Municipality
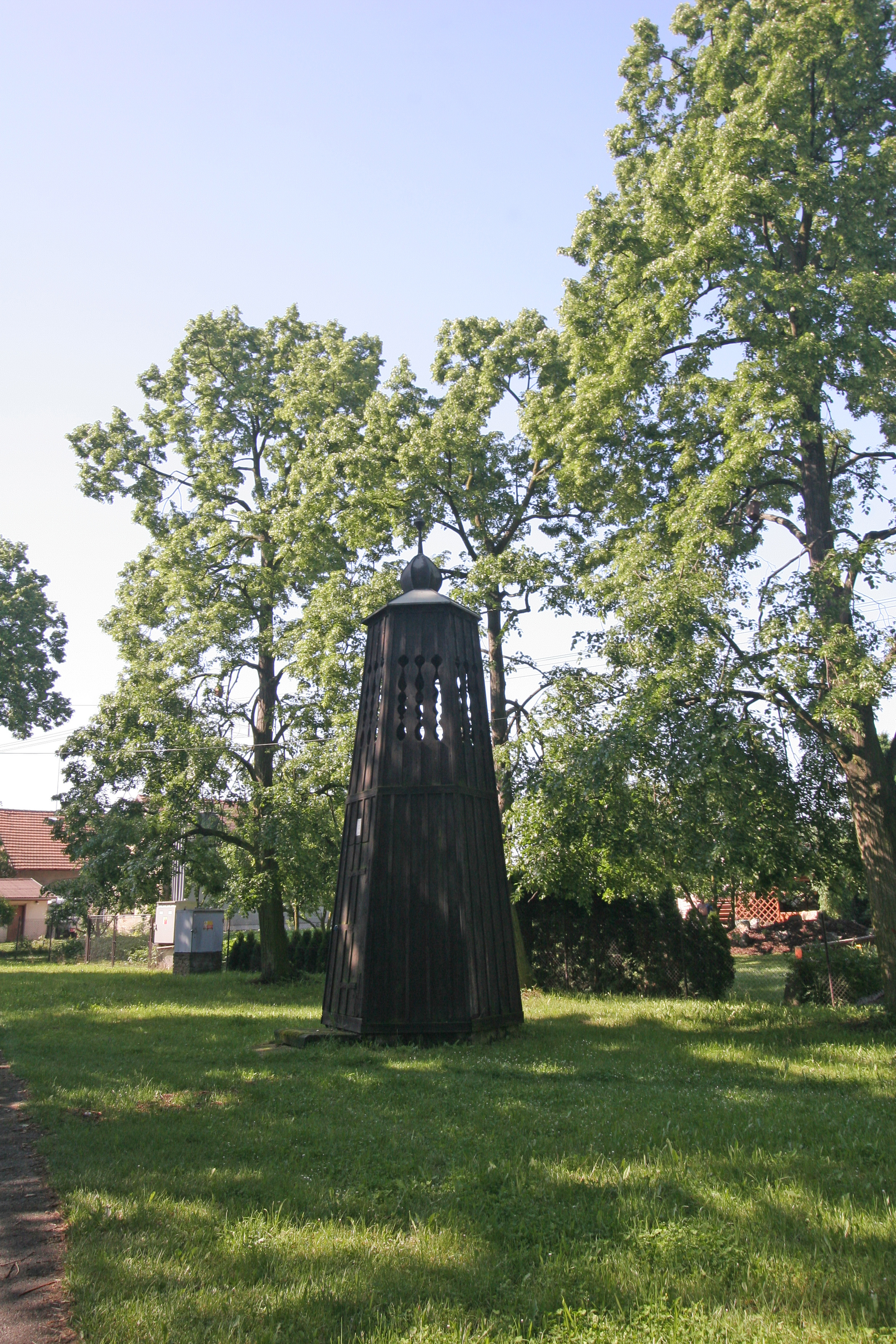
- Wooden belfry

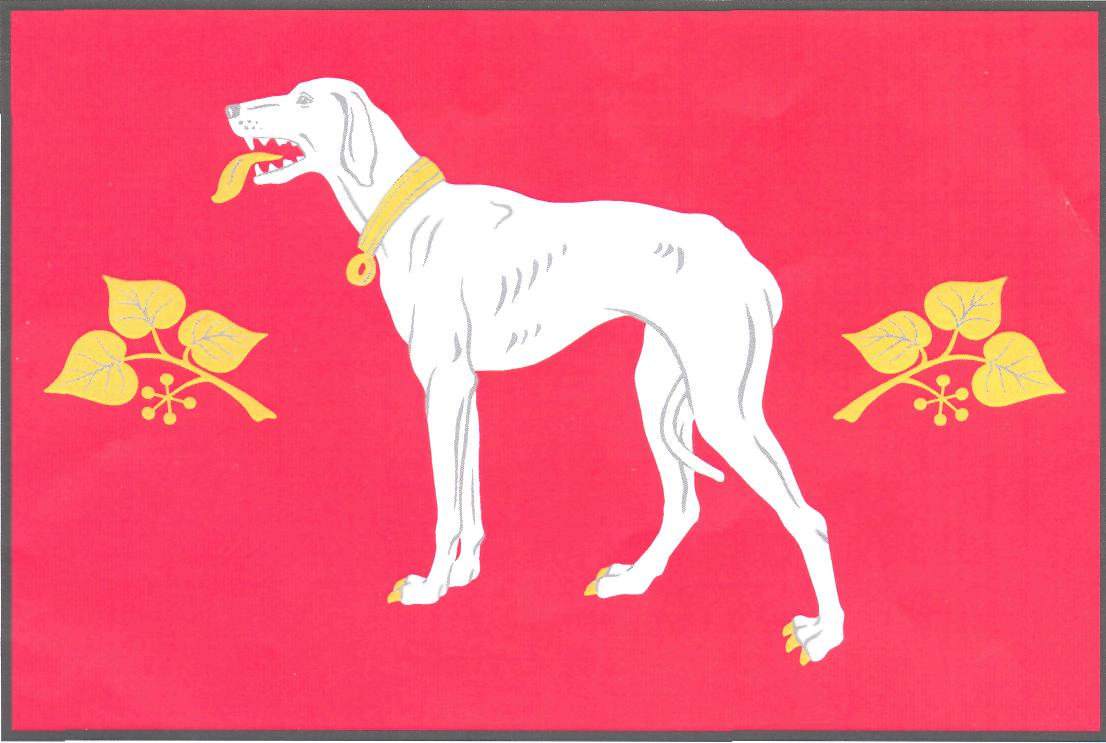
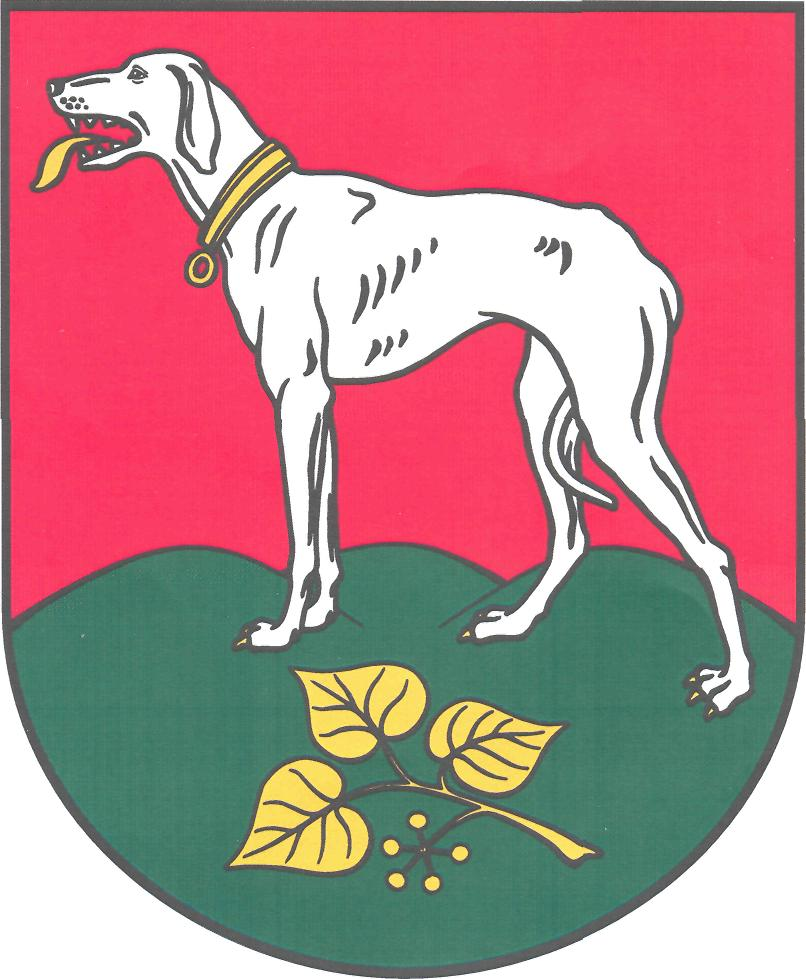
- Flag Coat of arms

- Location in the Czech Republic
- Coordinates: 50°0′6″N 15°42′55″E
- Country: Czech Republic
- Region: Pardubice
- District: Pardubice
- First mentioned: 1227

Area
  - Total: 3.02 km^{2} (1.17 sq mi)
- Elevation: 229 m (751 ft)

Population (2026-01-01)
  - Total: 944
  - Density: 313/km^{2} (810/sq mi)
- Time zone: UTC+1 (CET)
  - Summer (DST): UTC+2 (CEST)
- Postal code: 530 02
- Website: www.starymaterov.cz

Starý Mateřov is a municipality and village in Pardubice District in the Pardubice Region of the Czech Republic. It has about 900 inhabitants.

== Demographics ==
Historical population
Year	Pop.	±%
1869	425	—
1880	396	−6.8%
1890	385	−2.8%
1900	395	+2.6%
1910	432	+9.4%
1921	477	+10.4%
1930	444	−6.9%
1950	418	−5.9%
1961	431	+3.1%
1970	408	−5.3%
1980	400	−2.0%
1991	334	−16.5%
2001	322	−3.6%
2011	518	+60.9%
2021	808	+56.0%
Source: Censuses
