= Načešice =

- Municipality
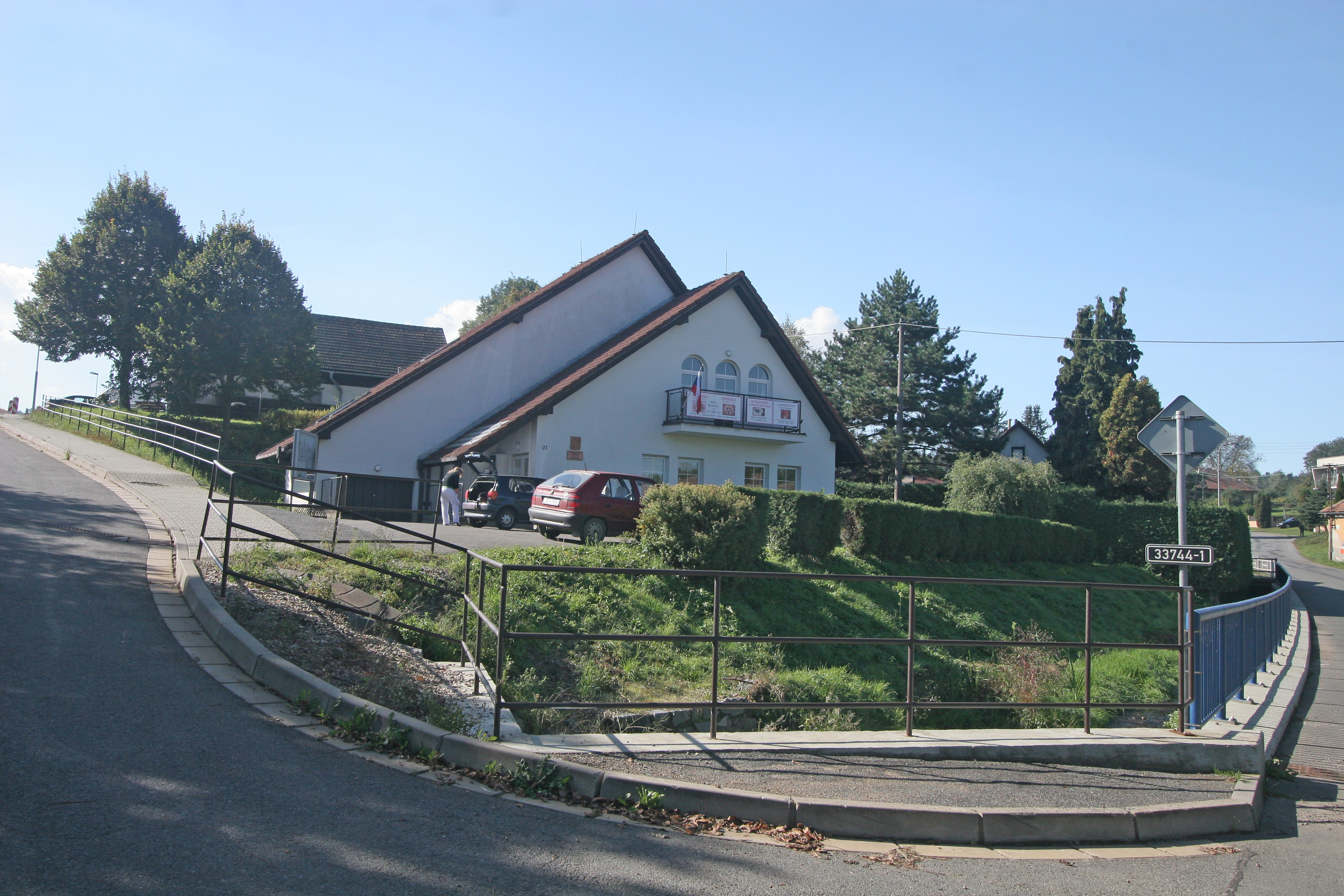
- Municipal office

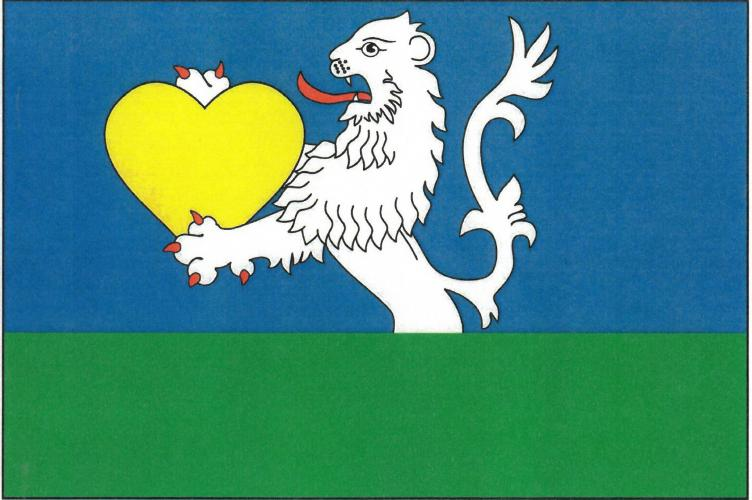
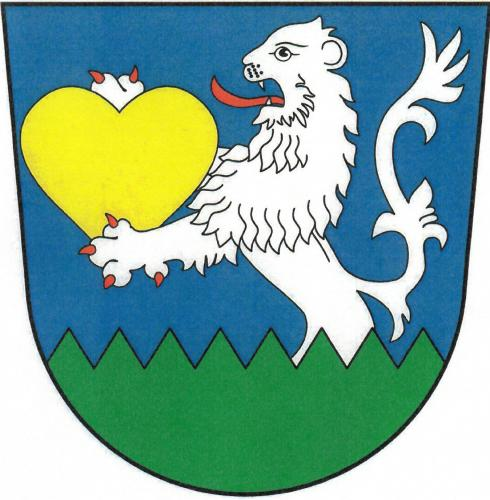
- Flag Coat of arms

- Location in the Czech Republic
- Coordinates: 49°56′29″N 15°37′44″E
- Country: Czech Republic
- Region: Pardubice
- District: Chrudim
- First mentioned: 1382

Area
  - Total: 9.04 km^{2} (3.49 sq mi)
- Elevation: 323 m (1,060 ft)

Population (2026-01-01)
  - Total: 681
  - Density: 75.3/km^{2} (195/sq mi)
- Time zone: UTC+1 (CET)
  - Summer (DST): UTC+2 (CEST)
- Postal code: 538 03
- Website: www.nacesice.eu

Načešice is a municipality and village in Chrudim District in the Pardubice Region of the Czech Republic. It has about 700 inhabitants.

== Administrative division ==
Načešice consists of two municipal parts (in brackets population according to the 2021 census):

- Načešice (506)
- Licomělice (128)

== Demographics ==
Historical population
Year	Pop.	±%
1869	662	—
1880	651	−1.7%
1890	711	+9.2%
1900	672	−5.5%
1910	700	+4.2%
1921	680	−2.9%
1930	632	−7.1%
1950	482	−23.7%
1961	468	−2.9%
1970	491	+4.9%
1980	507	+3.3%
1991	505	−0.4%
2001	520	+3.0%
2011	551	+6.0%
2021	634	+15.1%
Source: Censuses
