= Plch =

- Municipality
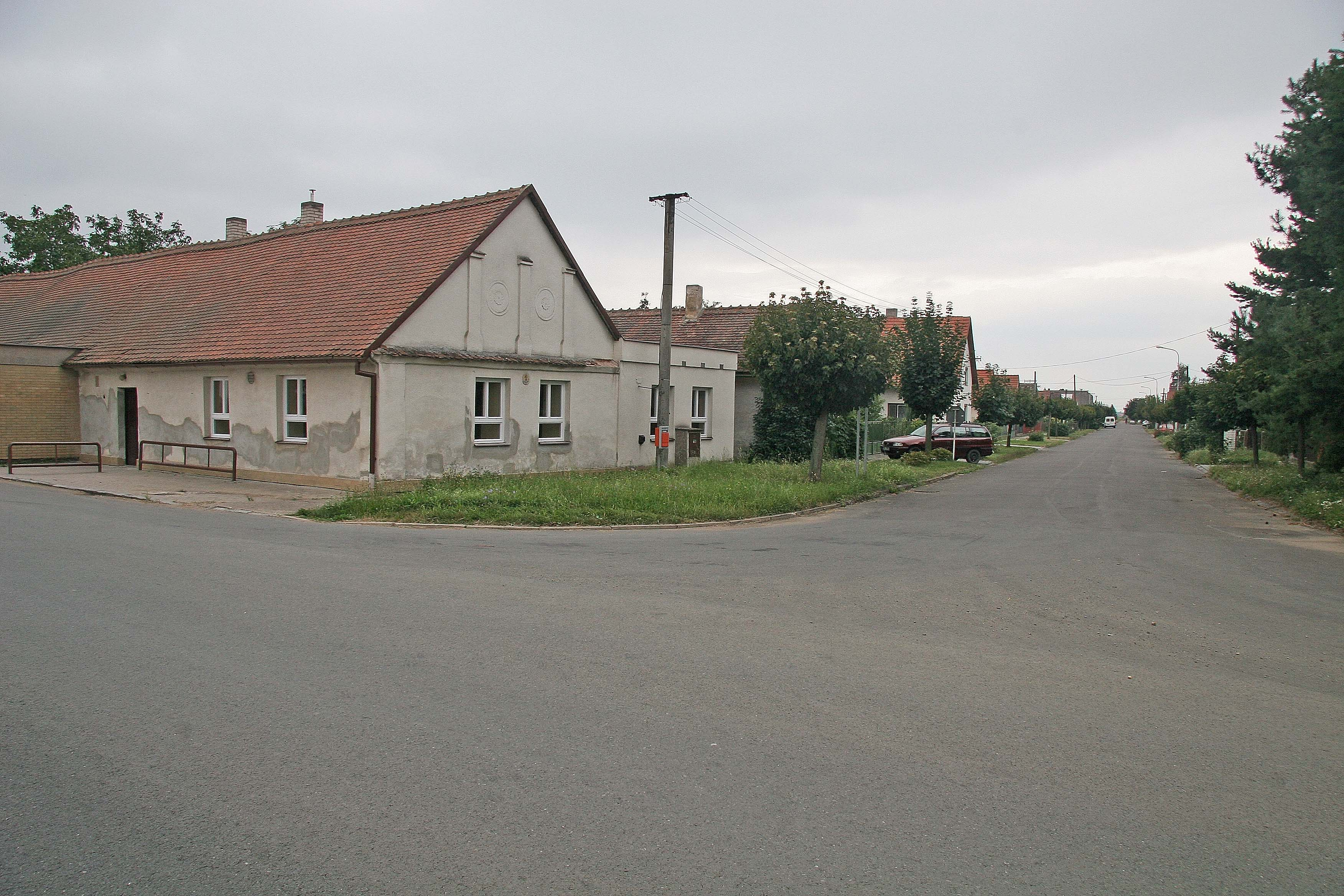
- Crossroads

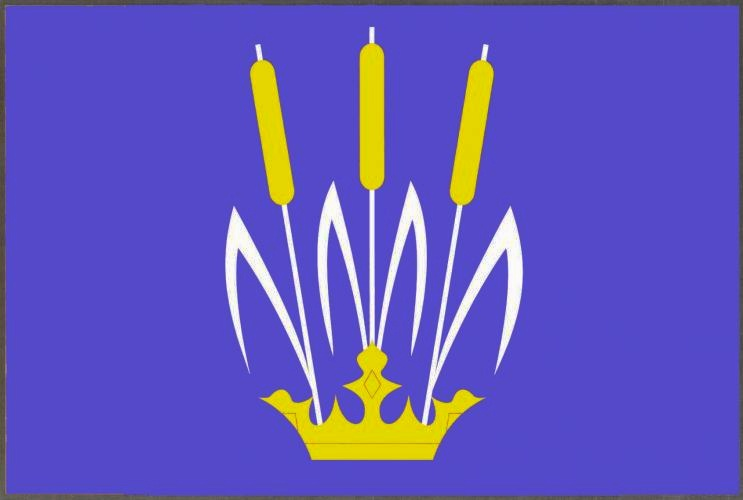
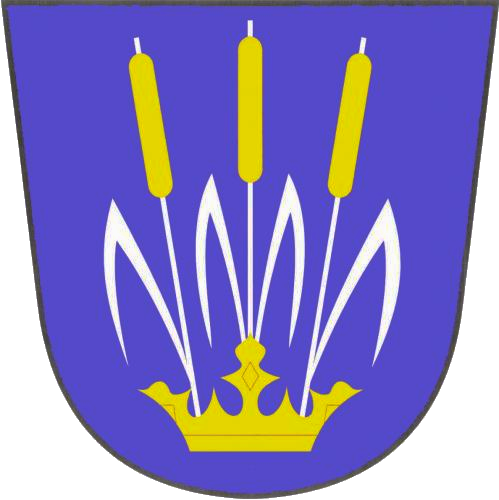
- Flag Coat of arms

- Location in the Czech Republic
- Coordinates: 50°7′44″N 15°42′10″E
- Country: Czech Republic
- Region: Pardubice
- District: Pardubice
- Founded: 1777

Area
  - Total: 0.96 km^{2} (0.37 sq mi)
- Elevation: 226 m (741 ft)

Population (2026-01-01)
  - Total: 106
  - Density: 110/km^{2} (290/sq mi)
- Time zone: UTC+1 (CET)
  - Summer (DST): UTC+2 (CEST)
- Postal code: 533 45
- Website: www.obecplch.cz

Plch is a municipality and village in Pardubice District in the Pardubice Region of the Czech Republic. It has about 100 inhabitants.

== Demographics ==
Historical population
Year	Pop.	±%
1869	268	—
1880	268	+0.0%
1890	211	−21.3%
1900	186	−11.8%
1910	200	+7.5%
1921	166	−17.0%
1930	187	+12.7%
1950	155	−17.1%
1961	137	−11.6%
1970	123	−10.2%
1980	99	−19.5%
1991	87	−12.1%
2001	74	−14.9%
2011	96	+29.7%
2021	110	+14.6%
Source: Censuses
