= Michael Špaček (motorcyclist) =

Czech motorcycle racer

Michael Špaček (2 March 1991, in Montélimar – 12 October 2009, in Plzeň) was a Czech youth motocross champion.

== Life and career ==
After Špaček's family returned from exile in Spain, where his father became Spanish champion in Enduro, his family settled in Poběžovice u Holic. Thanks to reality, the family lived 20 meters from the famous motocross track in Holice and owned a part of it. Michael started riding a motorcycle at three years of age. His first race was at the age of seven. In 2007, he was the Junior European Champion in the EMX125 class. He was critically injured during Czech International Team Championship in Loket on 26 September 2009 and died in hospital two weeks later, aged 18.
