= Přelovice =

- Municipality
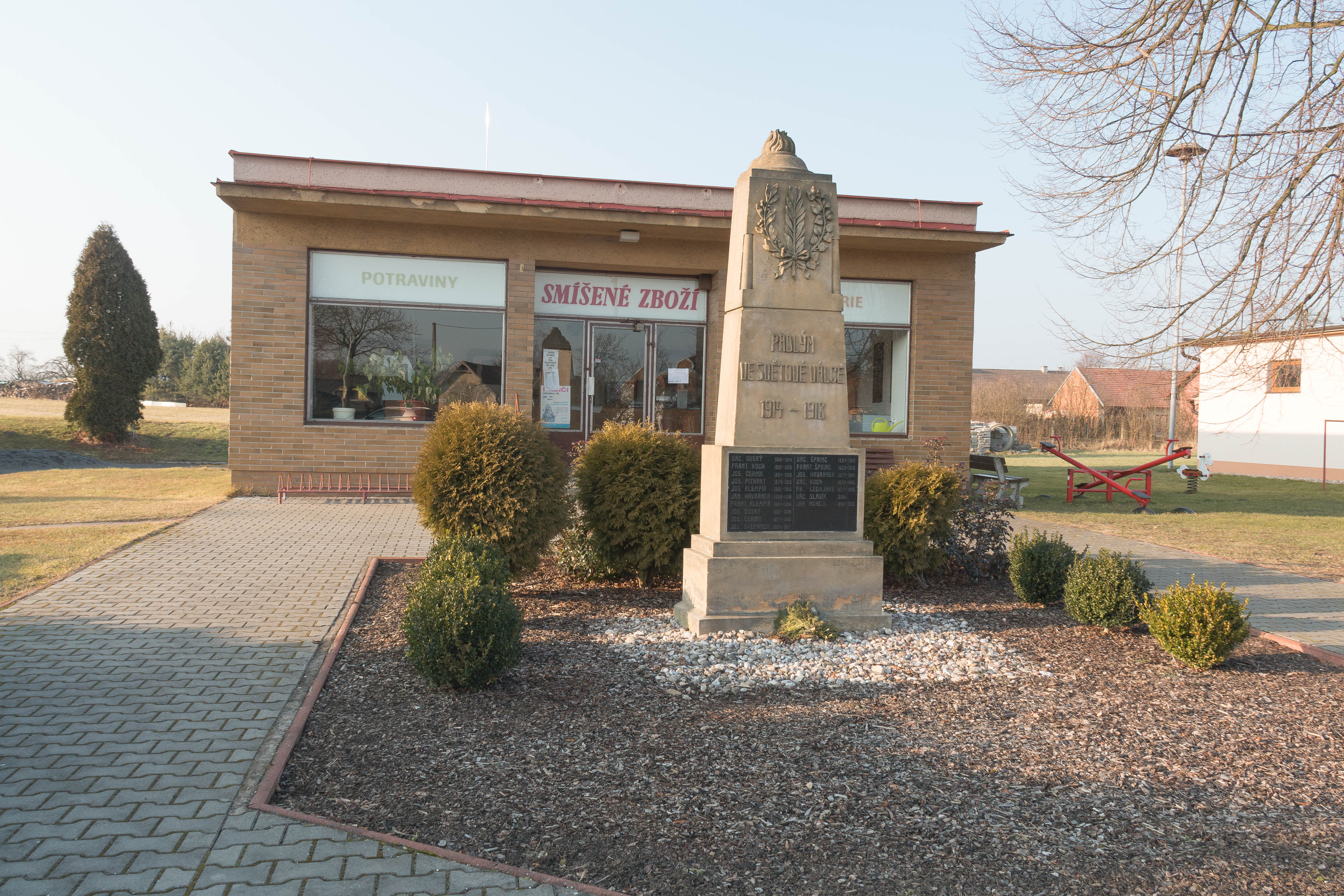
- Memorial to the victims of World War I

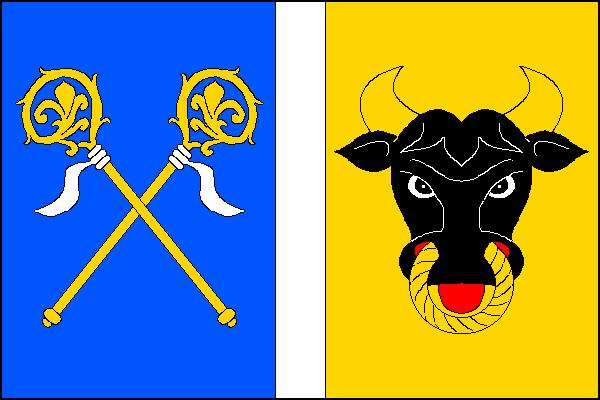
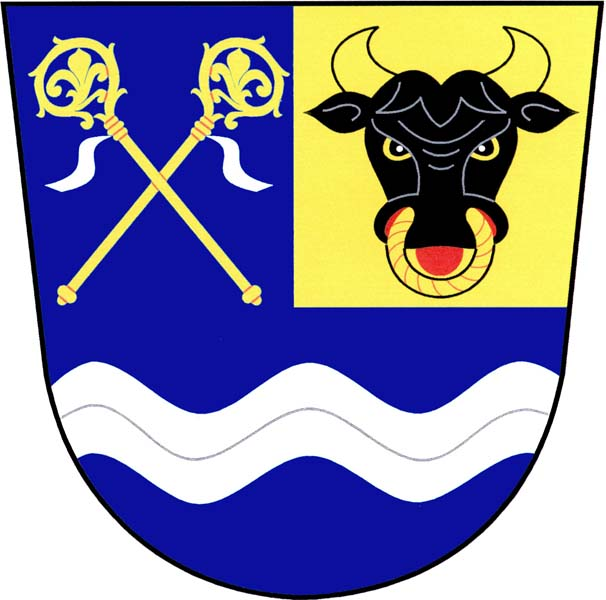
- Flag Coat of arms

- Location in the Czech Republic
- Coordinates: 50°4′22″N 15°36′54″E
- Country: Czech Republic
- Region: Pardubice
- District: Pardubice
- First mentioned: 1366

Area
  - Total: 4.55 km^{2} (1.76 sq mi)
- Elevation: 220 m (720 ft)

Population (2026-01-01)
  - Total: 239
  - Density: 52.5/km^{2} (136/sq mi)
- Time zone: UTC+1 (CET)
  - Summer (DST): UTC+2 (CEST)
- Postal code: 533 41
- Website: www.obecprelovice.cz

Přelovice is a municipality and village in Pardubice District in the Pardubice Region of the Czech Republic. It has about 200 inhabitants.

== Demographics ==
Historical population
| Year | Pop. | ±% |
|---|---|---|
| 1869 | 324 | — |
| 1880 | 370 | +14.2% |
| 1890 | 394 | +6.5% |
| 1900 | 353 | −10.4% |
| 1910 | 401 | +13.6% |
| 1921 | 357 | −11.0% |
| 1930 | 338 | −5.3% |
| 1950 | 302 | −10.7% |
| 1961 | 311 | +3.0% |
| 1970 | 258 | −17.0% |
| 1980 | 223 | −13.6% |
| 1991 | 195 | −12.6% |
| 2001 | 190 | −2.6% |
| 2011 | 197 | +3.7% |
| 2021 | 219 | +11.2% |
Source: Censuses
