= Vlčí Habřina =

- Municipality
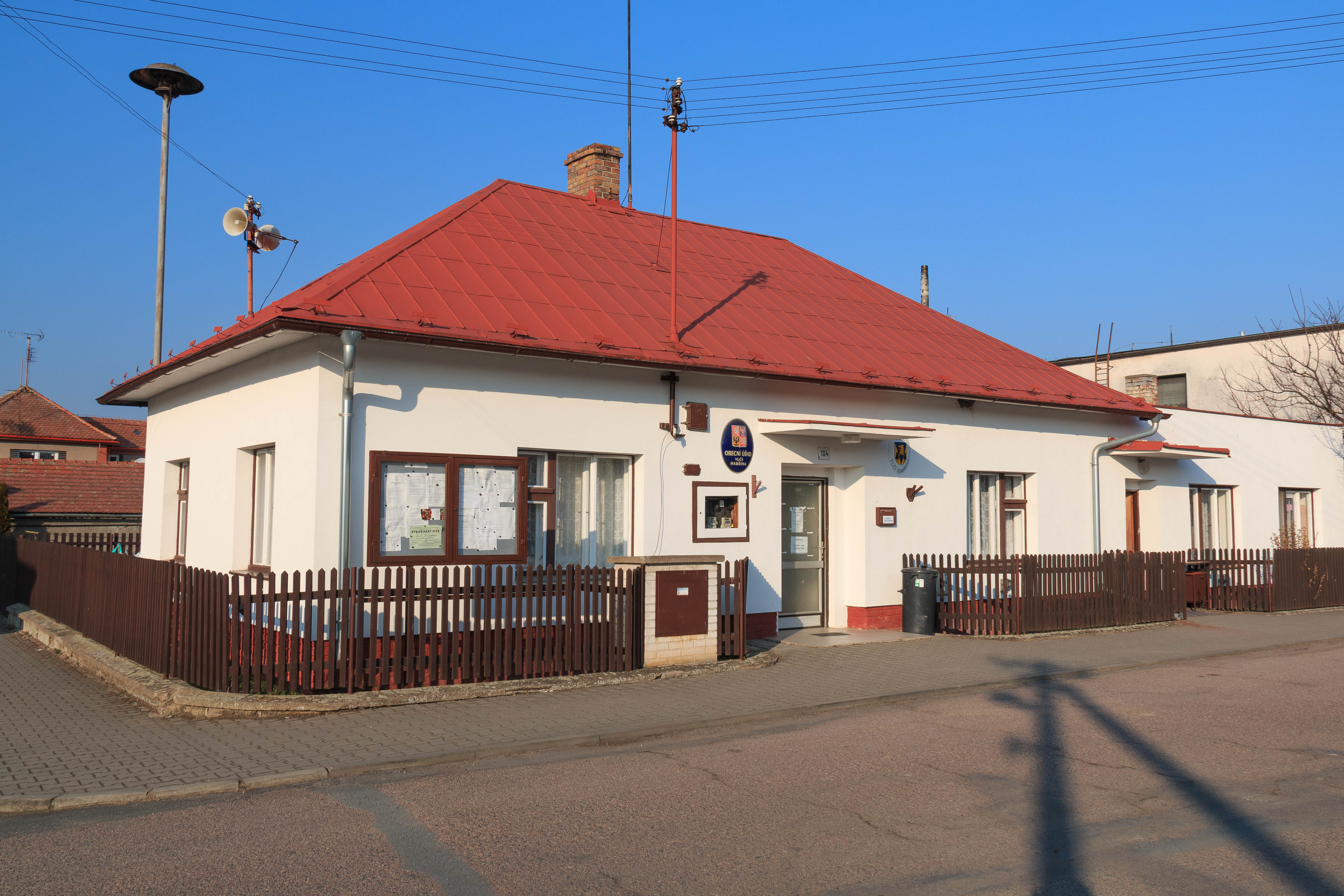
- Municipal office

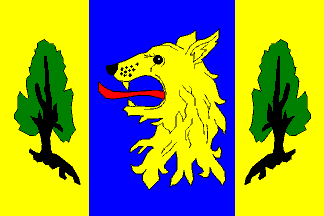
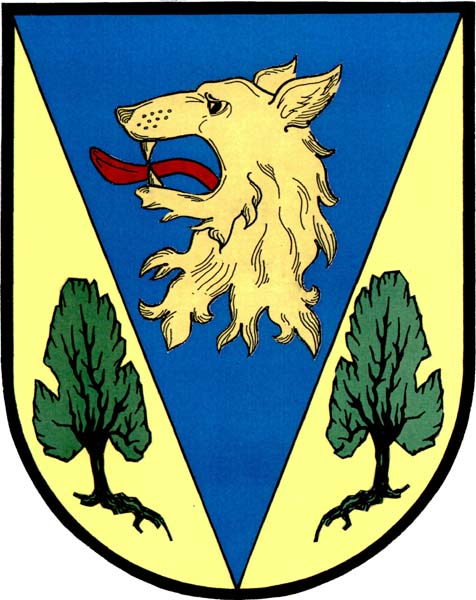
- Flag Coat of arms

- Location in the Czech Republic
- Coordinates: 50°5′9″N 15°35′46″E
- Country: Czech Republic
- Region: Pardubice
- District: Pardubice
- First mentioned: 1436

Area
  - Total: 3.38 km^{2} (1.31 sq mi)
- Elevation: 219 m (719 ft)

Population (2026-01-01)
  - Total: 331
  - Density: 97.9/km^{2} (254/sq mi)
- Time zone: UTC+1 (CET)
  - Summer (DST): UTC+2 (CEST)
- Postal code: 533 41
- Website: www.vlcihabrina.cz

Vlčí Habřina is a municipality and village in Pardubice District in the Pardubice Region of the Czech Republic. It has about 300 inhabitants.

== Demographics ==
Historical population
Year	Pop.	±%
1869	411	—
1880	510	+24.1%
1890	511	+0.2%
1900	504	−1.4%
1910	490	−2.8%
1921	459	−6.3%
1930	453	−1.3%
1950	389	−14.1%
1961	431	+10.8%
1970	393	−8.8%
1980	361	−8.1%
1991	328	−9.1%
2001	320	−2.4%
2011	309	−3.4%
2021	311	+0.6%
Source: Censuses
