= Žáravice =

- Municipality
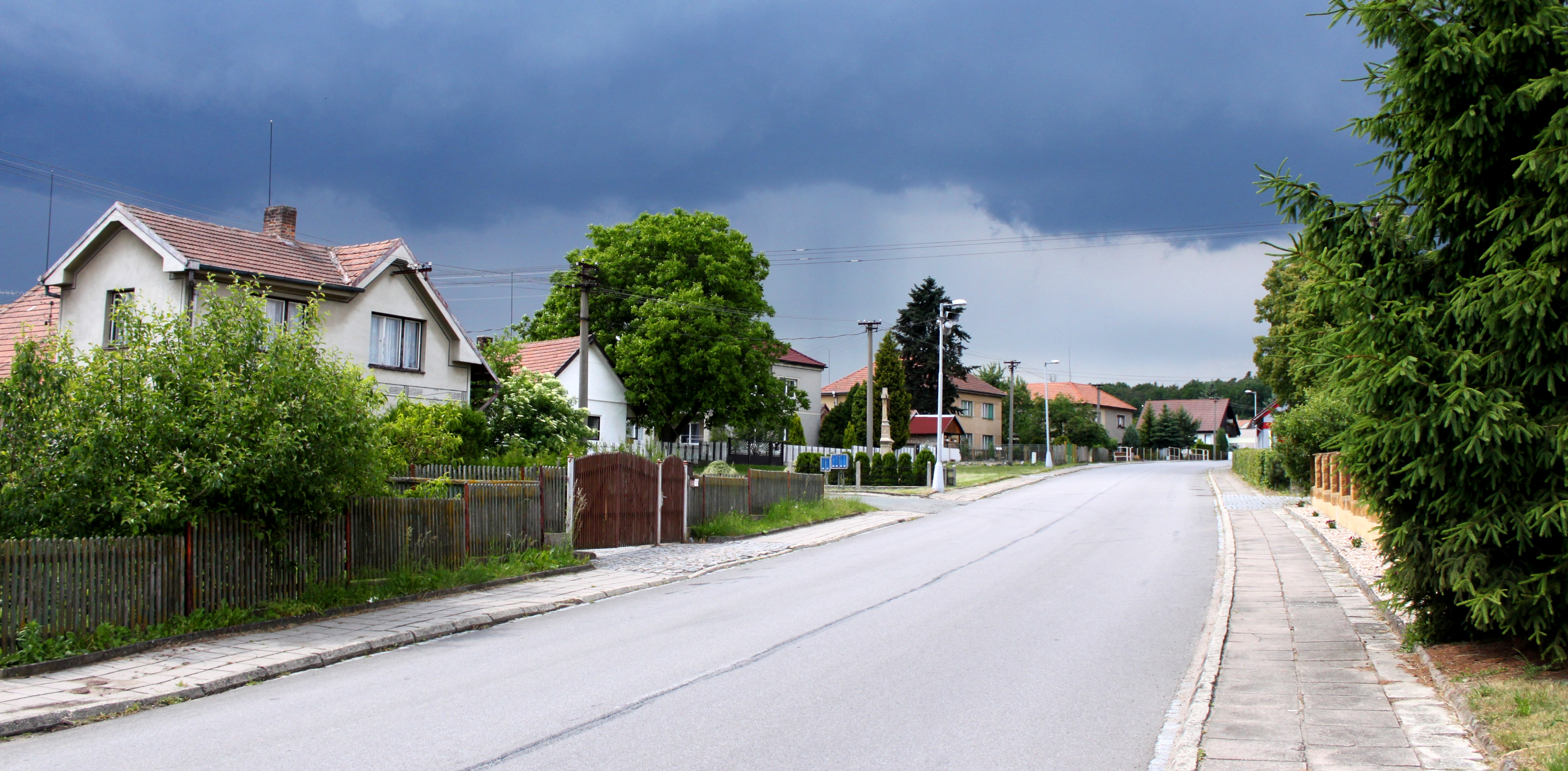
- Main street

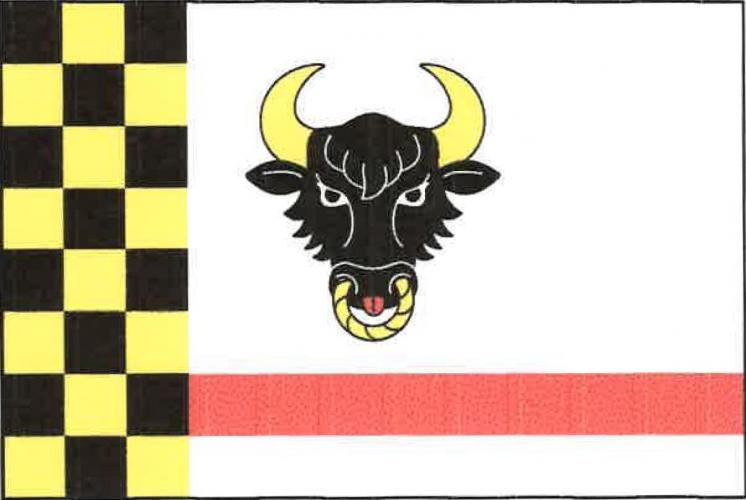
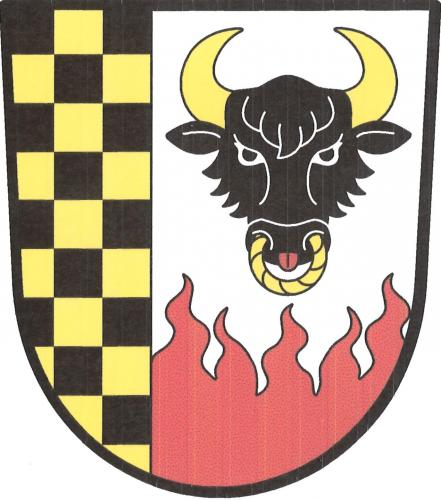
- Flag Coat of arms

- Location in the Czech Republic
- Coordinates: 50°6′21″N 15°33′26″E
- Country: Czech Republic
- Region: Pardubice
- District: Pardubice
- First mentioned: 1436

Area
  - Total: 2.74 km^{2} (1.06 sq mi)
- Elevation: 235 m (771 ft)

Population (2026-01-01)
  - Total: 114
  - Density: 41.6/km^{2} (108/sq mi)
- Time zone: UTC+1 (CET)
  - Summer (DST): UTC+2 (CEST)
- Postal code: 533 16
- Website: www.zaravice.cz

Žáravice is a municipality and village in Pardubice District in the Pardubice Region of the Czech Republic. It has about 100 inhabitants.

== Demographics ==
Historical population
Year	Pop.	±%
1869	138	—
1880	179	+29.7%
1890	191	+6.7%
1900	140	−26.7%
1910	197	+40.7%
1921	205	+4.1%
1930	207	+1.0%
1950	171	−17.4%
1961	163	−4.7%
1970	149	−8.6%
1980	142	−4.7%
1991	151	+6.3%
2001	150	−0.7%
2011	134	−10.7%
2021	120	−10.4%
Source: Censuses
