= Malé Výkleky =

- Municipality
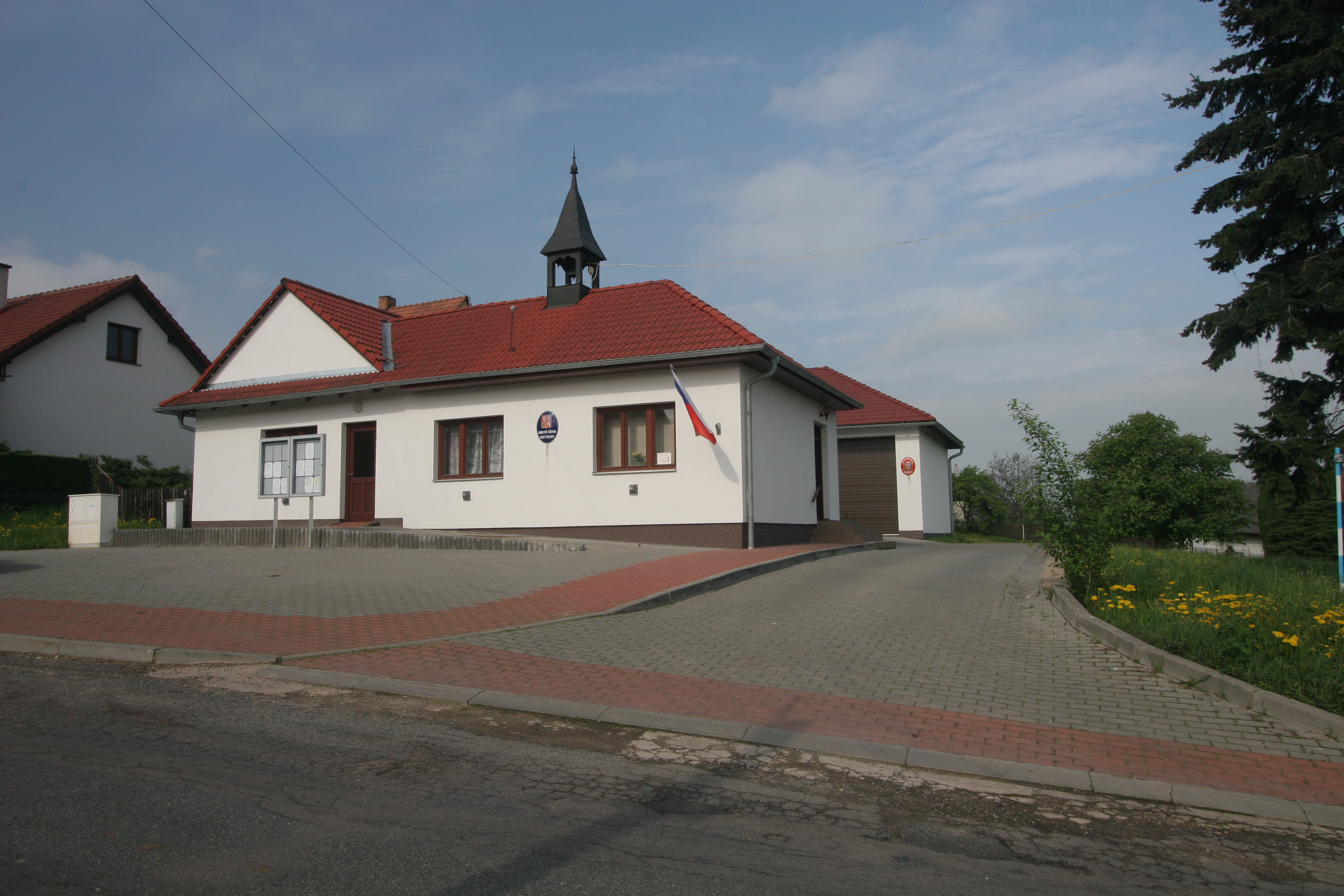
- Municipal office

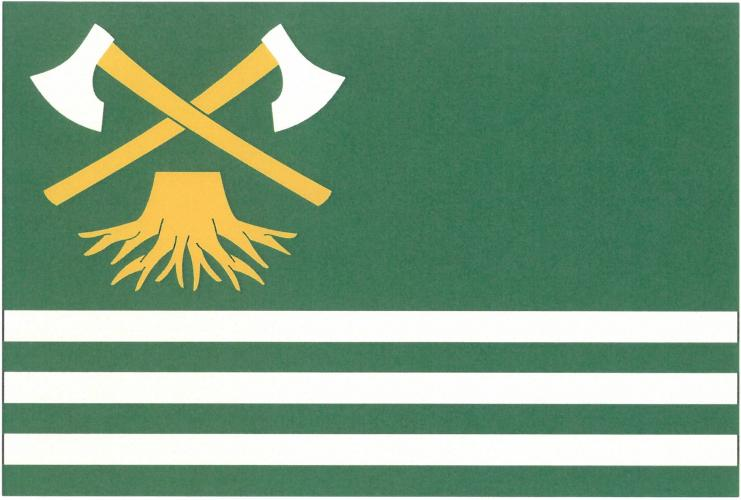
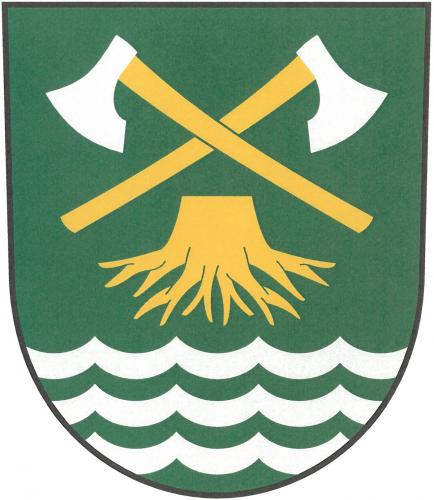
- Flag Coat of arms

- Location in the Czech Republic
- Coordinates: 50°7′10″N 15°32′19″E
- Country: Czech Republic
- Region: Pardubice
- District: Pardubice
- First mentioned: 1654

Area
  - Total: 2.14 km^{2} (0.83 sq mi)
- Elevation: 252 m (827 ft)

Population (2026-01-01)
  - Total: 138
  - Density: 64.5/km^{2} (167/sq mi)
- Time zone: UTC+1 (CET)
  - Summer (DST): UTC+2 (CEST)
- Postal code: 533 16
- Website: www.malevykleky.cz

Malé Výkleky is a municipality and village in Pardubice District in the Pardubice Region of the Czech Republic. It has about 100 inhabitants.

== Demographics ==
Historical population
Year	Pop.	±%
1869	180	—
1880	206	+14.4%
1890	214	+3.9%
1900	238	+11.2%
1910	236	−0.8%
1921	207	−12.3%
1930	198	−4.3%
1950	159	−19.7%
1961	182	+14.5%
1970	171	−6.0%
1980	157	−8.2%
1991	130	−17.2%
2001	138	+6.2%
2011	119	−13.8%
2021	124	+4.2%
Source: Censuses
