= Podůlšany =

- Municipality
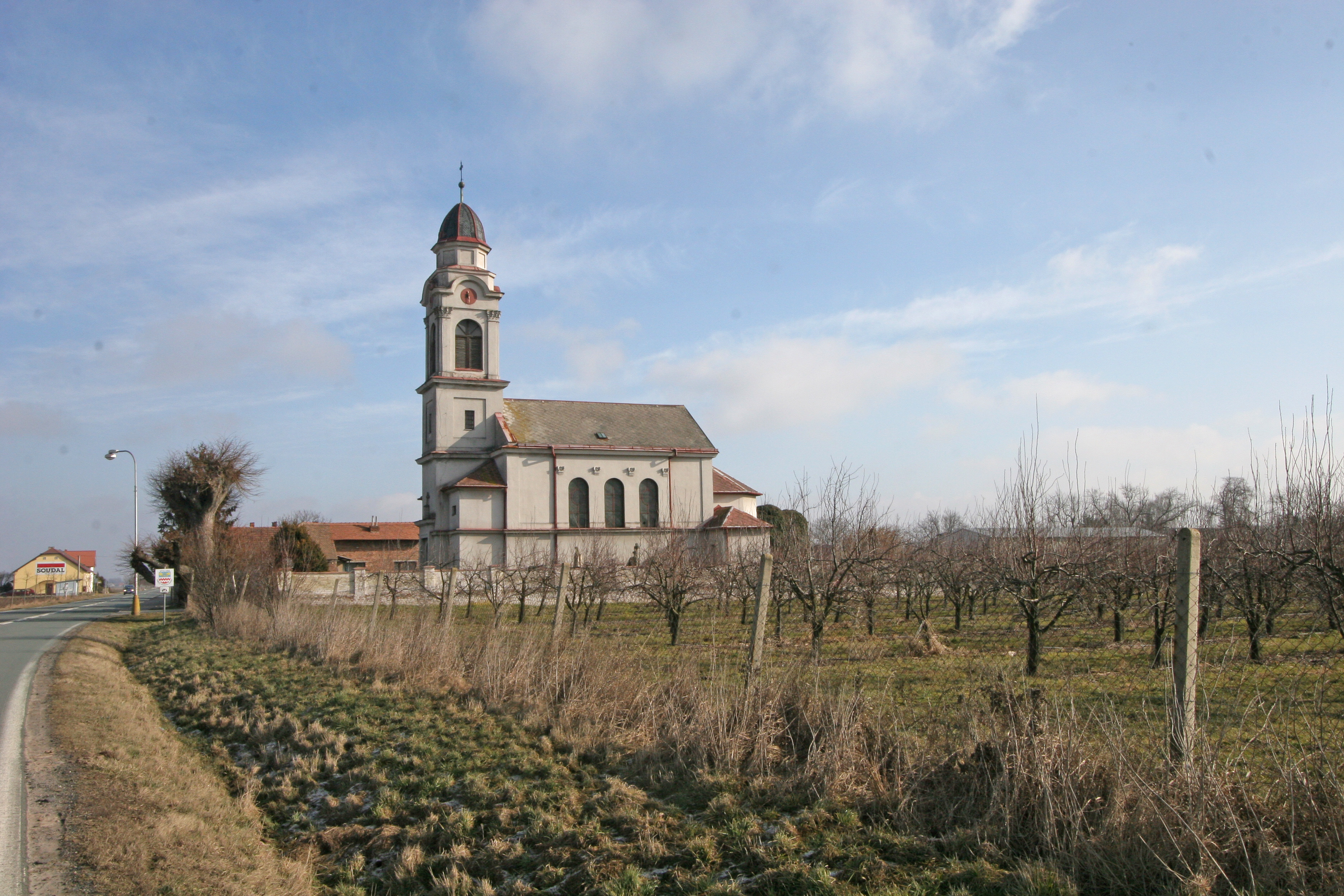
- Church of Saint Nicholas

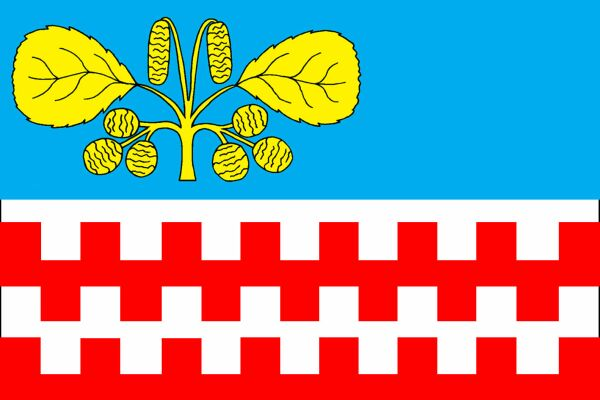
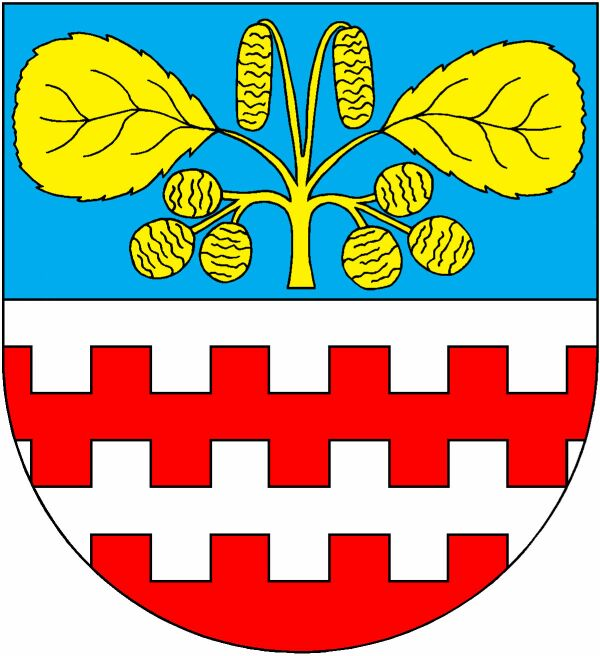
- Flag Coat of arms

- Location in the Czech Republic
- Coordinates: 50°7′44″N 15°44′18″E
- Country: Czech Republic
- Region: Pardubice
- District: Pardubice
- First mentioned: 1142

Area
  - Total: 3.34 km^{2} (1.29 sq mi)
- Elevation: 227 m (745 ft)

Population (2026-01-01)
  - Total: 149
  - Density: 44.6/km^{2} (116/sq mi)
- Time zone: UTC+1 (CET)
  - Summer (DST): UTC+2 (CEST)
- Postal code: 533 45
- Website: www.podulsany.cz

Podůlšany is a municipality and village in Pardubice District in the Pardubice Region of the Czech Republic. It has about 100 inhabitants.

== Demographics ==
Historical population
Year	Pop.	±%
1869	288	—
1880	278	−3.5%
1890	312	+12.2%
1900	292	−6.4%
1910	260	−11.0%
1921	249	−4.2%
1930	299	+20.1%
1950	226	−24.4%
1961	227	+0.4%
1970	189	−16.7%
1980	165	−12.7%
1991	157	−4.8%
2001	151	−3.8%
2011	158	+4.6%
2021	159	+0.6%
Source: Censuses
