= Lipoltice =

- Municipality
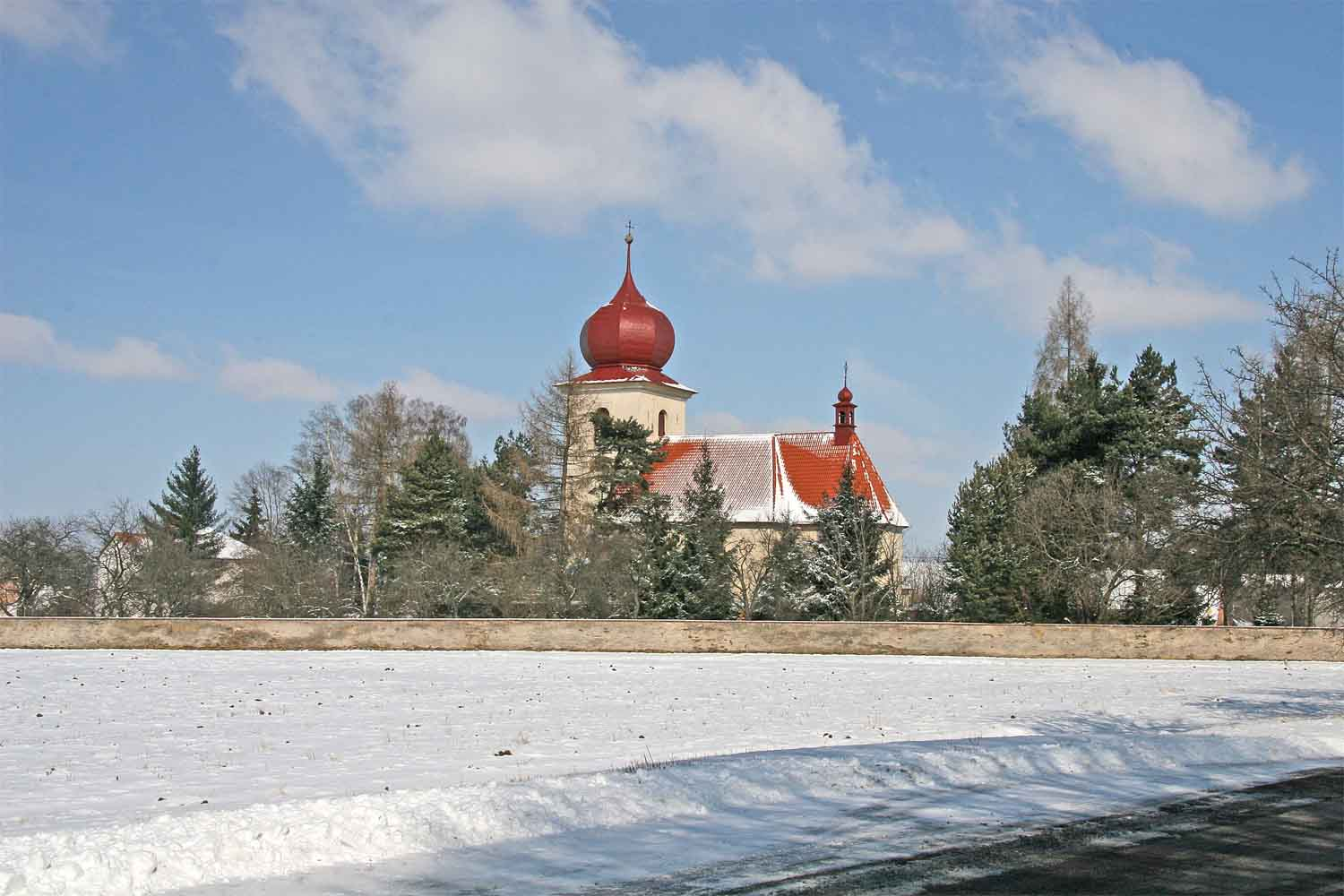
- Church of Saint Matthew

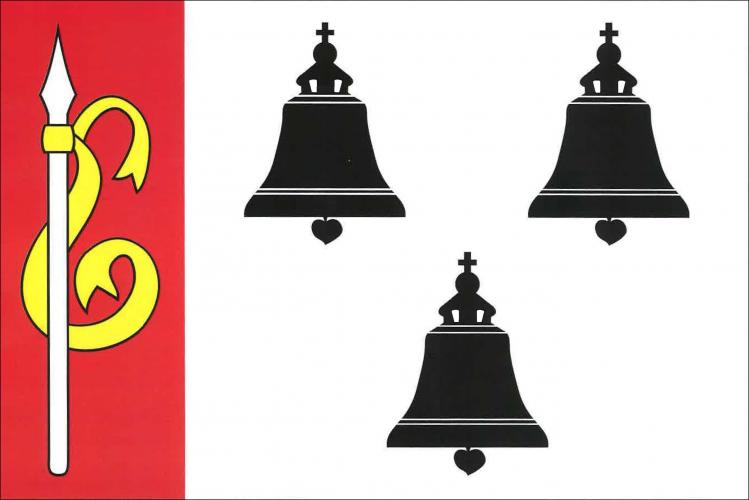
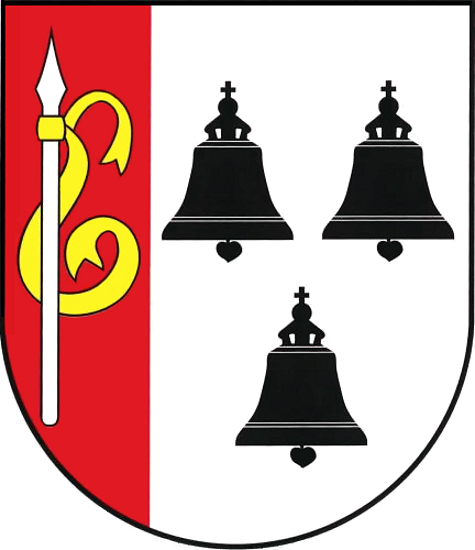
- Flag Coat of arms

- Location in the Czech Republic
- Coordinates: 49°59′16″N 15°34′8″E
- Country: Czech Republic
- Region: Pardubice
- District: Pardubice
- First mentioned: 1257

Area
  - Total: 5.26 km^{2} (2.03 sq mi)
- Elevation: 280 m (920 ft)

Population (2026-01-01)
  - Total: 437
  - Density: 83.1/km^{2} (215/sq mi)
- Time zone: UTC+1 (CET)
  - Summer (DST): UTC+2 (CEST)
- Postal code: 533 64
- Website: lipoltice.cz

Lipoltice is a municipality and village in Pardubice District in the Pardubice Region of the Czech Republic. It has about 400 inhabitants.

== Administrative division ==
Lipoltice consists of three municipal parts (in brackets population according to the 2021 census):

- Lipoltice (344)
- Pelechov (54)
- Sovoluská Lhota (19)

== Demographics ==
Historical population
| Year | Pop. | ±% |
|---|---|---|
| 1869 | 578 | — |
| 1880 | 561 | −2.9% |
| 1890 | 602 | +7.3% |
| 1900 | 585 | −2.8% |
| 1910 | 615 | +5.1% |
| 1921 | 588 | −4.4% |
| 1930 | 524 | −10.9% |
| 1950 | 433 | −17.4% |
| 1961 | 438 | +1.2% |
| 1970 | 396 | −9.6% |
| 1980 | 422 | +6.6% |
| 1991 | 363 | −14.0% |
| 2001 | 342 | −5.8% |
| 2011 | 402 | +17.5% |
| 2021 | 417 | +3.7% |
Source: Censuses
