= Labské Chrčice =

- Municipality
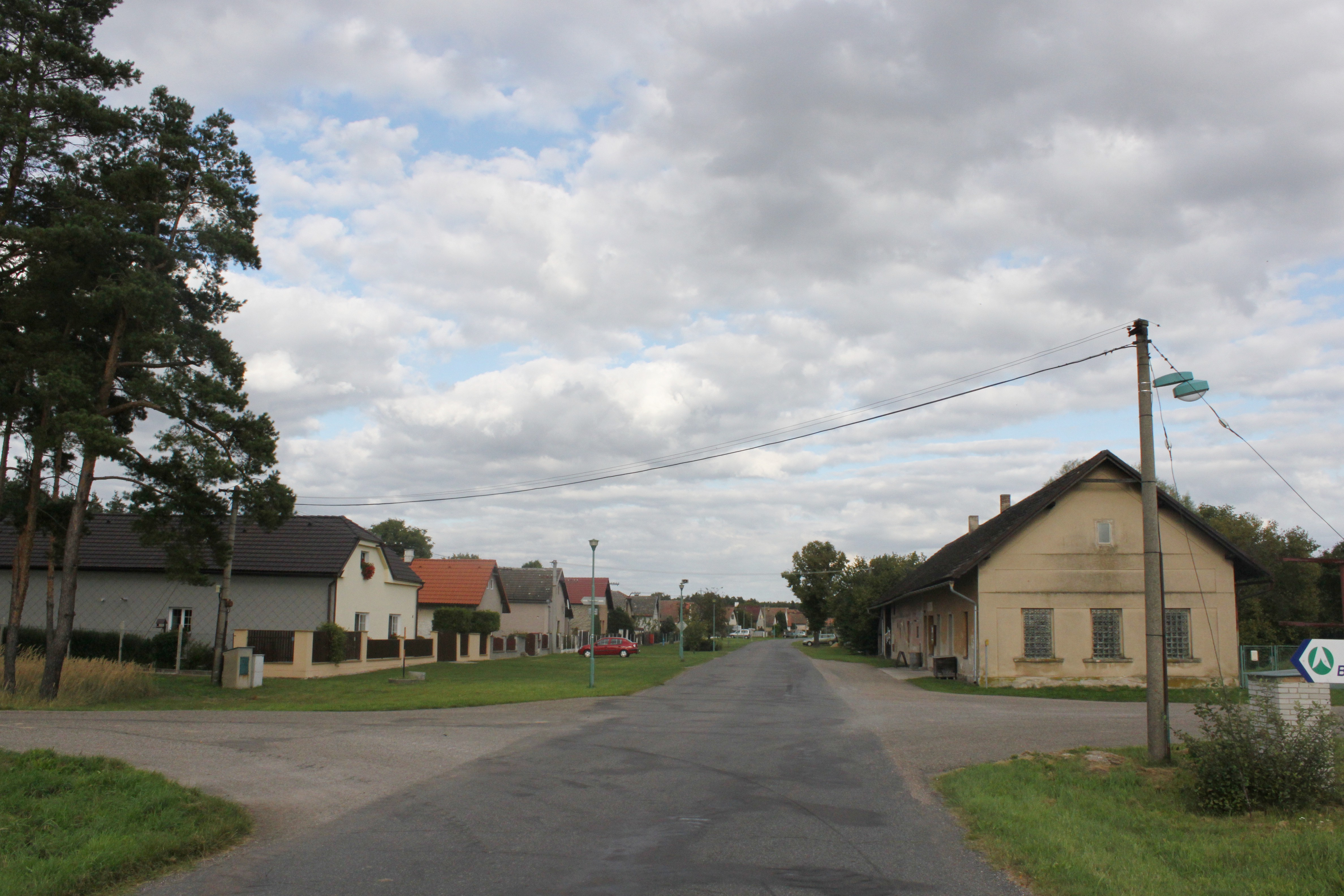
- Western part of Labské Chrčice

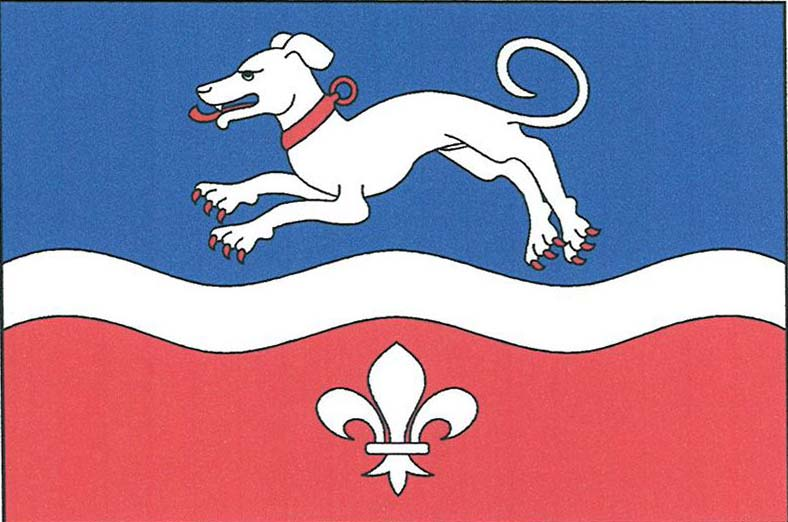
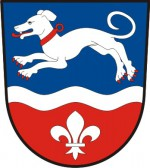
- Flag Coat of arms

- Location in the Czech Republic
- Coordinates: 50°3′5″N 15°24′37″E
- Country: Czech Republic
- Region: Pardubice
- District: Pardubice
- First mentioned: 1436

Area
  - Total: 4.48 km^{2} (1.73 sq mi)
- Elevation: 203 m (666 ft)

Population (2026-01-01)
  - Total: 320
  - Density: 71/km^{2} (180/sq mi)
- Time zone: UTC+1 (CET)
  - Summer (DST): UTC+2 (CEST)
- Postal code: 281 26
- Website: www.labskechrcice.eu

Labské Chrčice is a municipality and village in Pardubice District in the Pardubice Region of the Czech Republic. It has about 300 inhabitants.

== Demographics ==
Historical population
Year	Pop.	±%
1869	222	—
1880	304	+36.9%
1890	308	+1.3%
1900	365	+18.5%
1910	345	−5.5%
1921	322	−6.7%
1930	319	−0.9%
1950	249	−21.9%
1961	248	−0.4%
1970	218	−12.1%
1980	204	−6.4%
1991	181	−11.3%
2001	145	−19.9%
2011	173	+19.3%
2021	237	+37.0%
Source: Censuses
