= Kojice =

- Municipality
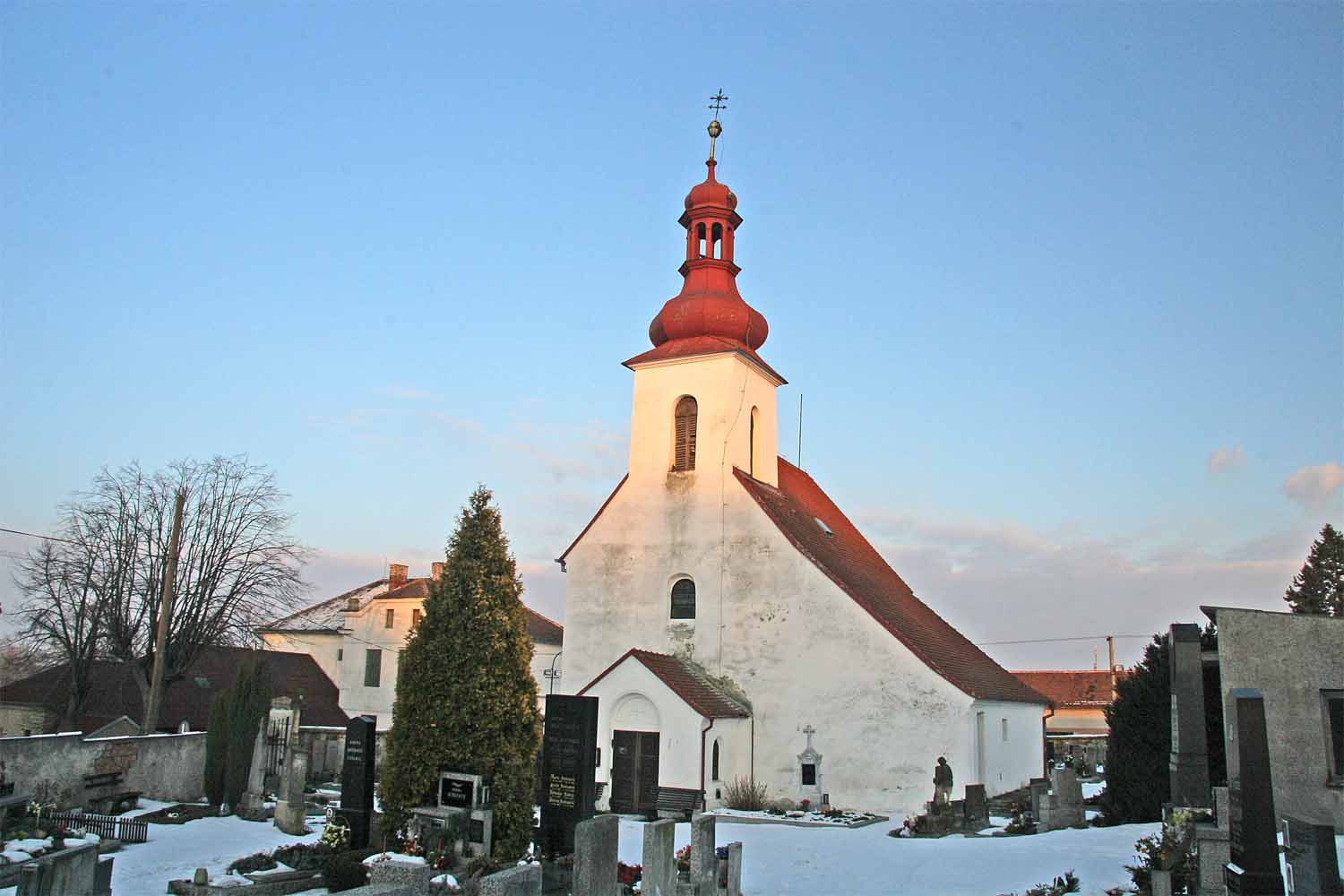
- Church of Saints Peter and Paul

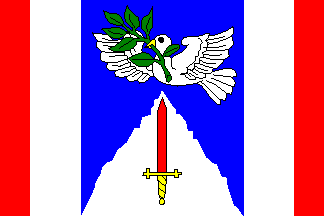
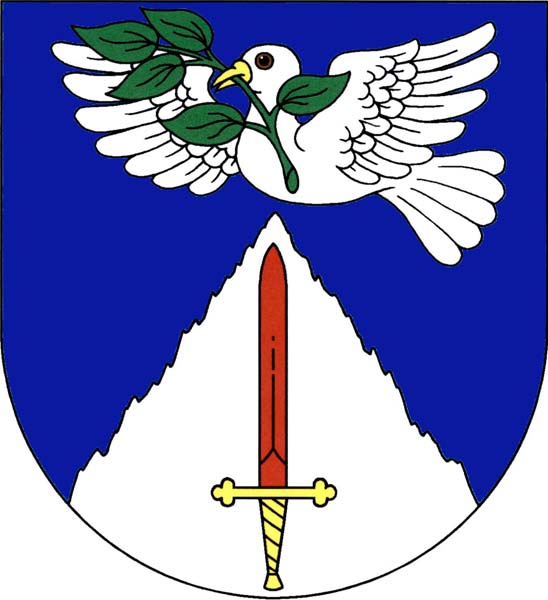
- Flag Coat of arms

- Location in the Czech Republic
- Coordinates: 50°2′35″N 15°23′12″E
- Country: Czech Republic
- Region: Pardubice
- District: Pardubice
- First mentioned: 1238

Area
  - Total: 6.12 km^{2} (2.36 sq mi)
- Elevation: 220 m (720 ft)

Population (2026-01-01)
  - Total: 442
  - Density: 72.2/km^{2} (187/sq mi)
- Time zone: UTC+1 (CET)
  - Summer (DST): UTC+2 (CEST)
- Postal code: 533 12
- Website: www.kojice.cz

Kojice is a municipality and village in Pardubice District in the Pardubice Region of the Czech Republic. It has about 400 inhabitants.

== Demographics ==
Historical population
Year	Pop.	±%
1869	499	—
1880	539	+8.0%
1890	544	+0.9%
1900	525	−3.5%
1910	558	+6.3%
1921	581	+4.1%
1930	568	−2.2%
1950	582	+2.5%
1961	460	−21.0%
1970	439	−4.6%
1980	480	+9.3%
1991	446	−7.1%
2001	428	−4.0%
2011	447	+4.4%
2021	430	−3.8%
Source: Censuses
