= Chýšť =

- Municipality
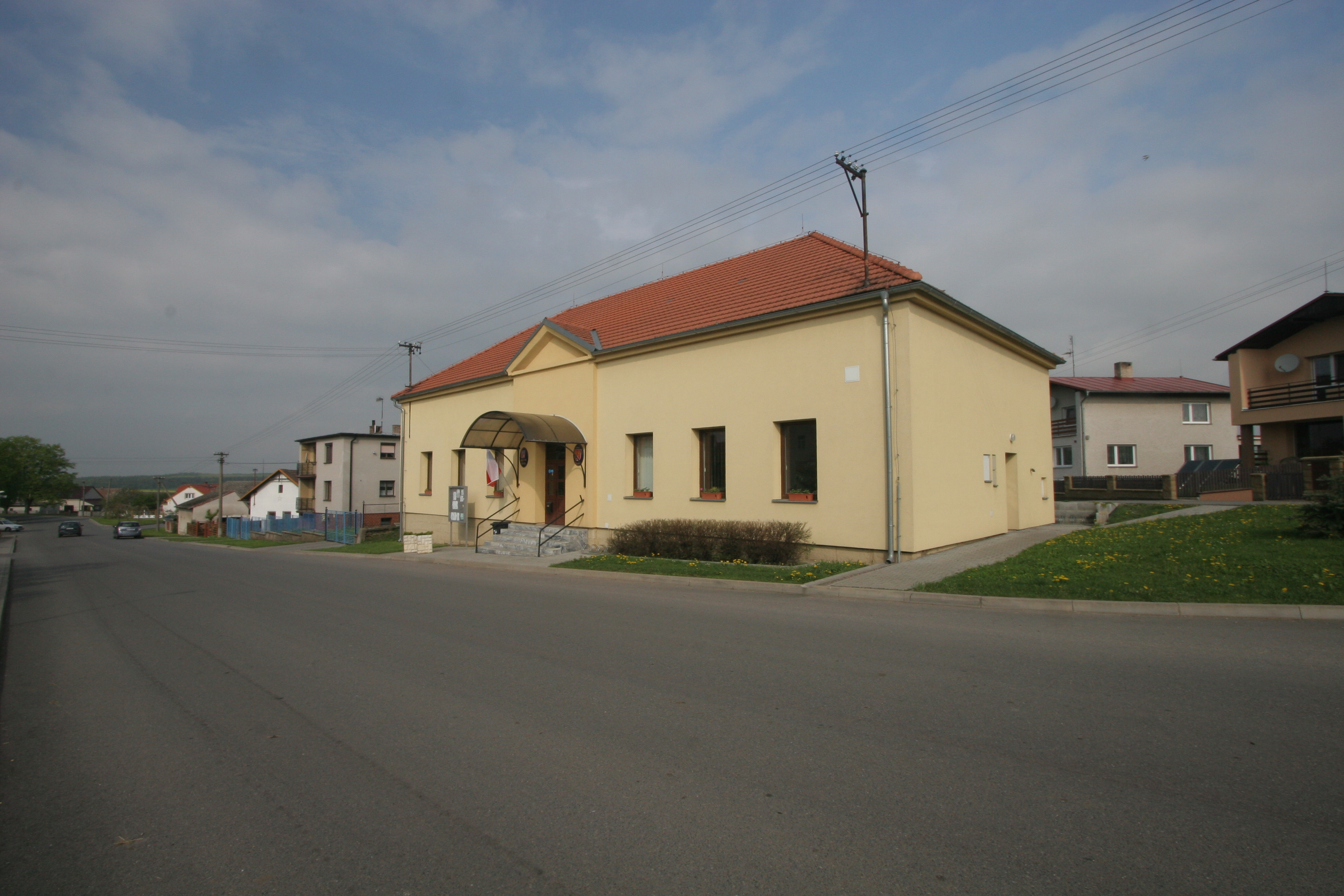
- Municipal office

- Flag Coat of arms

- Location in the Czech Republic
- Coordinates: 50°7′42″N 15°32′29″E
- Country: Czech Republic
- Region: Pardubice
- District: Pardubice
- First mentioned: 1368

Area
  - Total: 7.89 km^{2} (3.05 sq mi)
- Elevation: 256 m (840 ft)

Population (2026-01-01)
  - Total: 202
  - Density: 25.6/km^{2} (66.3/sq mi)
- Time zone: UTC+1 (CET)
  - Summer (DST): UTC+2 (CEST)
- Postal code: 533 16
- Website: www.chyst.cz

Chýšť is a municipality and village in Pardubice District in the Pardubice Region of the Czech Republic. It has about 200 inhabitants.

== Demographics ==
Historical population
Year	Pop.	±%
1869	341	—
1880	343	+0.6%
1890	364	+6.1%
1900	344	−5.5%
1910	339	−1.5%
1921	318	−6.2%
1930	317	−0.3%
1950	250	−21.1%
1961	192	−23.2%
1970	176	−8.3%
1980	182	+3.4%
1991	206	+13.2%
2001	200	−2.9%
2011	198	−1.0%
2021	207	+4.5%
Source: Censuses
