= Jankovice (Pardubice District) =

- Municipality
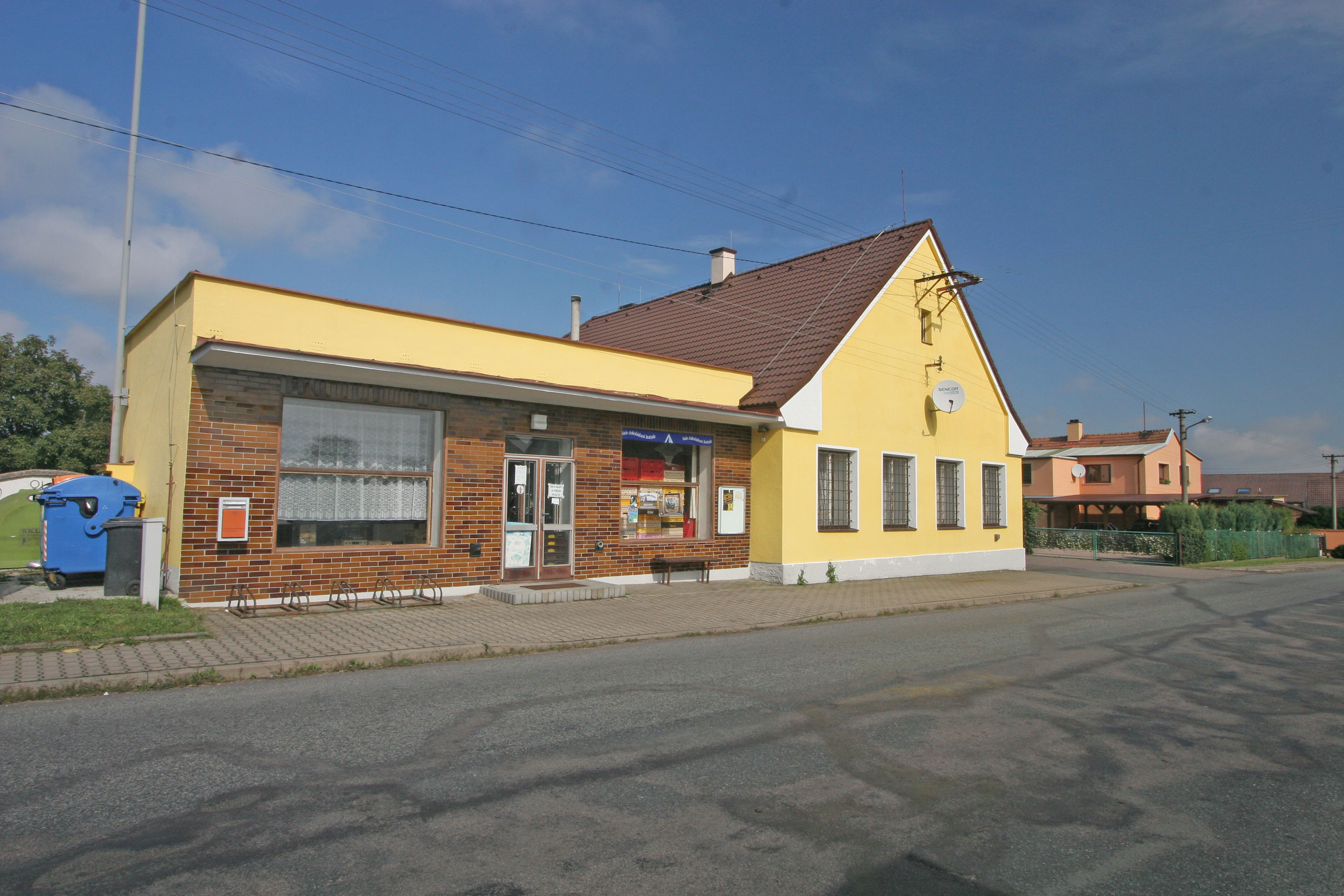
- Municipal office

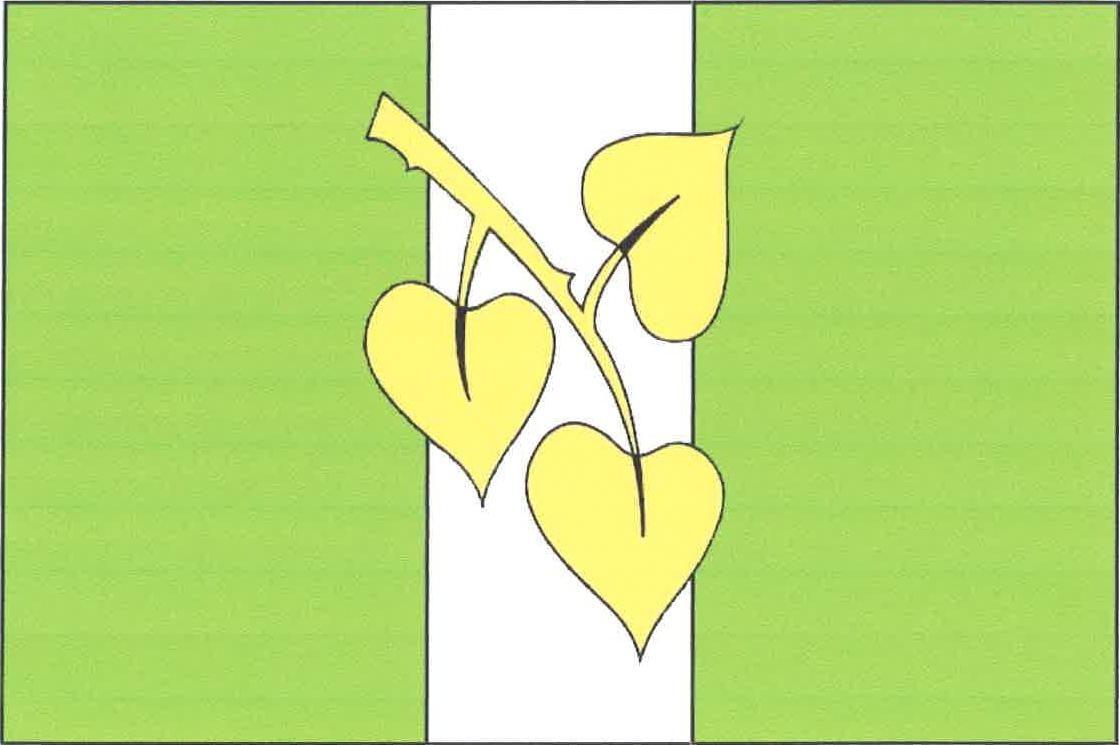
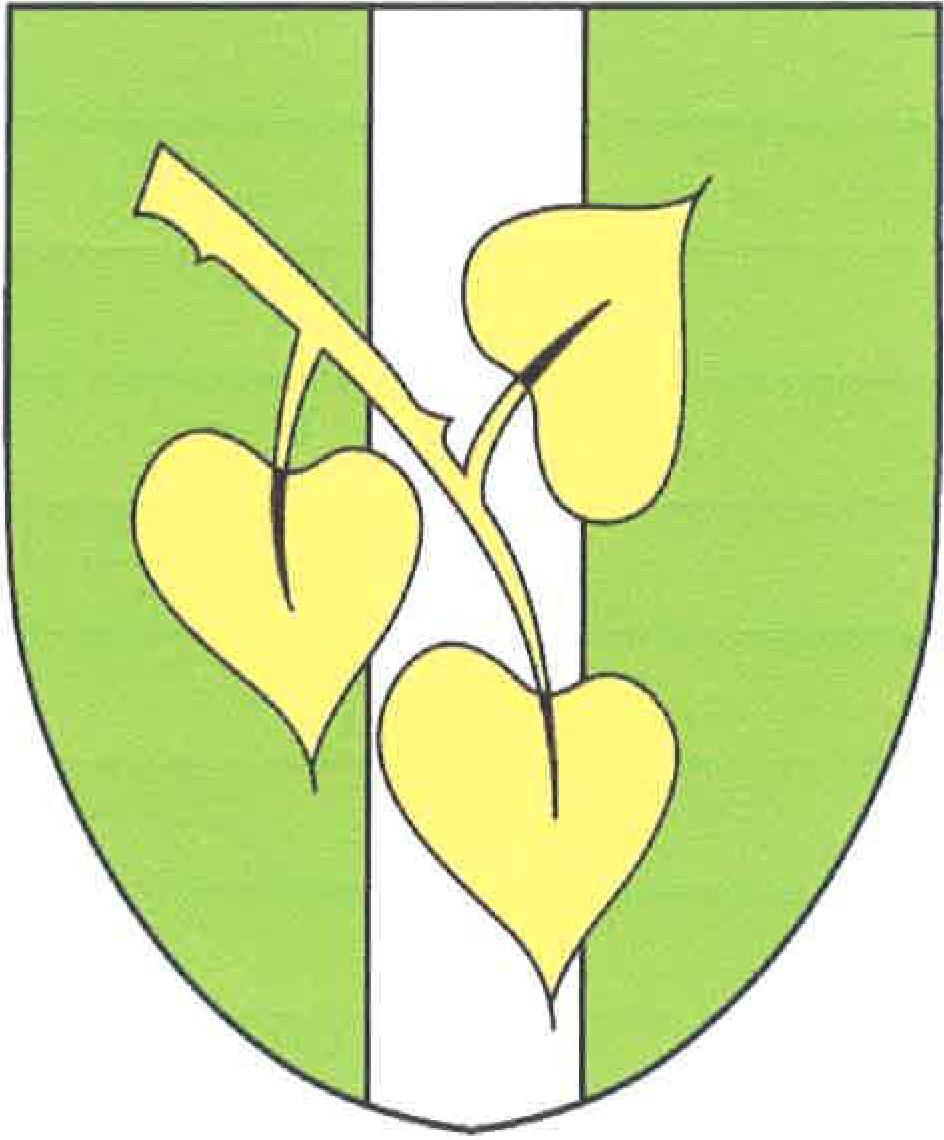
- Flag Coat of arms

- Location in the Czech Republic
- Coordinates: 50°0′28″N 15°31′45″E
- Country: Czech Republic
- Region: Pardubice
- District: Pardubice
- First mentioned: 1437

Area
  - Total: 8.01 km^{2} (3.09 sq mi)
- Elevation: 234 m (768 ft)

Population (2026-01-01)
  - Total: 362
  - Density: 45.2/km^{2} (117/sq mi)
- Time zone: UTC+1 (CET)
  - Summer (DST): UTC+2 (CEST)
- Postal code: 535 01
- Website: www.obec-jankovice.cz

Jankovice is a municipality and village in Pardubice District in the Pardubice Region of the Czech Republic. It has about 400 inhabitants.

== Administrative division ==
Jankovice consists of three municipal parts (in brackets population according to the 2021 census):

- Jankovice (150)
- Kozašice (94)
- Seník (79)

== Demographics ==
Historical population
Year	Pop.	±%
1869	497	—
1880	596	+19.9%
1890	566	−5.0%
1900	592	+4.6%
1910	623	+5.2%
1921	607	−2.6%
1930	544	−10.4%
1950	483	−11.2%
1961	492	+1.9%
1970	400	−18.7%
1980	367	−8.3%
1991	268	−27.0%
2001	282	+5.2%
2011	301	+6.7%
2021	323	+7.3%
Source: Censuses
