= Kasalice =

- Municipality
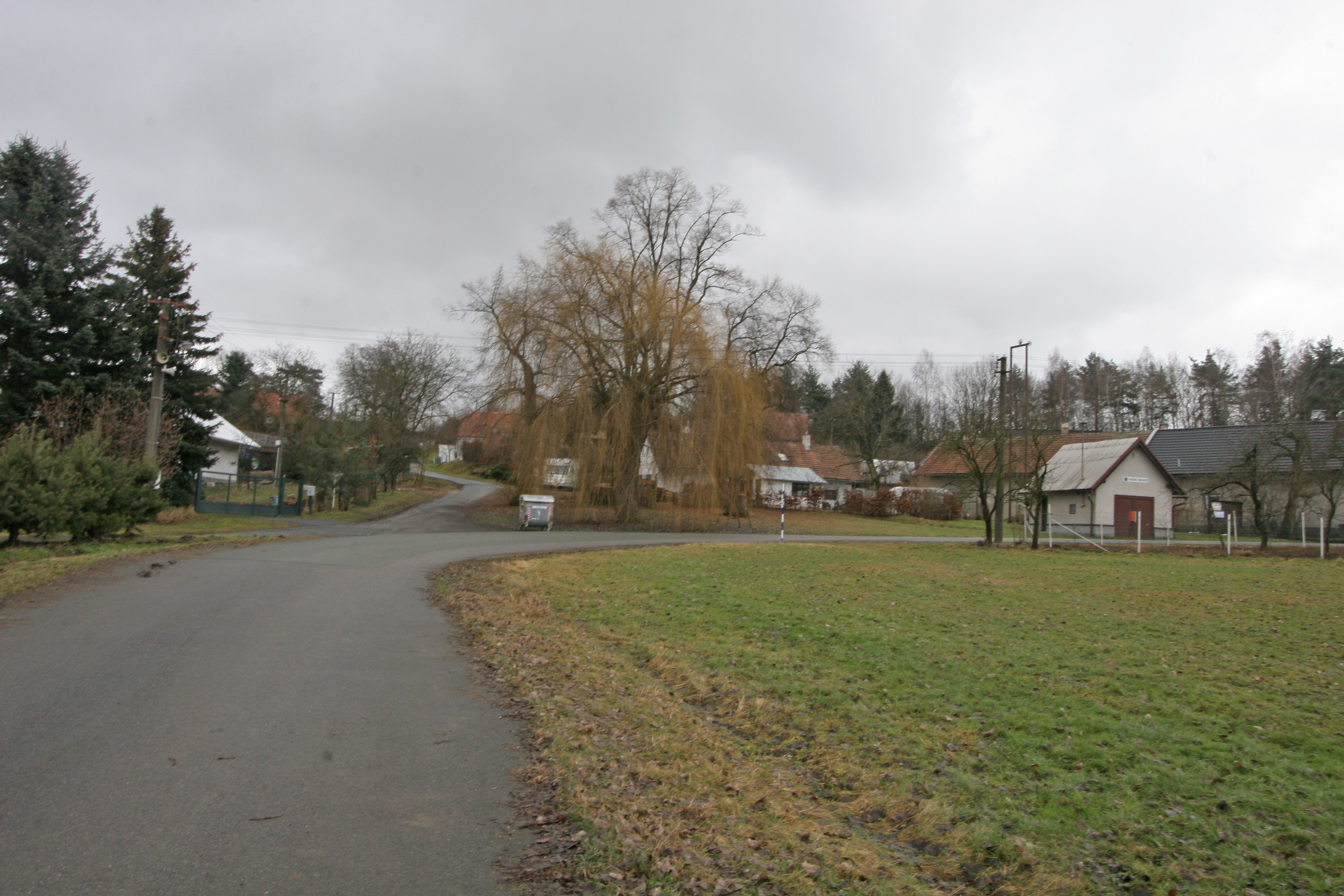
- Kasaličky, a part of Kasalice

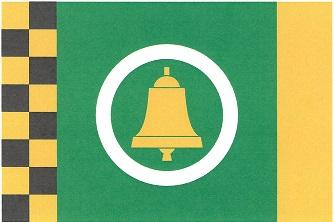
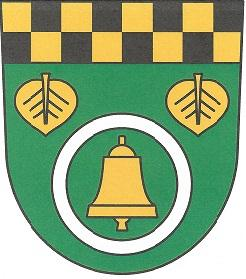
- Flag Coat of arms

- Location in the Czech Republic
- Coordinates: 50°7′5″N 15°36′35″E
- Country: Czech Republic
- Region: Pardubice
- District: Pardubice
- First mentioned: 1372

Area
  - Total: 4.58 km^{2} (1.77 sq mi)
- Elevation: 262 m (860 ft)

Population (2026-01-01)
  - Total: 219
  - Density: 47.8/km^{2} (124/sq mi)
- Time zone: UTC+1 (CET)
  - Summer (DST): UTC+2 (CEST)
- Postal code: 533 41
- Website: www.kasalice.eu

Kasalice is a municipality and village in Pardubice District in the Pardubice Region of the Czech Republic. It has about 200 inhabitants.

== Administrative division ==
Kasalice consists of two municipal parts (in brackets population according to the 2021 census):

- Kasalice (125)
- Kasaličky (72)

== Demographics ==
Historical population
Year	Pop.	±%
1869	330	—
1880	379	+14.8%
1890	360	−5.0%
1900	348	−3.3%
1910	354	+1.7%
1921	332	−6.2%
1930	304	−8.4%
1950	248	−18.4%
1961	246	−0.8%
1970	208	−15.4%
1980	211	+1.4%
1991	189	−10.4%
2001	191	+1.1%
2011	190	−0.5%
2021	197	+3.7%
Source: Censuses
