= Strašov =

- Municipality
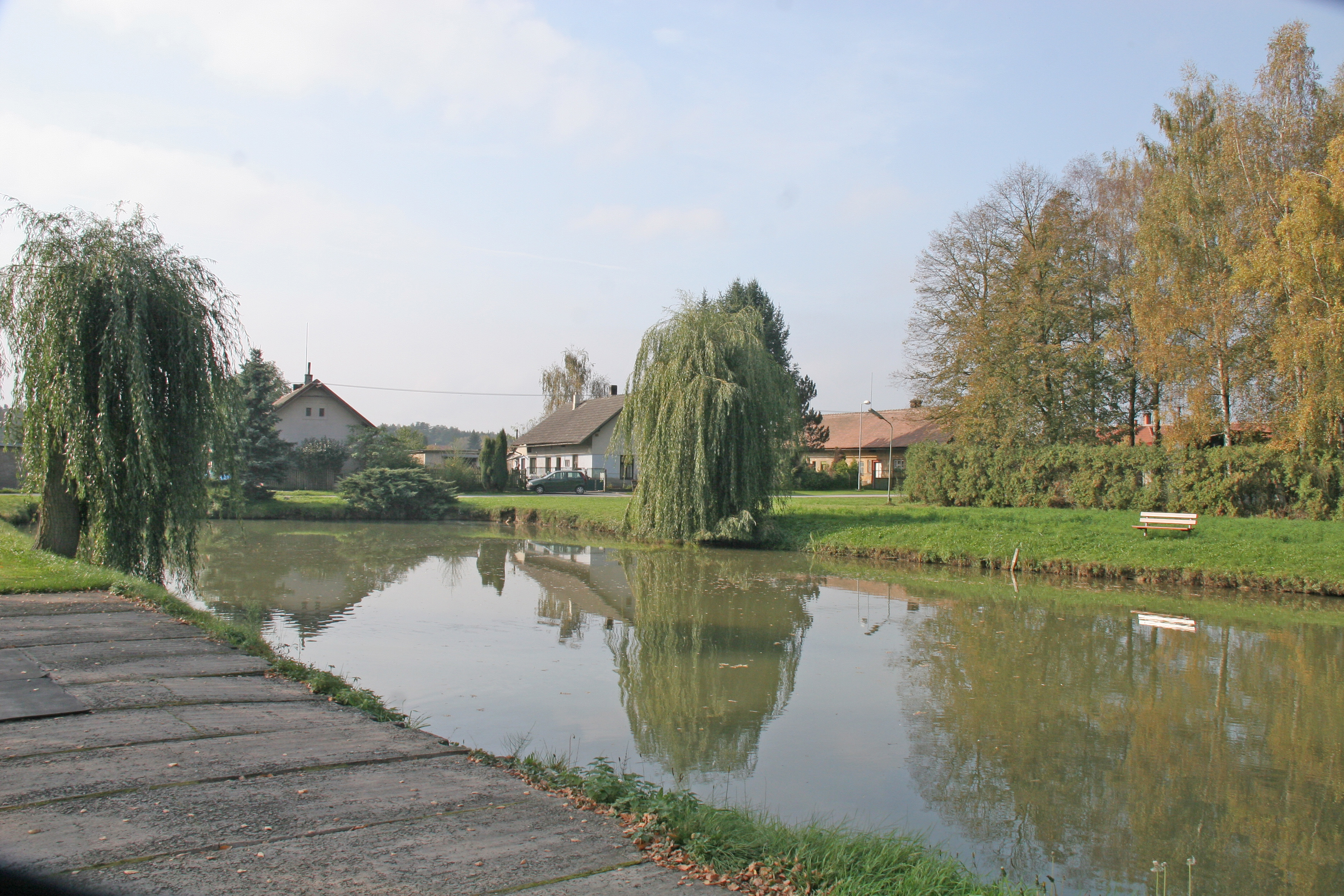
- Centre of Strašov

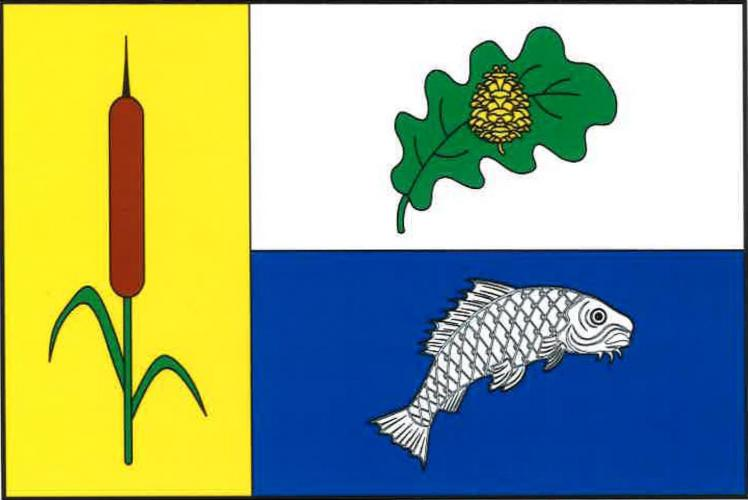
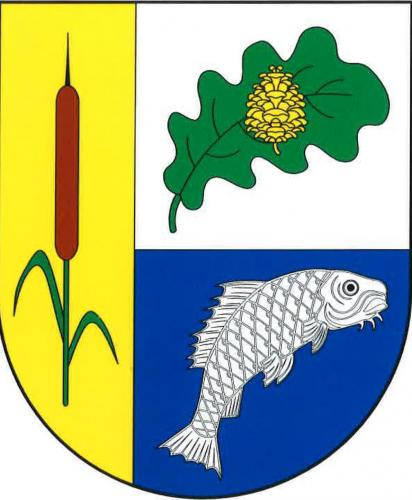
- Flag Coat of arms

- Location in the Czech Republic
- Coordinates: 50°5′15″N 15°31′22″E
- Country: Czech Republic
- Region: Pardubice
- District: Pardubice
- First mentioned: 1337

Area
  - Total: 10.13 km^{2} (3.91 sq mi)
- Elevation: 216 m (709 ft)

Population (2026-01-01)
  - Total: 365
  - Density: 36.0/km^{2} (93.3/sq mi)
- Time zone: UTC+1 (CET)
  - Summer (DST): UTC+2 (CEST)
- Postal code: 533 16
- Website: oustrasov.estranky.cz

Strašov is a municipality and village in Pardubice District in the Pardubice Region of the Czech Republic. It has about 400 inhabitants.

== Demographics ==
Historical population
Year	Pop.	±%
1869	360	—
1880	438	+21.7%
1890	466	+6.4%
1900	462	−0.9%
1910	454	−1.7%
1921	448	−1.3%
1930	388	−13.4%
1950	349	−10.1%
1961	338	−3.2%
1970	335	−0.9%
1980	330	−1.5%
1991	304	−7.9%
2001	290	−4.6%
2011	324	+11.7%
2021	325	+0.3%
Source: Censuses
