= Turkovice =

- Municipality
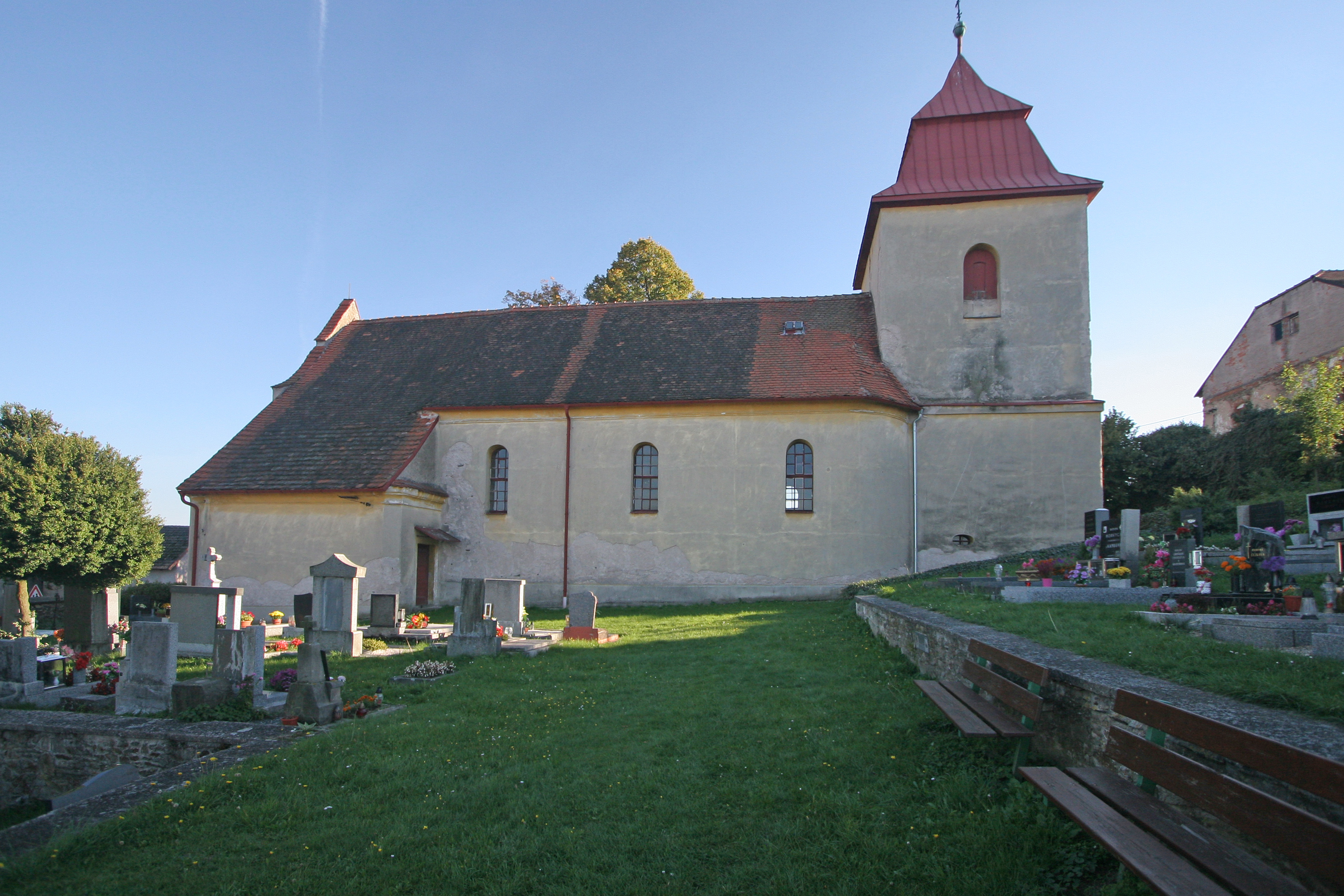
- Church of Saint Martin

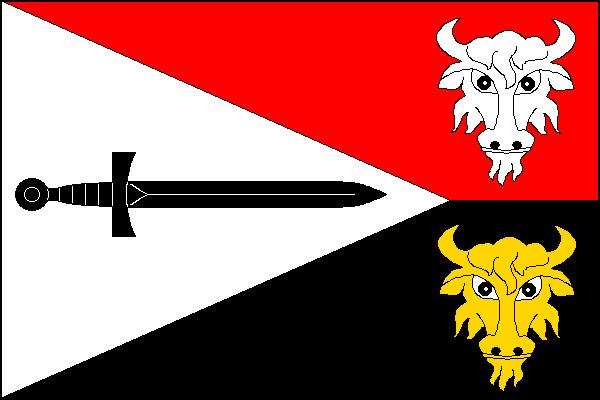
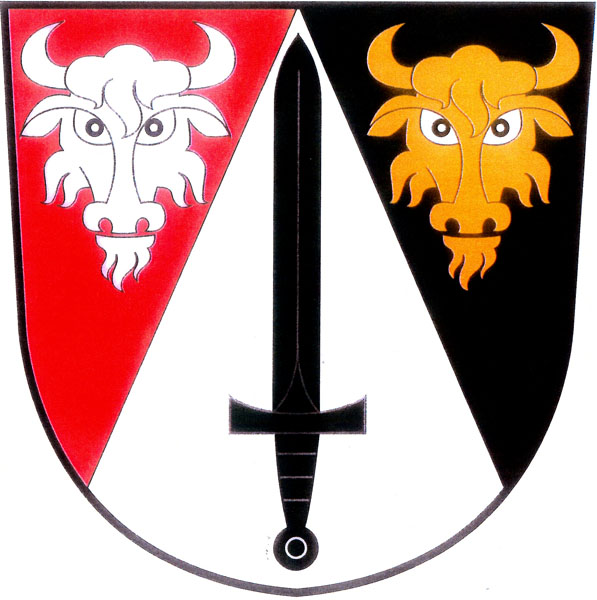
- Flag Coat of arms

- Location in the Czech Republic
- Coordinates: 49°57′9″N 15°32′56″E
- Country: Czech Republic
- Region: Pardubice
- District: Pardubice
- First mentioned: 1257

Area
  - Total: 5.31 km^{2} (2.05 sq mi)
- Elevation: 349 m (1,145 ft)

Population (2026-01-01)
  - Total: 330
  - Density: 62/km^{2} (160/sq mi)
- Time zone: UTC+1 (CET)
  - Summer (DST): UTC+2 (CEST)
- Postal code: 533 63
- Website: www.turkovice.cz

Turkovice is a municipality and village in Pardubice District in the Pardubice Region of the Czech Republic. It has about 300 inhabitants.

== Administrative division ==
Turkovice consists of three municipal parts (in brackets population according to the 2021 census):

- Turkovice (212)
- Bumbalka (47)
- Rašovy (31)

== Demographics ==
Historical population
Year	Pop.	±%
1869	722	—
1880	721	−0.1%
1890	733	+1.7%
1900	639	−12.8%
1910	640	+0.2%
1921	661	+3.3%
1930	545	−17.5%
1950	403	−26.1%
1961	368	−8.7%
1970	310	−15.8%
1980	313	+1.0%
1991	281	−10.2%
2001	274	−2.5%
2011	270	−1.5%
2021	290	+7.4%
Source: Censuses
