= Sovolusky =

- Municipality
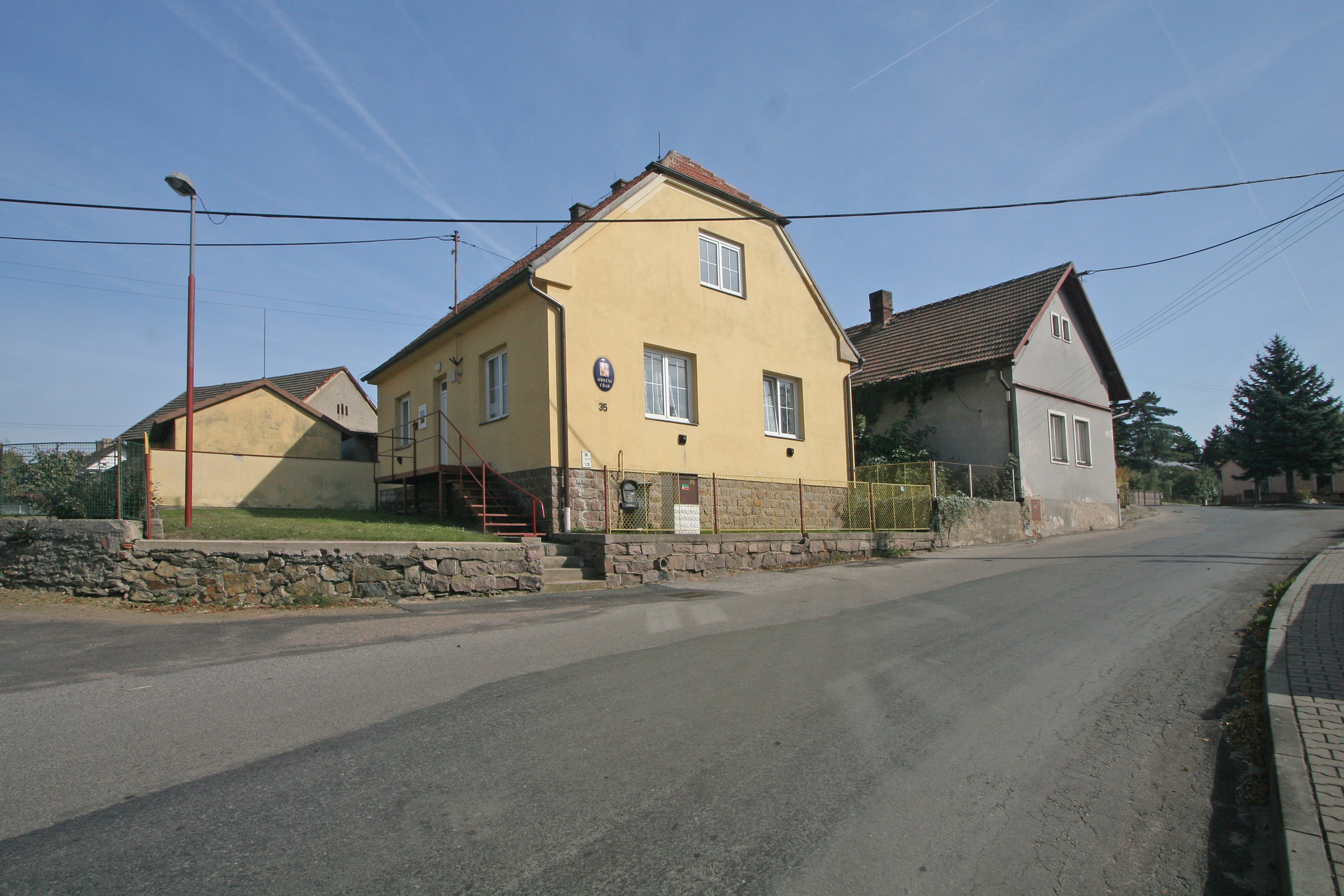
- Municipal office

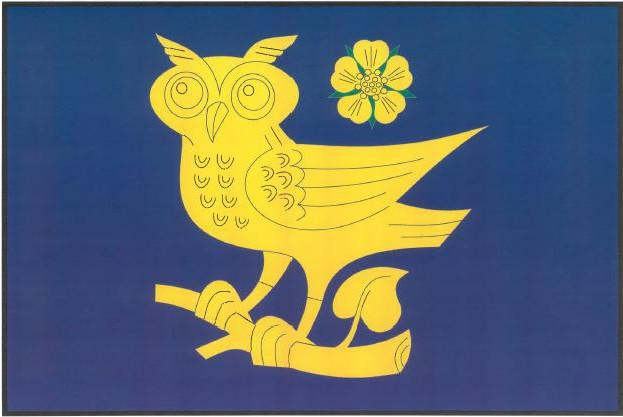
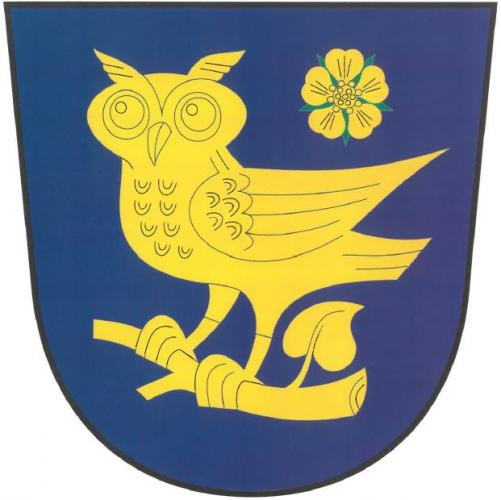
- Flag Coat of arms

- Location in the Czech Republic
- Coordinates: 49°58′9″N 15°32′14″E
- Country: Czech Republic
- Region: Pardubice
- District: Pardubice
- First mentioned: 1360

Area
  - Total: 4.35 km^{2} (1.68 sq mi)
- Elevation: 304 m (997 ft)

Population (2026-01-01)
  - Total: 118
  - Density: 27.1/km^{2} (70.3/sq mi)
- Time zone: UTC+1 (CET)
  - Summer (DST): UTC+2 (CEST)
- Postal code: 535 01
- Website: www.sovolusky.cz

Sovolusky is a municipality and village in Pardubice District in the Pardubice Region of the Czech Republic. It has about 100 inhabitants.

== Demographics ==
Historical population
Year	Pop.	±%
1869	250	—
1880	241	−3.6%
1890	265	+10.0%
1900	243	−8.3%
1910	238	−2.1%
1921	207	−13.0%
1930	173	−16.4%
1950	120	−30.6%
1961	127	+5.8%
1970	109	−14.2%
1980	98	−10.1%
1991	96	−2.0%
2001	124	+29.2%
2011	120	−3.2%
2021	115	−4.2%
Source: Censuses
