= Chrtníky =

- Municipality
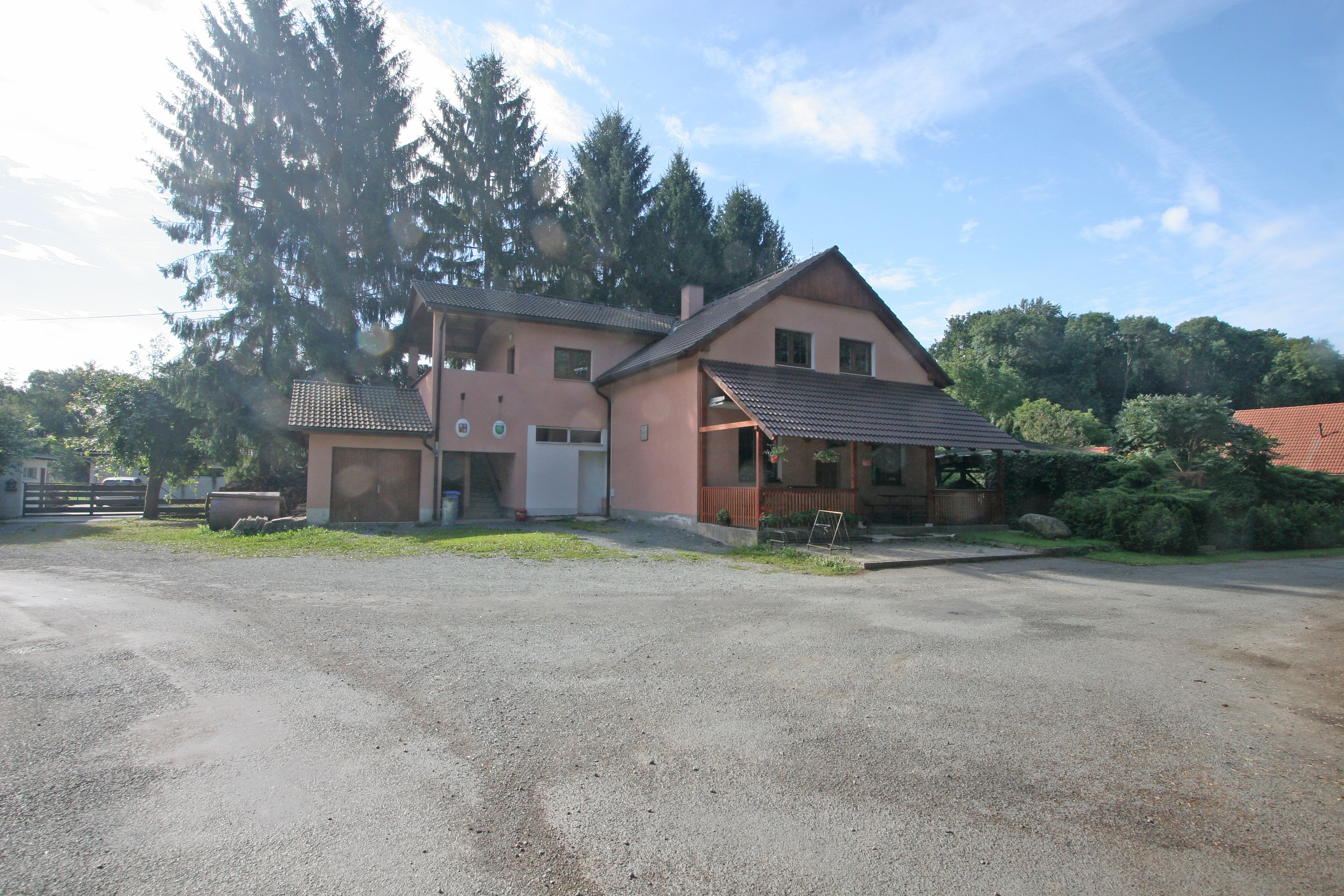
- Municipal office

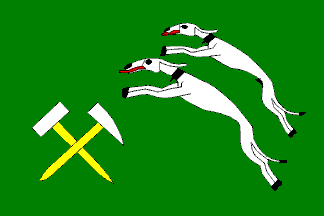
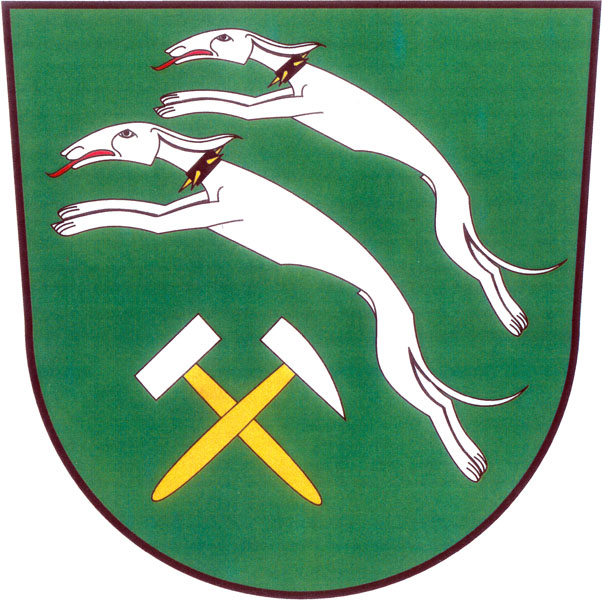
- Flag Coat of arms

- Location in the Czech Republic
- Coordinates: 49°58′55″N 15°36′18″E
- Country: Czech Republic
- Region: Pardubice
- District: Pardubice
- First mentioned: 1397

Area
  - Total: 1.17 km^{2} (0.45 sq mi)
- Elevation: 250 m (820 ft)

Population (2026-01-01)
  - Total: 112
  - Density: 95.7/km^{2} (248/sq mi)
- Time zone: UTC+1 (CET)
  - Summer (DST): UTC+2 (CEST)
- Postal code: 535 01
- Website: www.chrtniky.cz

Chrtníky is a municipality and village in Pardubice District in the Pardubice Region of the Czech Republic. It has about 100 inhabitants.

== Demographics ==
Historical population
Year	Pop.	±%
1869	234	—
1880	229	−2.1%
1890	255	+11.4%
1900	250	−2.0%
1910	240	−4.0%
1921	208	−13.3%
1930	211	+1.4%
1950	193	−8.5%
1961	171	−11.4%
1970	147	−14.0%
1980	111	−24.5%
1991	79	−28.8%
2001	87	+10.1%
2011	89	+2.3%
2021	108	+21.3%
Source: Censuses
