= Litošice =

- Municipality
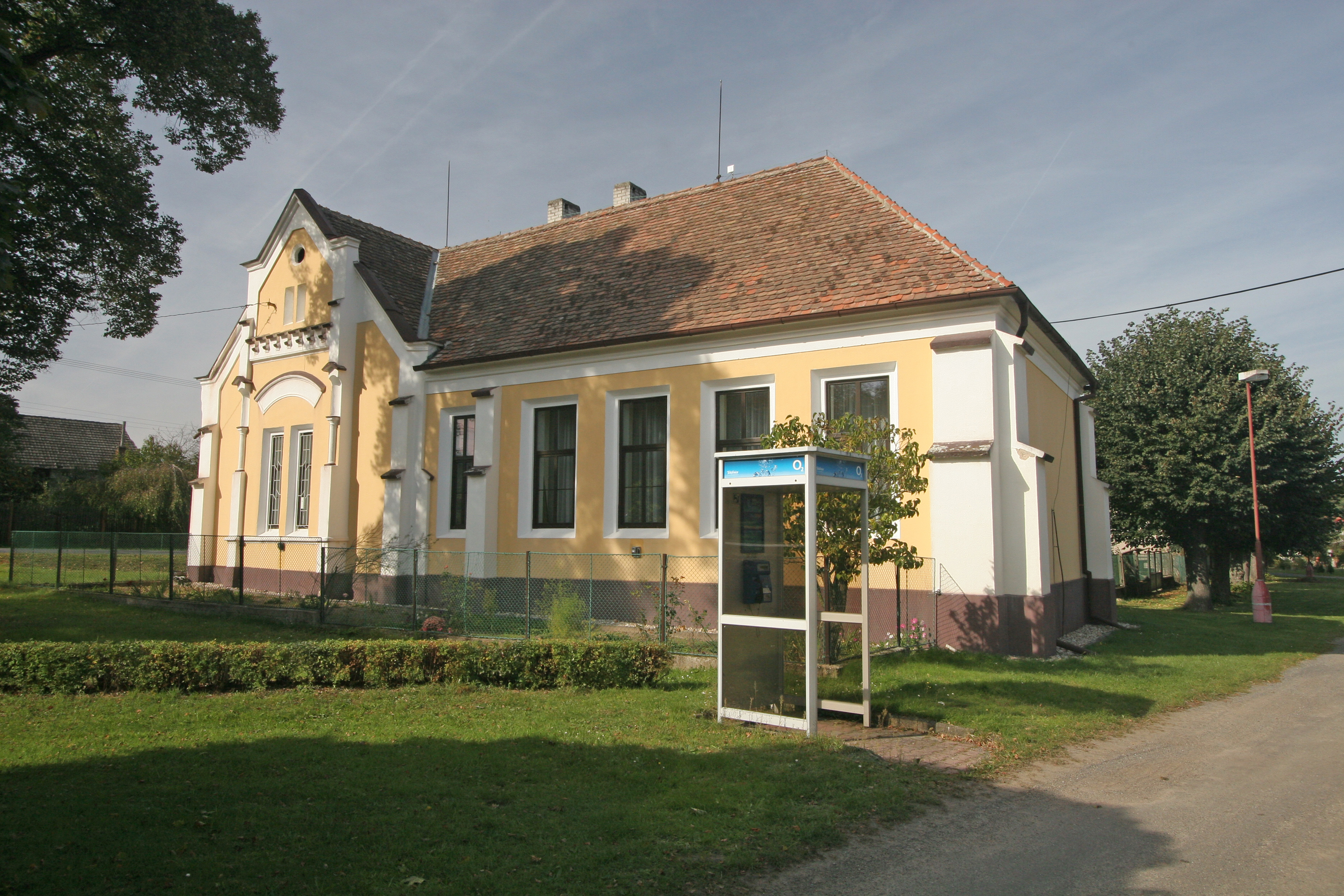
- Municipal office

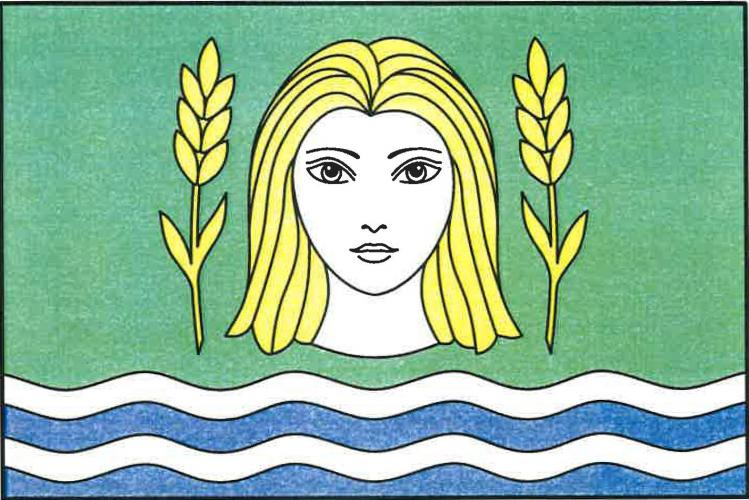
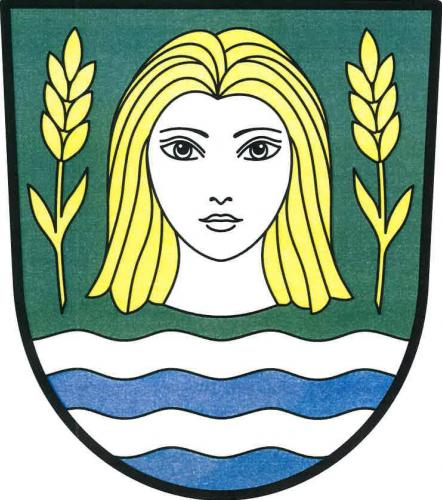
- Flag Coat of arms

- Location in the Czech Republic
- Coordinates: 49°59′6″N 15°30′51″E
- Country: Czech Republic
- Region: Pardubice
- District: Pardubice
- First mentioned: 1167

Area
  - Total: 10.11 km^{2} (3.90 sq mi)
- Elevation: 295 m (968 ft)

Population (2026-01-01)
  - Total: 166
  - Density: 16.4/km^{2} (42.5/sq mi)
- Time zone: UTC+1 (CET)
  - Summer (DST): UTC+2 (CEST)
- Postal code: 535 01
- Website: www.litosice.cz

Litošice is a municipality and village in Pardubice District in the Pardubice Region of the Czech Republic. It has about 200 inhabitants.

== Administrative division ==
Litošice consists of two municipal parts (in brackets population according to the 2021 census):

- Litošice (103)
- Krasnice (58)

== Demographics ==
Historical population
Year	Pop.	±%
1869	350	—
1880	360	+2.9%
1890	357	−0.8%
1900	380	+6.4%
1910	401	+5.5%
1921	385	−4.0%
1930	320	−16.9%
1950	234	−26.9%
1961	206	−12.0%
1970	163	−20.9%
1980	117	−28.2%
1991	101	−13.7%
2001	98	−3.0%
2011	138	+40.8%
2021	161	+16.7%
Source: Censuses
