= Holotín =

- Municipality
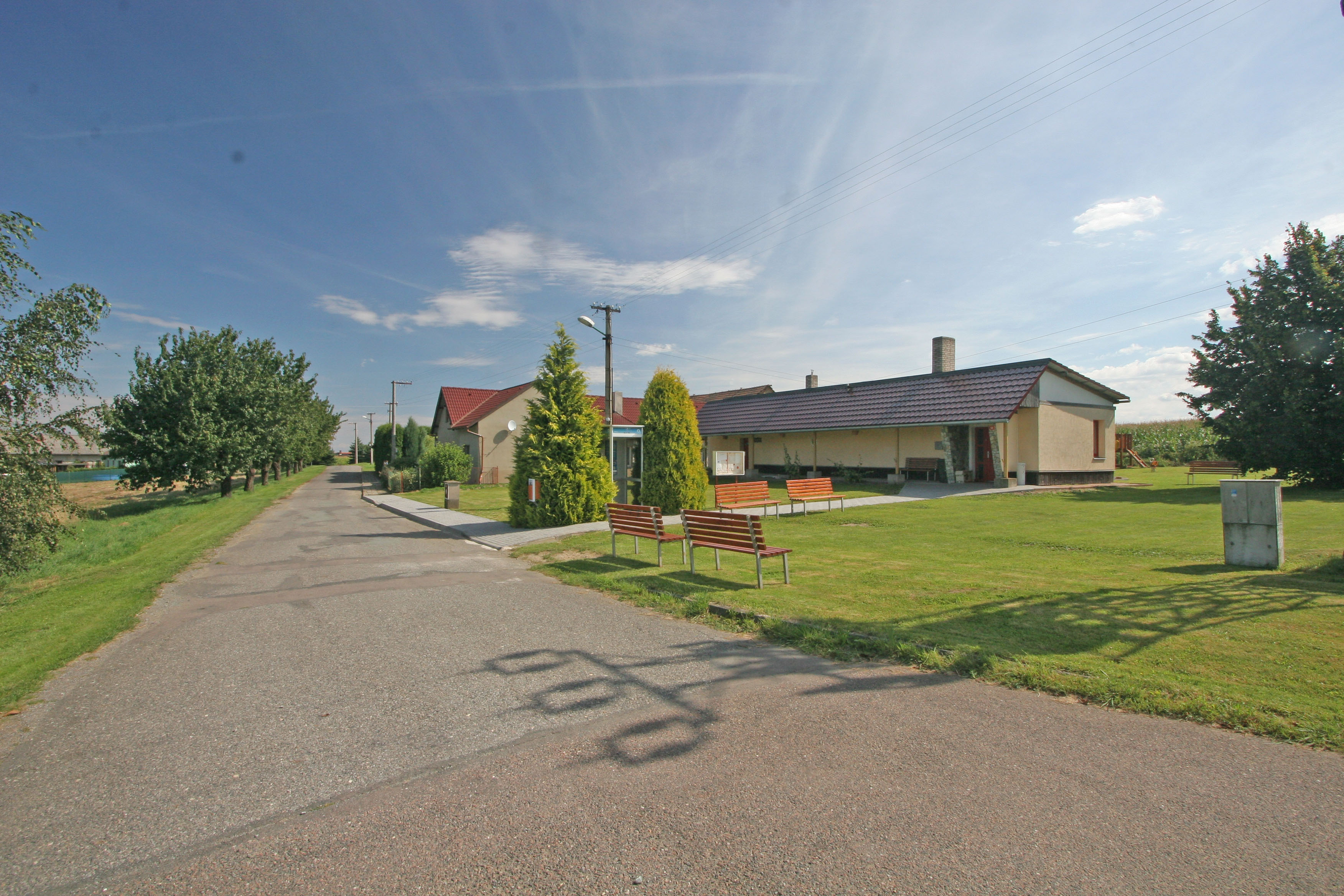
- Municipal office

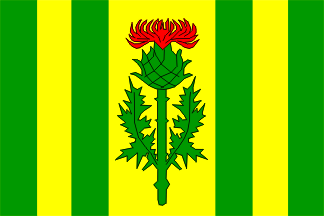
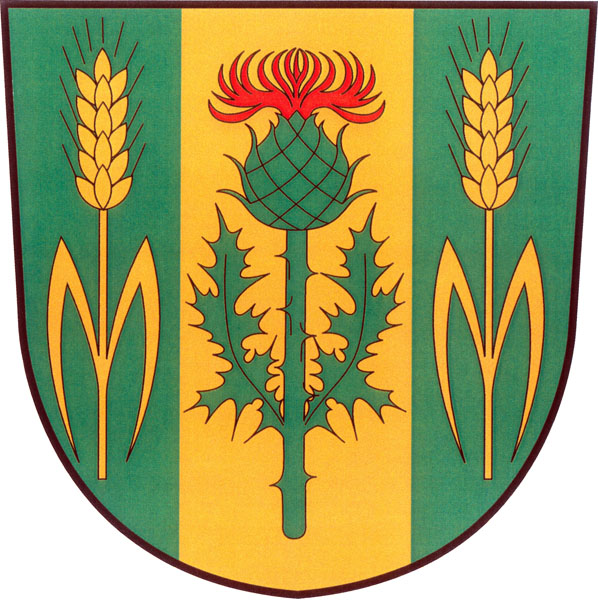
- Flag Coat of arms

- Location in the Czech Republic
- Coordinates: 49°56′45″N 15°34′49″E
- Country: Czech Republic
- Region: Pardubice
- District: Pardubice
- First mentioned: 1405

Area
  - Total: 2.77 km^{2} (1.07 sq mi)
- Elevation: 355 m (1,165 ft)

Population (2026-01-01)
  - Total: 67
  - Density: 24/km^{2} (63/sq mi)
- Time zone: UTC+1 (CET)
  - Summer (DST): UTC+2 (CEST)
- Postal code: 535 01
- Website: www.obecholotin.cz

Holotín is a municipality and village in Pardubice District in the Pardubice Region of the Czech Republic. It has about 70 inhabitants.

== Demographics ==
Historical population
Year	Pop.	±%
1869	134	—
1880	144	+7.5%
1890	154	+6.9%
1900	149	−3.2%
1910	170	+14.1%
1921	146	−14.1%
1930	142	−2.7%
1950	122	−14.1%
1961	107	−12.3%
1970	98	−8.4%
1980	76	−22.4%
1991	55	−27.6%
2001	38	−30.9%
2011	45	+18.4%
2021	62	+37.8%
Source: Censuses
