= Sopřeč =

- Municipality
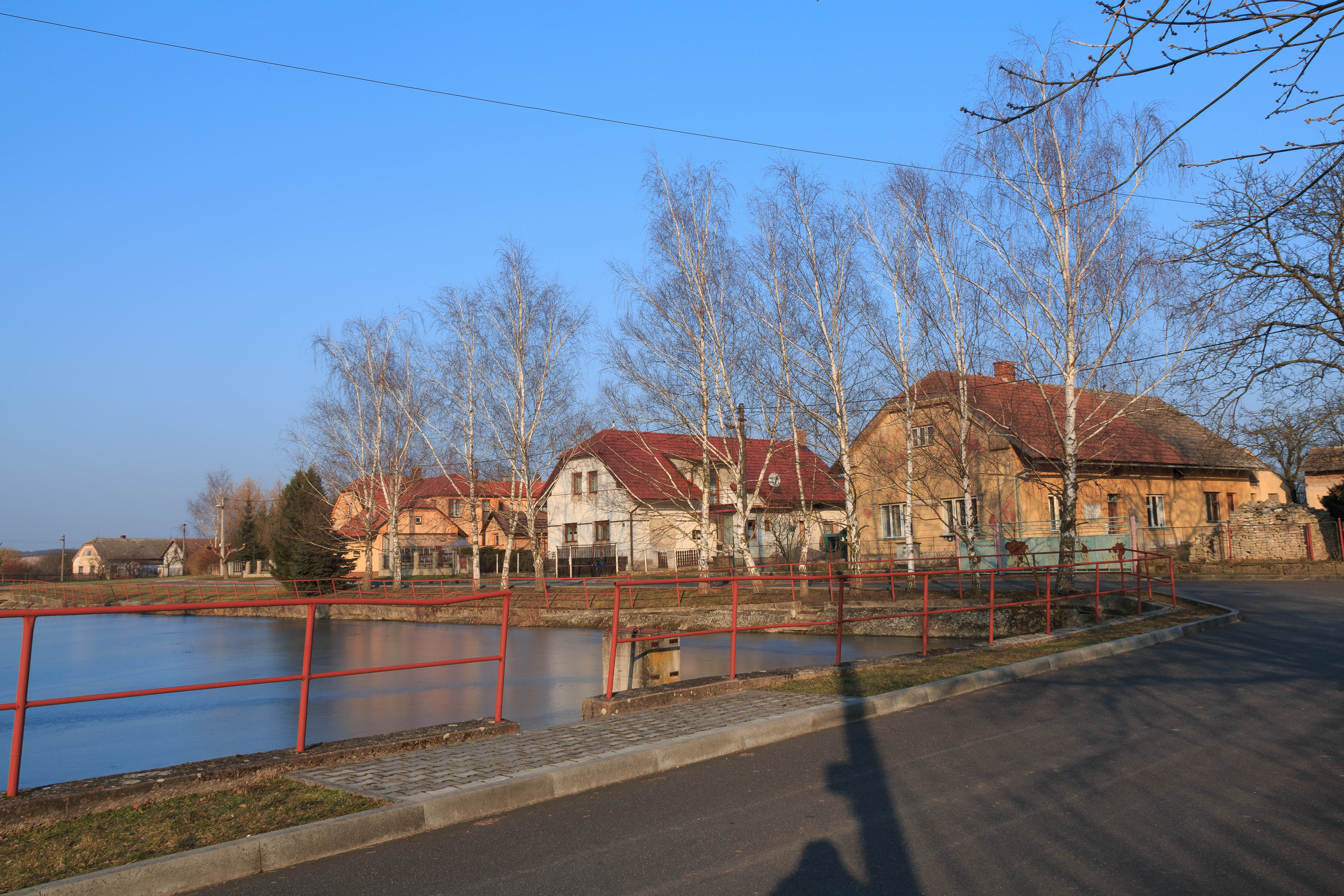
- Centre of Sopřeč

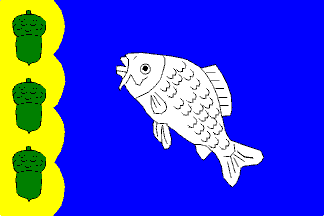
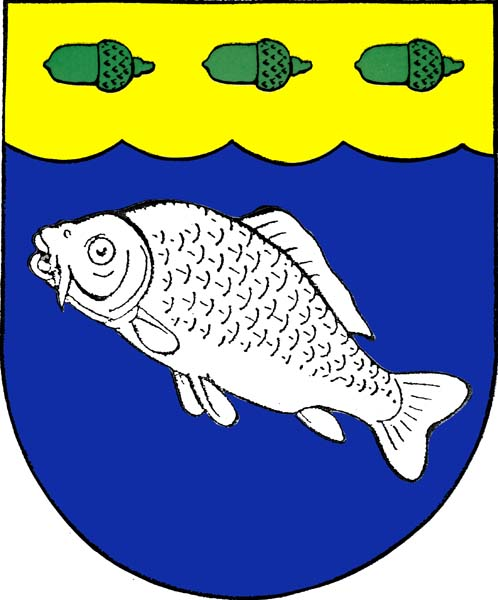
- Flag Coat of arms

- Location in the Czech Republic
- Coordinates: 50°5′37″N 15°33′24″E
- Country: Czech Republic
- Region: Pardubice
- District: Pardubice
- First mentioned: 1073

Area
  - Total: 6.55 km^{2} (2.53 sq mi)
- Elevation: 223 m (732 ft)

Population (2026-01-01)
  - Total: 378
  - Density: 57.7/km^{2} (149/sq mi)
- Time zone: UTC+1 (CET)
  - Summer (DST): UTC+2 (CEST)
- Postal code: 533 16
- Website: www.soprec.cz

Sopřeč is a municipality and village in Pardubice District in the Pardubice Region of the Czech Republic. It has about 400 inhabitants.

== Demographics ==
Historical population
Year	Pop.	±%
1869	439	—
1880	519	+18.2%
1890	502	−3.3%
1900	471	−6.2%
1910	530	+12.5%
1921	517	−2.5%
1930	512	−1.0%
1950	369	−27.9%
1961	377	+2.2%
1970	353	−6.4%
1980	307	−13.0%
1991	271	−11.7%
2001	277	+2.2%
2011	241	−13.0%
2021	284	+17.8%
Source: Censuses
