= Vyšehněvice =

- Municipality
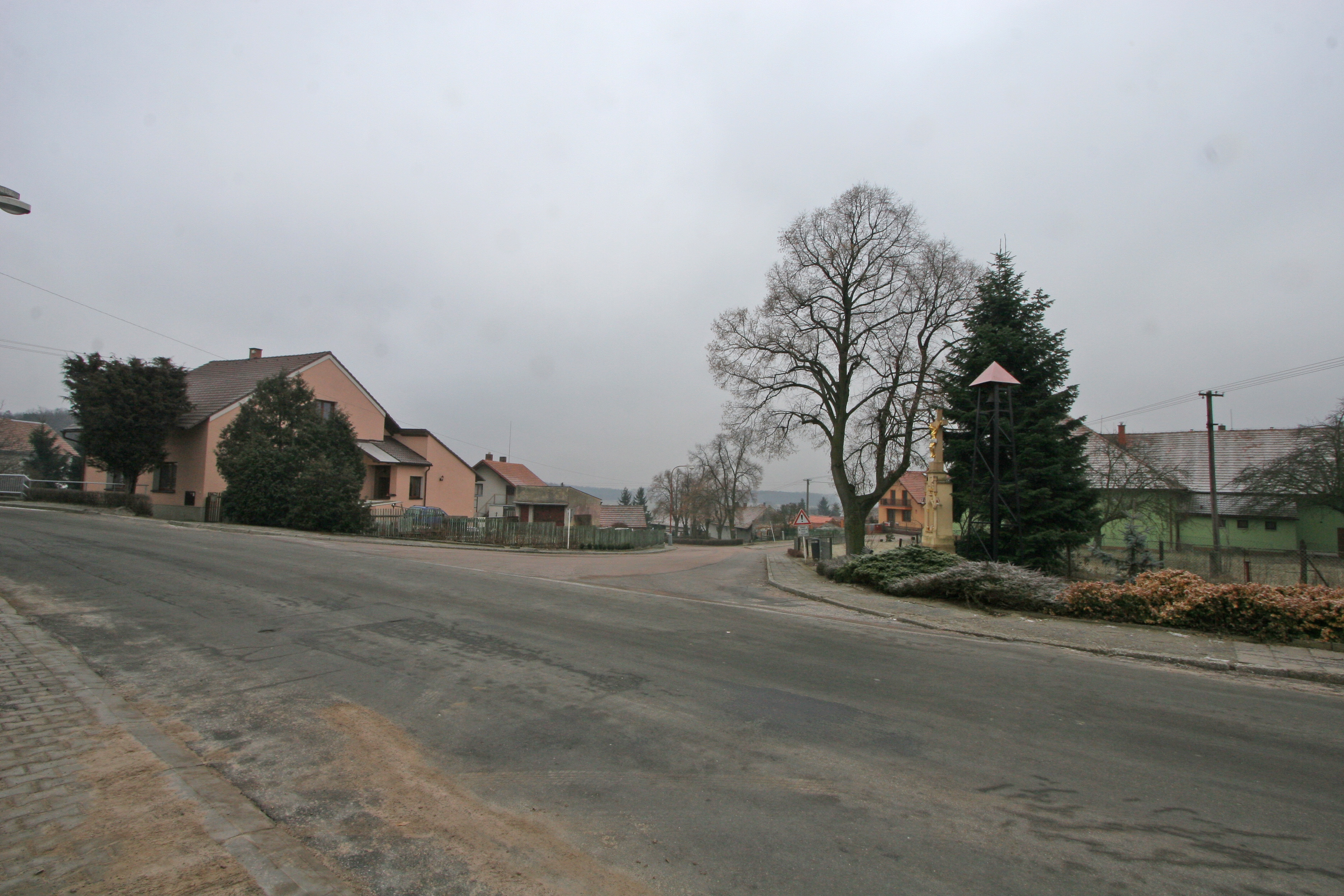
- Centre of Vyšehněvice

- Flag Coat of arms

- Location in the Czech Republic
- Coordinates: 50°6′8″N 15°35′1″E
- Country: Czech Republic
- Region: Pardubice
- District: Pardubice
- First mentioned: 1342

Area
  - Total: 4.17 km^{2} (1.61 sq mi)
- Elevation: 257 m (843 ft)

Population (2026-01-01)
  - Total: 258
  - Density: 61.9/km^{2} (160/sq mi)
- Time zone: UTC+1 (CET)
  - Summer (DST): UTC+2 (CEST)
- Postal code: 533 41
- Website: www.vysehnevice.cz

Vyšehněvice is a municipality and village in Pardubice District in the Pardubice Region of the Czech Republic. It has about 300 inhabitants.

== Demographics ==
Historical population
Year	Pop.	±%
1869	365	—
1880	365	+0.0%
1890	374	+2.5%
1900	380	+1.6%
1910	376	−1.1%
1921	368	−2.1%
1930	321	−12.8%
1950	237	−26.2%
1961	267	+12.7%
1970	248	−7.1%
1980	210	−15.3%
1991	245	+16.7%
2001	231	−5.7%
2011	215	−6.9%
2021	249	+15.8%
Source: Censuses
