= Pardubice District =

Pardubice District Okres Pardubice
- District
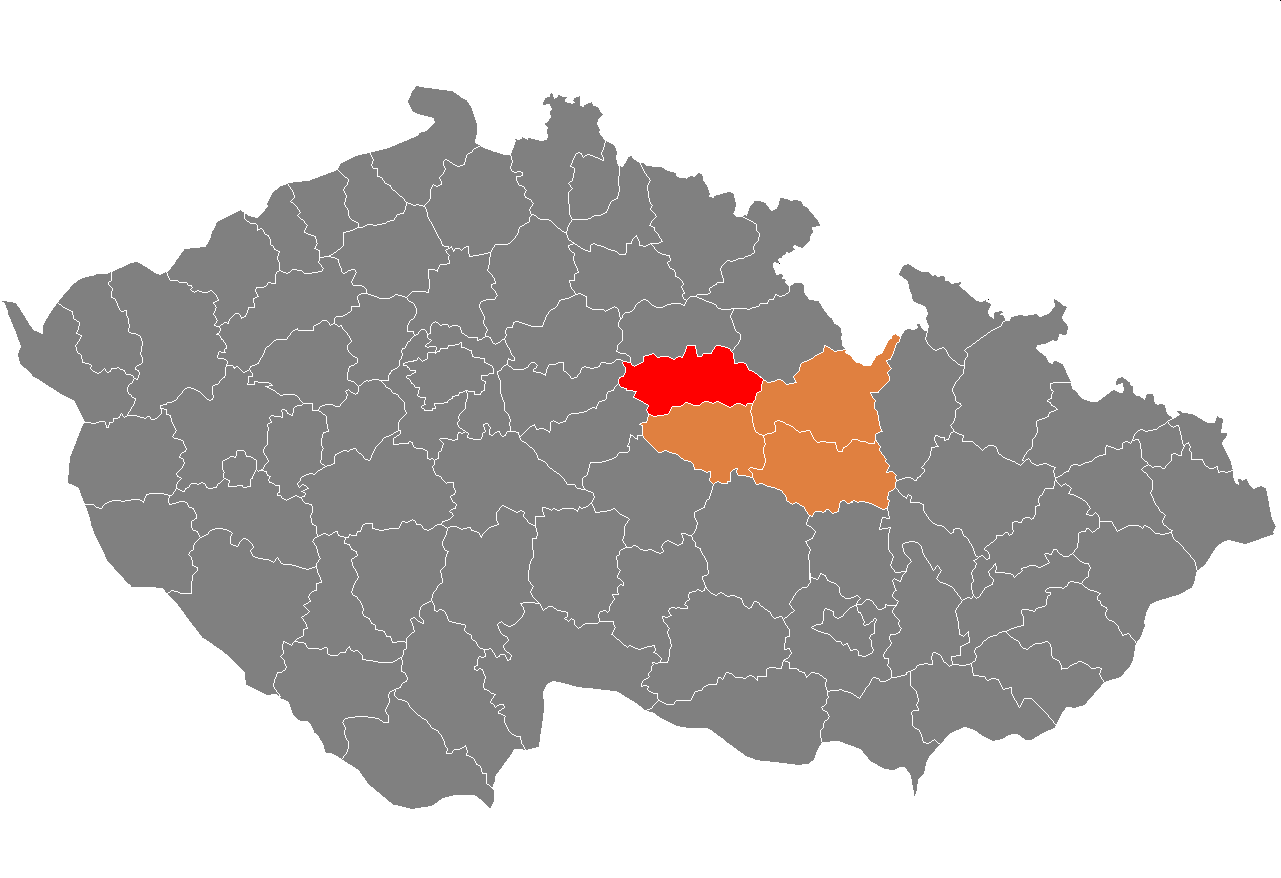
- Location in the Pardubice Region within the Czech Republic
- Coordinates: 50°5′N 15°46′E
- Country: Czech Republic
- Region: Pardubice
- Capital: Pardubice

Area
  - Total: 880.24 km^{2} (339.86 sq mi)

Population (2026)
  - Total: 181,657
  - Density: 206.37/km^{2} (534.50/sq mi)
- Time zone: UTC+1 (CET)
  - Summer (DST): UTC+2 (CEST)
- Municipalities: 112
- * Cities and towns: 8
- * Market towns: 1

Pardubice District (Czech: okres Pardubice) is a district in the Pardubice Region of the Czech Republic. Its capital is the city of Pardubice.

== Administrative division ==
Pardubice District is divided into three administrative districts of municipalities with extended competence: Pardubice, Holice and Přelouč.

=== List of municipalities ===
Cities and towns are marked in bold and market towns in italics:

Barchov - Bezděkov - Borek - Brloh - Břehy - Bukovina nad Labem - Bukovina u Přelouče - Bukovka - Býšť - Časy - Čeperka - Čepí - Černá u Bohdanče - Choltice - Choteč - Chrtníky - Chvaletice - Chvojenec - Chýšť - Dašice - Dolany - Dolní Roveň - Dolní Ředice - Dříteč - Dubany - Hlavečník - Holice - Holotín - Horní Jelení - Horní Ředice - Hrobice - Jankovice - Jaroslav - Jedousov - Jeníkovice - Jezbořice - Kasalice - Kladruby nad Labem - Kojice - Kostěnice - Křičeň - Kunětice - Labské Chrčice - Lány u Dašic - Lázně Bohdaneč - Libišany - Lipoltice - Litošice - Malé Výkleky - Mikulovice - Mokošín - Morašice - Moravany - Němčice - Neratov - Opatovice nad Labem - Ostřešany - Ostřetín - Pardubice - Plch - Poběžovice u Holic - Poběžovice u Přelouče - Podůlšany - Pravy - Přelouč - Přelovice - Přepychy - Ráby - Řečany nad Labem - Rohovládova Bělá - Rohoznice - Rokytno - Rybitví - Selmice - Semín - Sezemice - Slepotice - Sopřeč - Sovolusky - Spojil - Srch - Srnojedy - Staré Hradiště - Staré Jesenčany - Staré Ždánice - Starý Mateřov - Stéblová - Stojice - Strašov - Svinčany - Svojšice - Tetov - Trnávka - Trusnov - Třebosice - Turkovice - Uhersko - Úhřetická Lhota - Újezd u Přelouče - Újezd u Sezemic - Urbanice - Valy - Vápno - Veliny - Veselí - Vlčí Habřina - Voleč - Vysoké Chvojno - Vyšehněvice - Žáravice - Zdechovice - Živanice

== Geography ==
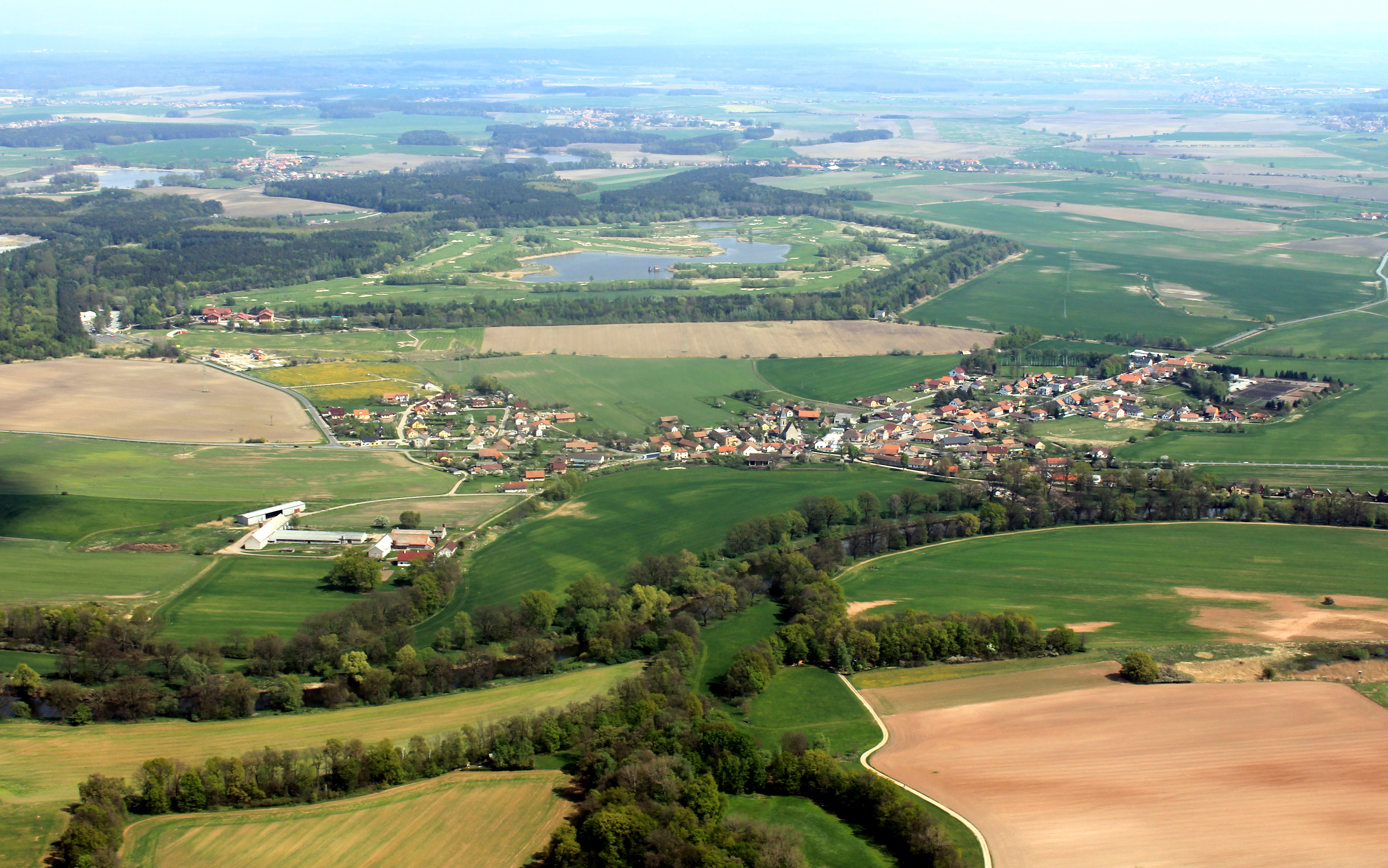
Dříteč and surrounding landscape

The terrain is mostly flat and belongs to the Polabí region. The territory extends into four geomorphological mesoregions: East Elbe Table (most of the territory), Svitavy Uplands (south), Orlice Table (east), and Iron Mountains (southwest). The highest point of the district is a contour line in Holotín with an elevation of 398 m (1,306 ft), the lowest point is the river bed of the Elbe in Kojice at 201 m (659 ft).

From the total district area of 880.2 km^{2} (339.8 sq mi), agricultural land occupies 521.4 km^{2} (201.3 sq mi), forests occupy 222.2 km^{2} (85.8 sq mi), and water area occupies 27.1 km^{2} (10.5 sq mi). Forests cover 25.2% of the district's area.

The most important river is the Elbe, which flows across the district from northeast to west. Its largest tributaries within the district are the Chrudimka and Loučná. There are relatively many bodies of water in the area, which are not only ponds, but also artificial lakes created by flooding gravel quarries. The largest body of water is Bohdanečský Pond with an area of 160 ha (400 acres).

There are no large-scale protected areas.

== Demographics ==
Historical population

Year	Pop.	±%
1869	81,208	—
1880	90,778	+11.8%
1890	94,467	+4.1%
1900	99,973	+5.8%
1910	110,095	+10.1%

Year	Pop.	±%
1921	113,000	+2.6%
1930	119,905	+6.1%
1950	118,008	−1.6%
1961	138,579	+17.4%
1970	149,563	+7.9%

Year	Pop.	±%
1980	163,271	+9.2%
1991	162,772	−0.3%
2001	160,658	−1.3%
2011	168,423	+4.8%
2021	173,206	+2.8%

Source: Censuses

=== Most populous municipalities ===
Name	Population	Area (km^{2})
Pardubice	92,713	83
Přelouč	10,195	30
Holice	6,783	20
Sezemice	4,393	22
Lázně Bohdaneč	3,323	22
Opatovice nad Labem	2,968	12
Chvaletice	2,897	9
Dašice	2,773	18
Horní Jelení	2,149	24
Dolní Roveň	2,148	29

== Economy ==
The largest employers with headquarters in Pardubice District and at least 1,000 employees are:

Economic entity	Location	Number of employees	Main activity
Regional Hospital Pardubice	Pardubice	5,000–9,999	Health care
JIP východočeská	Pardubice	2,000–2,499	Wholesale trade
Panasonic Automotive Systems Czech	Pardubice	1,500–1,999	Manufacture of electronic components
Regional Police Directorate of the Pardubice Region	Pardubice	1,500–1,999	Public order and safety activities
University of Pardubice	Pardubice	1,500–1,999	Education
Kiekert-CS	Přelouč	1,500–1,999	Manufacture of lock systems for automotive industry
Foxconn CZ	Pardubice	1,000–1,499	Manufacture of components for computers
Foxconn European Manufacturing Services	Pardubice	1,000–1,499	Manufacture of components for computers
Synthesia	Pardubice	1,000–1,499	Chemical industry

== Transport ==
The D11 motorway from Prague to Hradec Králové (part of the European route E67) runs along the northern district border. The D35 motorway (European route E442) separates from the D11, which runs across the eastern part of the district and, after its completion, will connect the district with Olomouc.

Pardubice Airport is located in the district. It is one of the six public international airports in the country.

== Sights ==
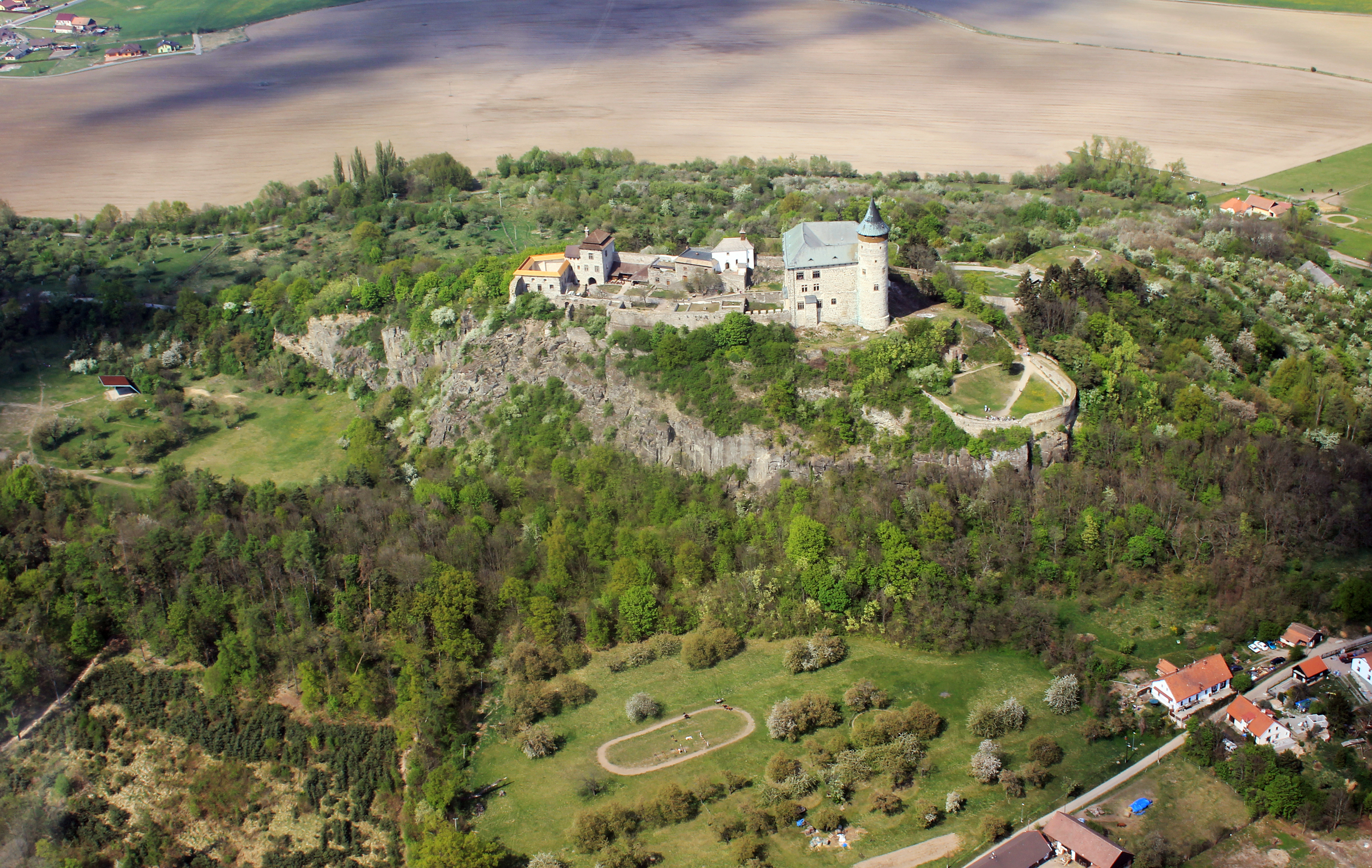
Kunětická hora Castle

The Landscape for Breeding and Training of Ceremonial Carriage Horses at Kladruby nad Labem was designated a UNESCO World Heritage Site in 2019. According to UNESCO, it is a unique example of a cultural landscape designed to breed and train the Kladruber horses and an outstanding example of the ferme ornée style of landscape architecture.

The most important monuments in the district, protected as national cultural monuments, are:

- Zámeček reverent area in Pardubice
- National Stud Farm in Kladruby nad Labem
- Kunětická hora Castle
- Pardubice Castle
- Pardubice Crematorium
- Winternitz automatic mills in Pardubice
- Larisch Villa in Pardubice

The best-preserved settlements and landscapes, protected as monument reservations and monument zones, are:

- Pardubice (monument reservation)
- Dašice (monument zone)
- Kladrubské Polabí landscape (monument zone)

The most visited tourist destinations are the Museum of East Bohemia in Pardubice and National Stud Farm in Kladruby nad Labem.
