= Poběžovice u Holic =

- Municipality
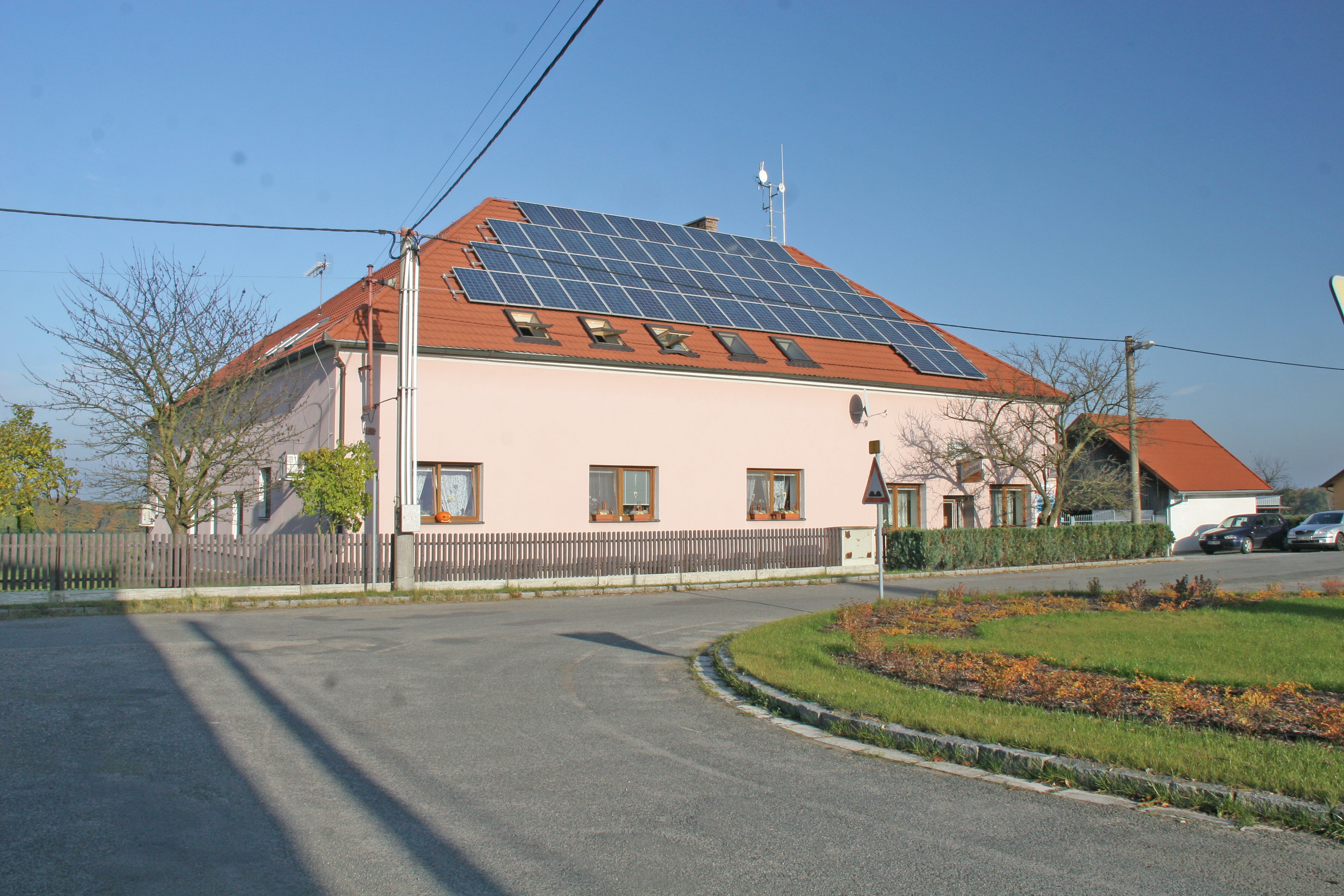
- Centre of Poběžovice u Holic

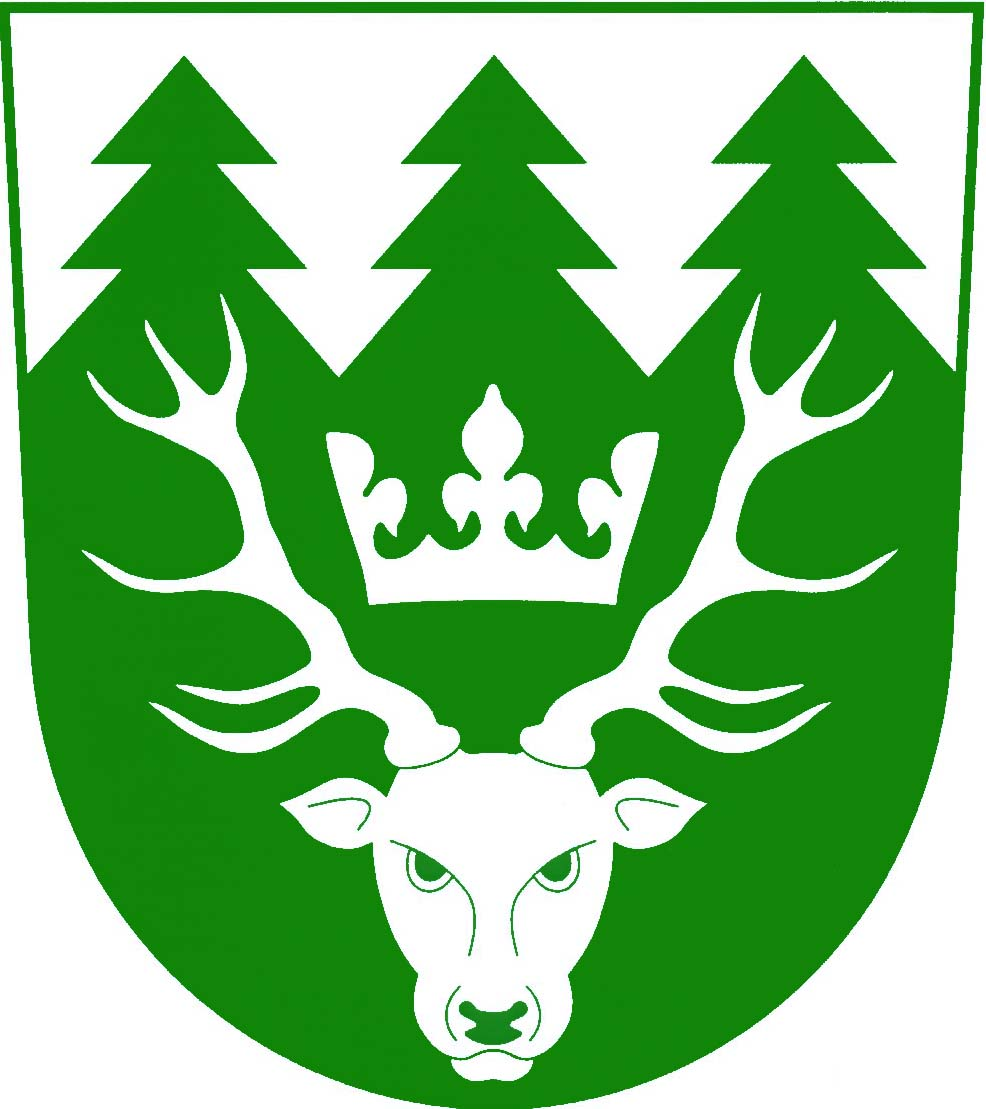
- Flag Coat of arms

- Location in the Czech Republic
- Coordinates: 50°5′51″N 16°0′3″E
- Country: Czech Republic
- Region: Pardubice
- District: Pardubice
- First mentioned: 1494

Area
  - Total: 13.43 km^{2} (5.19 sq mi)
- Elevation: 321 m (1,053 ft)

Population (2026-01-01)
  - Total: 314
  - Density: 23.4/km^{2} (60.6/sq mi)
- Time zone: UTC+1 (CET)
  - Summer (DST): UTC+2 (CEST)
- Postal code: 534 01
- Website: www.obecpobezovice.cz

Poběžovice u Holic is a municipality and village in Pardubice District in the Pardubice Region of the Czech Republic. It has about 300 inhabitants.

== Demographics ==
Historical population
Year	Pop.	±%
1869	394	—
1880	386	−2.0%
1890	387	+0.3%
1900	432	+11.6%
1910	429	−0.7%
1921	401	−6.5%
1930	386	−3.7%
1950	280	−27.5%
1961	278	−0.7%
1970	242	−12.9%
1980	200	−17.4%
1991	176	−12.0%
2001	194	+10.2%
2011	215	+10.8%
2021	280	+30.2%
Source: Censuses
