= Deaths in August 2008 =

The following is a list of notable deaths in August 2008.

Entries for each day are listed alphabetically by surname. A typical entry lists information in the following sequence:

- Name, age, country of citizenship at birth, subsequent country of citizenship (if applicable), reason for notability, cause of death (if known), and reference.

== August 2008 ==
=== 1 ===
- Leopoldo Alas Mínguez, 45, Spanish writer, poet and editor.
- Carlos Aponte, 69, Colombian footballer.
- Rolf Bae, 33, Norwegian mountaineer, climbing accident.
- Pauline Baynes, 85, British illustrator (The Chronicles of Narnia, The Lord of the Rings).
- Peter Jackson, 80, Australian fashion designer, prostate cancer.
- Ashok Mankad, 61, Indian cricketer.
- Chief Mqalo, 91, South African Chief of the AmaKhuze Tribe, Alice.
- Harkishan Singh Surjeet, 92, Indian politician, cardiac arrest.
- Butch White, 72, British cricketer (Hampshire, Glamorgan, England).

=== 2 ===
- Fujio Akatsuka, 72, Japanese manga artist, pneumonia.
- Frederic Apcar, 93, Russian-born French acrobatic dancer and producer/impresario.
- Thomas Ashton, 3rd Baron Ashton of Hyde, 81, British aristocrat and banker.
- Geoffrey Ballard, 76, Canadian businessman and fuel cell scientist, founder of Ballard Power Systems.
- Pérez Celis, 69, Argentine plastic artist, leukaemia.
- Affonso Évora, 89, Brazilian Olympic bronze medal-winning (1948) basketball player.
- Helga Gitmark, 78, Norwegian politician.
- Christopher González, 65, Jamaican sculptor and painter, cancer.
- Kåre Grøndahl Hagem, 93, Norwegian politician.
- Meherban Karim, 29, Pakistani mountaineer, climbing accident.
- Allen Kolstad, 76, American politician, lieutenant governor of Montana (1988–1991), cancer.
- Ger McDonnell, 37, Irish mountaineer, first Irishman to reach K2 summit, climbing accident.
- Peter Rodman, 64, American foreign policy expert, leukemia.
- John F. Seiberling, 89, American politician, representative from Ohio (1971–1987), respiratory failure.

=== 3 ===
- Anton Allemann, 72, Swiss footballer (PSV Eindhoven, 1. FC Nürnberg, Grasshopper Zürich), heart attack.
- Skip Caray, 68, American broadcaster for baseball (Atlanta Braves) and basketball (Atlanta Hawks), bronchitis.
- Erik Darling, 74, American songwriter, folk musician, lymphoma.
- Roger Dean, 65, British guitarist, brain cancer.
- Babatunde Jose, 82, Nigerian journalist and newspaper editor.
- Jeffrey S. Medkeff, 39, American astronomer and science writer, liver cancer.
- Robert Montgomery, 78, American lawyer.
- Aurelius H. Piper Sr., 92, American hereditary chief of the Golden Hill Paugussett Indian Nation since 1959, natural causes.
- Aleksandr Solzhenitsyn, 89, Russian novelist and historian, Nobel Prize winner (1970), heart failure.
- Louis Teicher, 83, American classical pianist (Ferrante & Teicher), heart failure.

=== 4 ===
- Alberto Achacaz Walakial, 79, Chilean craftsman, one of the last full-blooded Alacaluf, blood poisoning.
- Sally Insul, 92, American actress (Click), heart failure.
- Craig Jones, 23, British motorcycle racer, head injuries from a race crash.
- Peter Kass, 85, American actor, director and teacher.
- Eri Kawai, 43, Japanese pop and classical singer, liver cancer.
- Victor McCaffery, 89, Australian cricketer.
- Robert Maheu, 90, American businessman, aide to Howard Hughes.
- Nicola Rescigno, 92, American opera conductor, complications from broken femur.
- Johnny Thio, 63, Belgian football player and coach, myocardial rupture.
- Greg Weld, 64, American racing driver and businessman, heart attack.

=== 5 ===
- Aziz Abdullah Ahmed, 80–81, Iraqi Kurdish judge, Alzheimer's disease.
- Jaroslav Alexa, 59, Czech Olympic athlete.
- Bruno Dallansky, 79, Austrian actor.
- Robert Hazard, 59, American musician and songwriter ("Girls Just Want to Have Fun"), pancreatic cancer.
- Jack Kamen, 88, American comic book artist (Tales from the Crypt, The Vault of Horror), cancer.
- Reg Lindsay, 79, Australian country music singer and songwriter, pneumonia.
- Shelby Linville, 78, American basketball player (Kentucky Wildcats), cancer.
- José Medellín, 33, Mexican convicted murderer, execution in Texas by lethal injection.
- Gary Mooney, 78, American animator (Sleeping Beauty, Lady and the Tramp, George of the Jungle), cancer.
- Daniel L. Norris, 73, Canadian commissioner of the Northwest Territories (1989–1994), heart failure.
- Eva Pflug, 79, German actress (Raumpatrouille Orion).
- Manuel d'Almeida Trindade, 90, Portuguese bishop of the Roman Catholic Diocese of Aveiro (1962–1988).

=== 6 ===
- Bertil Ahlin, 81, Swedish boxer.
- Robert Nason Beck, 80, American scientist, myelodysplasia.
- John K. Cooley, 80, American author (Unholy Wars), journalist and expert of Middle East affairs, cancer.
- Ela-Mana-Mou, 32, British Thoroughbred race horse and sire, euthanized.
- Gene Galusha, 66, American actor and narrator.
- Ken Going, 66, New Zealand rugby union player (North Auckland, national team), pancreatic cancer.
- Roy Howard, 85, Australian cricketer.
- Karl Kuehl, 70, American baseball scout, coach and manager (Montreal Expos), pulmonary fibrosis.
- Tony Russo, 71, American whistleblower (Pentagon Papers).
- Jud Taylor, 68, American television director and actor (Dr. Kildare, Star Trek, Law & Order: Special Victims Unit), kidney failure.
- Reg Whitehouse, 75, Canadian football player (Saskatchewan Roughriders).

=== 7 ===
- Bernie Brillstein, 77, American film producer (Ghostbusters, The Blues Brothers, ALF), chronic pulmonary disease.
- Juan Bustos Ramírez, 72, Chilean politician, liver cancer.
- Simon Gray, 71, British playwright, abdominal aortic aneurysm.
- Ralph Klein, 77, Israeli basketball player and coach, intestinal cancer.
- Andrea Pininfarina, 51, Italian businessman, CEO of Pininfarina, motorcycle accident.
- Clarence Rost, 94, Canadian ice hockey player.

=== 8 ===
- Ann-Mari Aasland, 93, Norwegian politician.
- Rio Alex Bulo, 30, Indonesian Serial Killer
- Ralph Edward Dodge, 101, American bishop of the Methodist Church.
- Antonio Gava, 78, Italian politician, minister of the interior (1988–1990), after long illness.
- Orville Moody, 74, American professional golfer, winner of 1969 U.S. Open.
- Eleo Pomare, 70, Colombian modern dance choreographer, cancer.
- Henk Starreveld, 94, Dutch Olympic canoer.

=== 9 ===
- Giorgi Antsukhelidze, 23, Georgian soldier, shot.
- Sir Stanley Bailey, 81, British chief constable of Northumbria Police (1975–1991).
- Peter Coe, 88, British athletics coach, father of Sebastian Coe.
- Colm Condon, 87, Irish lawyer, Attorney General (1965–1973).
- Bob Cunis, 67, New Zealand cricketer.
- Mahmoud Darwish, 67, Palestinian poet, complications from open heart surgery.
- Archie Elliott, Lord Elliott, 85, British judge.
- Ken Griffiths, 78, English footballer (Port Vale).
- Jacob Landau, 74, American journalist, attorney, co-founder of Reporters Committee for Freedom of the Press.
- Bernie Mac, 50, American comedian and actor (The Bernie Mac Show, Ocean's Eleven, Friday), complications from pneumonia.
- Gilbert Morand, 85, French military patrol runner.
- Roy Simmonds, 79, Australian rules footballer (Hawthorn), cancer.
- Greg Urwin, 61, Australian diplomat, Secretary General of the Pacific Islands Forum (2004–2008), cancer.
- Denis Vetchinov, 32, Russian army major, recipient of Hero of the Russian Federation award, killed in action.
- Vivian Shun-wen Wu, 95, Taiwanese entrepreneur, chairwoman of Yulon Motor, heart failure.

=== 10 ===
- Louise Armstrong, 71, American children's writer.
- Chaim Banai, 71, Israeli actor (For My Father), cardiac arrest.
- Sir William Christie, 95, North Irish politician, Lord Mayor of Belfast (1972–1975).
- Lee Clark, 71, Canadian politician, MP for Brandon—Souris (1983–1993).
- John Esmonde, 71, British television writer, half of Esmonde and Larbey (Please Sir!, The Good Life).
- Isaac Hayes, 65, American soul and funk musician ("Theme from Shaft") and actor (South Park, The Rockford Files), Oscar winner (1972), stroke.
- Cezmi Kartay, 88, Turkish civil servant and politician (chairman of SODEP).
- William A. Knowlton, 88, American general.
- Howard G. Minsky, 94, American film producer (Love Story).
- Terence Rigby, 71, British actor (Get Carter, Watership Down, Mona Lisa Smile), lung cancer.
- Alexander Slobodyanik, 65, Ukrainian pianist, meningitis.
- František Tikal, 75, Czech ice hockey player.
- David Young, 76, British Bishop of Ripon (1977–1999).

=== 11 ===
- Arase Nagahide, 59, Japanese sumo wrestler, heart failure.
- Agneta Bolme Börjefors, 67, Swedish television presenter and royal reporter.
- Sheikh Abdul Aziz, 55–56, Kashmir politician, shot.
- Henry B. R. Brown, 82, American investment banker, aneurysm.
- John S. Bull, 73, American NASA astronaut.
- Sir Bill Cotton, 80, British television executive.
- George Deem, 75, American artist, lung cancer.
- George Furth, 75, American playwright (Company) and actor (Blazing Saddles, The Cannonball Run).
- Don Helms, 81, American steel guitarist.
- James Hoyt, 83, American soldier, member of the Buchenwald liberation team.
- Anatoly Khrapaty, 45, Kazakh Olympic weightlifter (USSR and Kazakhstan), motorcycle accident.
- Günther Schifter, 84, Austrian journalist and radio presenter.
- Fred Sinowatz, 79, Austrian politician, chancellor of Austria (1983–1986).
- Darren Taylor, 42, American gang member turned peacemaker, cancer.
- Rhoshii Wells, 31, American boxer, Olympic medallist, shot.

=== 12 ===
- Christie Allen, 53, Australian pop singer, pancreatic cancer.
- Michael Baxandall, 74, British art historian, Parkinson's disease.
- Gilles Bilodeau, 53, Canadian NHL and World Hockey Association player (Quebec Nordiques).
- Mick Clough, 80, Australian politician, member of the New South Wales Legislative Assembly (1976–1988, 1991–1999).
- Dottie Wiltse Collins, 84, American AAGPBL baseball pitcher (Fort Wayne Daisies).
- Leon Dorsey, 32, American serial killer, execution by lethal injection.
- Donald Erb, 81, American avant-garde composer.
- George Gick, 92, American Major League Baseball player (Chicago White Sox).
- Rust Hills, 83, American fiction editor (Esquire), cardiac arrest.
- Lester Hogan, 88, American physicist, complications of Alzheimer's disease.
- Vilma Jamnická, 101, Czechoslovak actress and astrologer.
- Francis Lacassin, 76, French editor.
- Patricia W. Malone, 84, American naval officer.
- Aditya Prakash, 84, Indian architect.
- Herm Schneidman, 94, American football player (Green Bay Packers).
- Stan Storimans, 39, Dutch photojournalist and cameraman, mortar fire.
- Bill Stulla, 97, American children's television show host.

=== 13 ===
- Sandy Allen, 53, American tallest woman in the world (according to Guinness World Records).
- Henri Cartan, 104, French mathematician.
- Bill Gwatney, 48, American politician, Arkansas state senator (1992–2002), Democratic Party of Arkansas chairman, shot.
- John MacDougall, 60, British politician, MP for Glenrothes since 2005 and Central Fife (2001–2005), mesothelioma.
- Nollaig Ó Gadhra, 64, Irish language activist, journalist and historian, co-founder of Teilifís na Gaeilge.
- Roy Prosser, 66, Australian international rugby union player, heart attack.
- Dino Toso, 39, Italian automotive engineer, Renault F1 director of aerodynamics, cancer.
- Jack Weil, 107, American founder of Rockmount Ranch Wear, oldest working CEO.
- Stuart Cary Welch, 80, American scholar and collector of Indian and Islamic art.

=== 14 ===
- Seiji Aochi, 66, Japanese ski jumper, stomach cancer.
- Sandy Bruce-Lockhart, Baron Bruce-Lockhart, 66, British politician and local government leader, cancer.
- Ralph Feigin, 70, American pediatrician, lung cancer.
- Luigi Grossi, 83, Italian Olympic sprinter.
- Percy Irausquin, 39, Aruban fashion designer, cerebral hemorrhage.
- Carlton John, 92–93, Trinidadian West Indian cricket umpire.
- Marius Maziers, 93, French prelate of the Roman Catholic Church.
- Michael Anthony Rodriguez, 45, American murderer, member of the Texas Seven, execution by lethal injection.
- Lita Roza, 82, British singer, first British female to top the UK singles chart.
- Bob Worthington, 72, American honorary consul of the Cook Islands to the United States (1985–2008).

=== 15 ===
- Carlos Meglia, 50, Argentine comic book artist (Cybersix).
- James Orthwein, 84, American businessman, cancer.
- Gladys Powers, 109, British-born last World War I veteran living in Canada, served with the WAAC and WRAF.
- Leroy Sievers, 53, American journalist, colon cancer.
- Vic Toweel, 79, South African boxer, bantamweight world champion (1952–1954).
- Jerry Wexler, 91, American record producer, heart failure.
- Darrin Winston, 42, American baseball player (Philadelphia Phillies, 1997–1998), leukemia.

=== 16 ===
- Hugh Butt, 98, American physician.
- Dorival Caymmi, 94, Brazilian songwriter and singer, multiple organ failure.
- Roberta Collins, 63, American actress (Death Race 2000, Eaten Alive), drug overdose.
- Michel-Gaspard Coppenrath, 84, Tahitian archbishop of Papeete (1973–1999), ruptured aneurysm.
- Ronnie Drew, 73, Irish singer, founding member of The Dubliners, throat cancer.
- Jack Dunham, 98, American animator and television producer, creator of the St. Hubert Chicken.
- Masanobu Fukuoka, 95, Japanese microbiologist, pioneer of no-till grain cultivation.
- Elena Leușteanu, 73, Romanian gymnast and three-time Olympic medalist, pancreatic cancer.
- Fanny Mikey, 78, Argentine-born Colombian theatre actress, renal failure.
- Johnny Moore, 70, Jamaican trumpeter, founding member of The Skatalites, cancer.
- Alfred Rainer, 20, Austrian Nordic combined skier, paragliding accident.
- Helge Uuetoa, 71, Estonian stage designer, beaten.

=== 17 ===
- Marie Fisher, 77, Australian politician, Member of the New South Wales Legislative Council (1978–1988).
- Dave Freeman, 47, American author (100 Things To Do Before You Die), injuries from fall.
- Maudie Hopkins, 93, last certified American Civil War widow.
- Sir Edwin Nixon, 83, English businessman, chief executive of IBM UK.
- Philip Saffman, 77, American mathematician.
- Franco Sensi, 82, Italian businessman, president of A.S. Roma since 1993, respiratory failure.

=== 18 ===
- Kazys Abromavičius, 80, Lithuanian painter.
- Jeannette Eyerly, 100, American author and columnist.
- Manny Farber, 91, American film critic and painter.
- Bob Humphrys, 56, British BBC sports presenter, lung cancer.
- Genuine Risk, 31, American racehorse, 1980 Kentucky Derby winner.
- Pervis Jackson, 70, American R&B bass singer (The Spinners), cancer.
- Jumoke, 18, American western lowland gorilla, complications of early pregnancy.
- Floyd Peters, 72, American football player, complications from Alzheimer's disease.

=== 19 ===
- Leo Abse, 91, British politician, MP (1958–1987), reformer of laws on homosexuality and divorce.
- Carlos Arguelles, 90, Filipino architect.
- Julius Carry, 56, American actor (The Last Dragon, Disco Godfather, Two Guys, a Girl and a Pizza Place), pancreatic cancer.
- Binyamin Gibli, 89, Israeli head of military intelligence.
- Algimantas Masiulis, 77, Lithuanian actor.
- Habib Miyan, 130 or 139, Indian man and longevity claimant.
- LeRoi Moore, 46, American saxophonist (Dave Matthews Band), complications from ATV accident.
- Mikhail Mukasei, 101, Russian spy.
- Levy Mwanawasa, 59, Zambian politician, president since 2002, complications from stroke.
- Diane Webber, 76, American model and actress.

=== 20 ===
- Tunku Abdullah, 83, Malaysian businessman.
- Mario Bertok, 79, Croatian chess grandmaster and journalist, drowned.
- Marshall Brown, 90, American basketball player and coach.
- Chao Yao-tung, 92, Taiwanese minister of economic affairs, multiple organ dysfunction syndrome.
- Ed Freeman, 80, American U.S. Army helicopter pilot, recipient of the Medal of Honor, complications of Parkinson's disease.
- Phil Guy, 68, American blues guitarist, brother of Buddy Guy, pancreatic cancer.
- Larry Hennessy, 79, American basketball player (Philadelphia Warriors, Syracuse Nationals).
- Hua Guofeng, 87, Chinese premier (1976–1980), chairman of the Chinese Communist Party (1976–1981).
- Clair Isbister, 92, Australian paediatrician.
- Edward Jaworski, 82, American Olympic water polo player (1952).
- Dick Jones, 97, American politician.
- Eric Longworth, 90, British actor (Dad's Army).
- Leopoldo Serran, 66, Brazilian screenwriter, liver cancer.
- Stephanie Tubbs Jones, 58, American member of the House of Representatives from Ohio since 1999, cerebral hemorrhage.
- Gene Upshaw, 63, American NFL player (Oakland Raiders), executive director of NFLPA, pancreatic cancer.

=== 21 ===
- Robert E. Armstrong, 82, American politician.
- Fred Crane, 90, American film and television actor (Gone with the Wind), complications from surgery.
- Iosif Constantin Drăgan, 91, Romanian businessman and historian.
- Jerry Finn, 39, American record producer (Blink-182, Green Day, Morrissey), cerebral hemorrhage.
- Don Fox, 72, British rugby league player (Wakefield).
- Buddy Harman, 79, American session musician, heart failure.
- Lee Eon, 27, South Korean actor and model, motorcycle accident.
- Ágústa Þorsteinsdóttir, 66, Icelandic Olympic swimmer.
- Laurence Urdang, 81, American lexicographer, heart failure.
- Wolfgang Vogel, 82, German lawyer, negotiator in prisoner exchange programs during the Cold War.

=== 22 ===
- Kenny Ailshie, 59, American horse trainer, suicide by gunshot.
- Frank Cornish, 40, American football player (Dallas Cowboys), apparent heart attack.
- James H. Faulkner, 92, American publisher, politician and educator.
- Jeff MacKay, 59, American actor (Magnum, P.I., Tales of the Gold Monkey, JAG), liver complications.
- Michael J. Manning, 65, Australian-born Papua New Guinean anti-corruption activist and economist, heart attack.
- Muriel Kallis Steinberg Newman, 94, American abstract expressionist art collector, natural causes.
- Robert Pintenat, 60, French football player.
- Ralph Young, 90, American singer (Sandler and Young).

=== 23 ===
- Jimmy Cleveland, 82, American jazz trombonist.
- Ruth Cohen, 78, American actress (Seinfeld), heart attack.
- Leo Elter, 78, American football player (Pittsburgh Steelers, Washington Redskins), heart failure.
- Steve Foley, 49, American drummer (The Replacements, Bash & Pop), drug overdose.
- Doris Gibson, 98, Peruvian journalist, founder of Caretas magazine.
- Ian Hibell, 74, British cyclist, hit and run car crash.
- Yuri Nosenko, 81, Soviet-born Ukrainian KGB agent who defected to United States, after a long illness.
- John Russell, 89, British-born American art critic and author.
- Thomas Huckle Weller, 93, American virologist, Nobel Prize winner (Medicine, 1954).

=== 24 ===
- Gerard W. Ford, 83, American co-founder of Ford Modeling Agency, endocarditis.
- Riitta Immonen, 90, Finnish fashion designer and entrepreneur, co-founder of Marimekko.
- Tad Mosel, 86, American Pulitzer Prize–winning playwright (All the Way Home).
- Morris Sullivan, 91, American film producer (All Dogs Go to Heaven).
- Peter Sutton, 65, British sound engineer (The Empire Strikes Back, The Dark Crystal, Little Shop of Horrors), Oscar winner (1981), leukemia.
- Wei Wei, 88, Chinese poet and writer, liver cancer.

=== 25 ===
- Elmer H. Antonsen, 78, American philologist.
- Randa Chahal Sabag, 54, Lebanese film maker, cancer.
- Marpessa Dawn, 74, American actress (Black Orpheus), heart attack.
- Kevin Duckworth, 44, American NBA basketball player, heart failure resulting from hypertrophic cardiomyopathy.
- Ahmad Faraz, 74, Pakistani poet.
- Hardwicke Knight, 97, New Zealand historian and photographer.
- Pavle Kozjek, 49, Slovenian mountaineer, climbing accident.
- Jabir Herbert Muhammad, 79, American businessman, long-time manager of Muhammad Ali, complications from heart surgery.
- Vassili Nesterenko, 73, Belarusian physicist.
- Pehr Henrik Nordgren, 64, Finnish composer, cancer.
- Mario Fernando Peña Angulo, 56, Peruvian congressman, lymphoma.
- Josef Tal, 97, Israeli composer, natural causes.
- John Thoday, 91, British geneticist.

=== 26 ===
- Pierre Colas, 32, German Mayanist scholar, assistant professor in anthropology at Vanderbilt University, shot.
- Bobby Cummings, 72, English footballer (Aberdeen, Newcastle United).
- Bob Mountford, 56, British footballer (Port Vale, Rochdale), cancer.
- Edgardo Vega Yunqué, 72, Puerto Rican novelist.
- Hazel Warp, 93, American stuntwoman (Gone with the Wind).
- Barbara Warren, 65, American triathlete, bicycle crash.

=== 27 ===
- Sally Abston, 74, American surgeon and scientist, kidney failure and hypertension.
- Alec Hill, 92, Australian military historian.
- Del Martin, 87, American gay rights activist, first legal same-sex marriage in California, complications from bone fracture.
- Isa Meireles, 76, Portuguese journalist and writer.
- Chittaranjan Mitra, 82, Indian scientist and administrator.
- Abie Nathan, 81, Israeli peace activist, founder of Voice of Peace radio station.
- Mark Priestley, 32, Australian actor (All Saints), suicide by jumping.
- Olavo Setúbal, 85, Brazilian politician and banker, mayor of São Paulo (1975–1979), heart failure.

=== 28 ===
- İlhan Berk, 89, Turkish poet.
- Harold Challenor, 86, British war hero (Operation Speedwell) and corrupt Metropolitan police officer.
- Phil Hill, 81, American racing driver, 1961 Formula One world champion, complications of Parkinson's disease.
- Ralph Kovel, 88, American antiques expert and author, complications of broken hip.
- Chidananda Saraswati, 91, Indian spiritual leader, president of the Divine Life Society.
- Sigurbjörn Einarsson, 97, Icelandic bishop of the Church of Iceland (1959–1981).
- Wonderful Smith, 97, American comedian, natural causes.
- Michel Vastel, 68, Canadian journalist and columnist, throat cancer.

=== 29 ===
- William Appling, 75, American conductor, pianist, educator and arranger.
- Bridget Cracroft-Eley, 74, British Lord-Lieutenant of Lincolnshire since 1995.
- Jayshree Gadkar, 66, Indian actress.
- David Lumsden, 75, Scottish heritage advocate and Garioch Pursuivant.
- Bela E. Kennedy, American politician, 90, Michigan state legislator.
- Geoffrey Perkins, 55, British comedy producer, writer and performer, head of comedy for BBC, road accident.
- Peter Snow, 81, British artist and theatre designer.

=== 30 ===
- K. K. Birla, 89, Indian industrialist and politician, after brief illness.
- Tommy Bolt, 92, American professional golfer, 1958 U.S. Open champion, liver failure.
- Robin Bullough, 78, British mathematical physicist.
- Brian Hambly, 71, Australian rugby league player.
- Killer Kowalski, 81, Canadian professional wrestler, heart attack.
- Eldon Rathburn, 92, Canadian composer, after brief illness.
- Gilberto Rincón Gallardo, 69, Mexican politician, presidential candidate.
- William Howard Wriggins, 90, American academic, ambassador to Sri Lanka and Maldives (1977–1979).

=== 31 ===
- Cynthia Ahearn, 55, American echinodermologist and museum specialist.
- Meir Avizohar, 84, Israeli politician and academic.
- Jean-Marie Berckmans, 54, Belgian writer, lung disease.
- Ken Campbell, 66, British actor (A Fish Called Wanda).
- Jamie Dolan, 39, British footballer (Motherwell F.C.), heart attack.
- Harmohinder Singh Gill, 75, Indian-born American scientist.
- Edwin O. Guthman, 89, American Pulitzer Prize–winning journalist, amyloidosis.
- Ike Pappas, 75, American CBS journalist, broadcast murder of Lee Harvey Oswald, heart failure.
- Victor Yates, 69, New Zealand rugby footballer.
- Magomed Yevloyev, 36, Ingush journalist and owner of the opposition news website Ingushetiya.ru, shot.
