= The Summit (2012 film) =

- Theatrical release poster
- Directed by: Nick Ryan
- Written by: Mark Monroe
- Produced by: Nick Ryan; John Battsek; John McDonnell; Darrell Kavanagh; Pat Falvey
- Cinematography: Robbie Ryan
- Edited by: Ben Stark
- Music by: Nick Seymour
- Production companies: Image Now Films; Pat Falvey Productions; Passion Pictures; Diamond Docs; Fantastic Films; BBC Films; RTÉ; Broadcasting Authority of Ireland; Irish Film Board
- Distributed by: Sundance Selects
- Release date: 12 December 2012 (London)
- Countries: Ireland; United Kingdom; United States
- Language: English

The Summit is a 2012 documentary film about the 2008 K2 disaster, directed by Nick Ryan. It combines documentary footage with dramatized recreations of the events of the K2 disaster, during which – on the way to and from the summit of one of the most dangerous mountains in the world – 11 climbers died during a short time span.

Reconstructions were filmed on the North face of the Eiger and on the Jungfraujoch glacier in Switzerland in March 2011. Pemba Gyalje Sherpa was present for the reconstructions along with Pasang Lama, Tshring Lama, and Chhiring Dorje Sherpa, all of whom were on K2 in August 2008 during the events. Footage from the various teams was used and includes Hoselito Bite, Ger McDonnell, Wilco van Rooijen, Cecilie Skog, Fredrik Sträng, and Alberto Zerain.

The film premiered at the 2012 London Film Festival.

== Reception ==
On the review aggregator website Rotten Tomatoes, 65% of 37 critics' reviews are positive, with an average rating of 6.2/10. Metacritic, which uses a weighted average, assigned the film a score of 63 out of 100 based on 17 critics, indicating "generally favorable reviews".

== Accolades ==
In 2013, the film was nominated for the Grand Jury Prize – Documentary and won Best Editing – World Cinema Documentary at the 2013 Sundance Film Festival. The film also won an IFTA award for Best Documentary at the 2014 Irish Film and Television Awards, as well as Best Feature-length Mountain Film at the 2013 Banff Mountain Film Festival.
