= Barchov =

Barchov may refer to places in the Czech Republic:

- Barchov (Hradec Králové District), a municipality and village
- Barchov (Pardubice District), a municipality and village
