= James Hoyt =

James Hoyt may refer to:

- James Hoyt (baseball) (born 1986), American baseball pitcher
- James Hoyt (footballer) (born 1990), Fijian winger
- James Hoyt (soldier) (1925–2008), American soldier, co-discoverer of the Buchenwald concentration camp
- James Henry Hoyt (1809–1873), Connecticut state senator

== See also ==
- James Hoyte (fl. 1980s–2010s), Fijian footballer
- James Holt (disambiguation)
