= 2008 K2 disaster =

Mountaineering expedition disaster on K2 in Pakistan

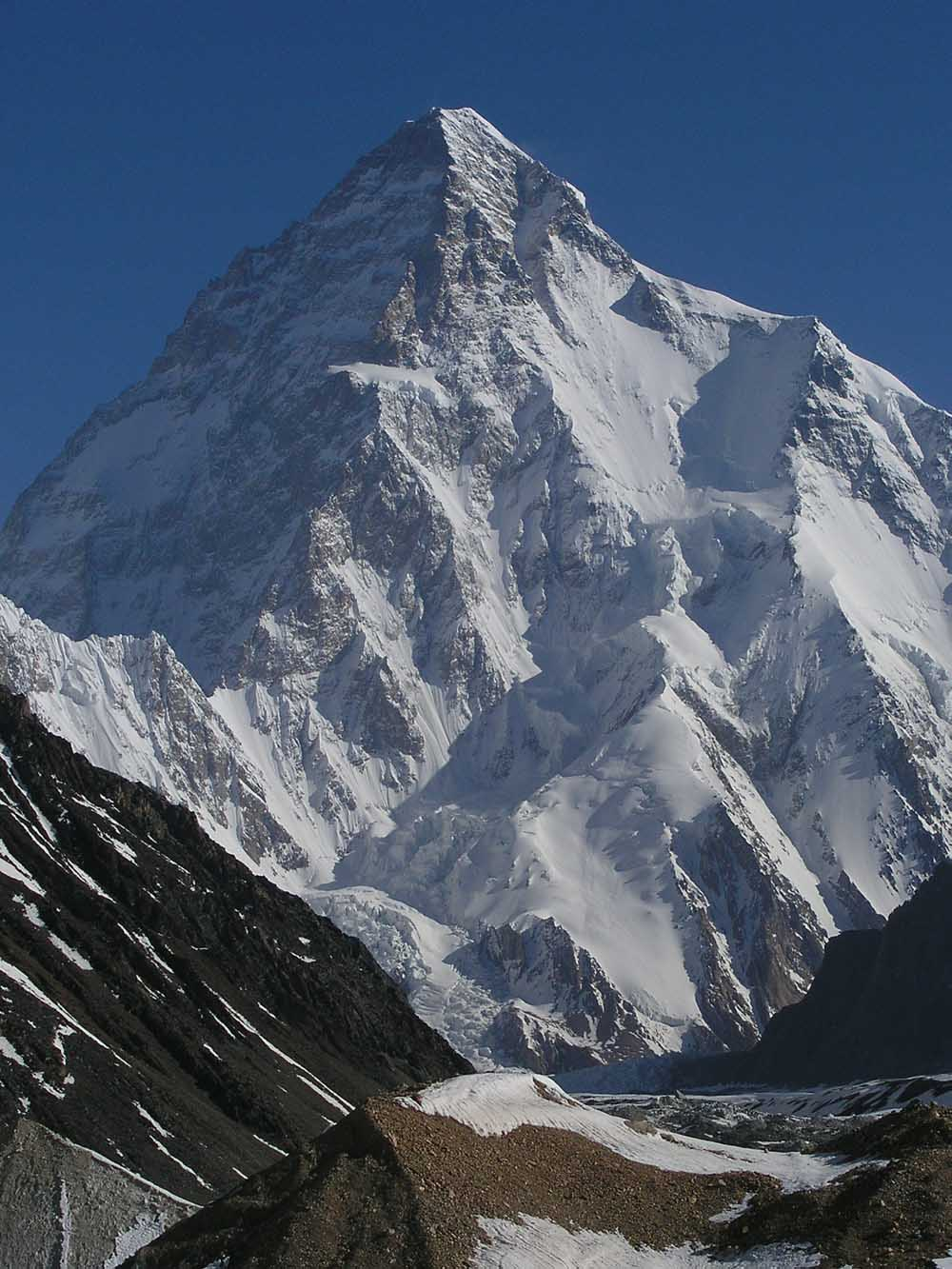
- K2 in Summer
- Date: 1 August 2008 – 2 August 2008
- Location: K2 Elevation 8,610 m (28,250 ft); 35.8825°N 76.5133°E
- Deaths: 11
- Injuries: 3

The 2008 K2 disaster occurred on 1 August 2008, when 11 mountaineers from international expeditions died on K2, the second-highest mountain on Earth. Three others were seriously injured. The series of deaths, over the course of the Friday ascent and Saturday descent, was the worst single episode in the history of K2 mountaineering. Some of the specific details remain uncertain, with different plausible scenarios having been given about different climbers' timing and actions, and different versions reported later via survivors' eyewitness accounts or via radio communications of climbers who died (sometimes minutes) later in the course of events on K2 that day.

The main problem was reported to be an ice avalanche which occurred at an area known as "the Bottleneck". This destroyed many of the climbers' rope lines leaving them unable to descend. However, two climbers died on the way up to the summit prior to the avalanche. Among the dead were climbers and support crew from France, Ireland, South Korea, Nepal, Norway, Pakistan, and Serbia.

== Expedition goal: K2 ==
K2 is the second-highest mountain on earth, after Mount Everest, with a peak elevation of 8,611 metres (28,251 ft). K2 is part of the Karakoram range, not far from the Himalayas, and is located on the border between the Pakistani Gilgit-Baltistan region, and China's Taxkorgan Tajik Autonomous County of Xinjiang Autonomous Region. It is regarded by mountaineers as far more challenging than Everest, and is statistically the third most dangerous mountain in the world in terms of fatality per summit.

The most dangerous section of the climb is the Bottleneck, a steep couloir overhung by seracs from the ice field east of the summit. The high risk of falling ice and avalanches means climbers aim to minimize time spent there.

The climbing season at K2 lasts from June to August, but in 2008 adverse weather prevented any groups from summiting during June and July. At the end of July, ten different groups were waiting for good weather, some of them having waited for almost two months. The months preceding the summit push were used for acclimatization and preparing for the camps higher on the mountain, the highest of them, Camp IV, at 7,800–7,900 m (25,600–25,900 ft) above sea level.

== Events between Camp IV and the summit ==
With July's end approaching and forecasts of improving weather, several groups arrived at Camp IV on 31 July in preparation to try the summit as soon as weather would permit. Members of an American team, a French team, a Norwegian team, a Serbian team, a South Korean team along with their Sherpas from Nepal, an international team sponsored by the Dutch company Norit, and the teams' Pakistani high-altitude porters (HAPs) decided to work together on the Friday 1 August ascent. A few independent climbers (a solo Spaniard and an Italian pair) also pushed for the summit in the morning.

=== Friday, 1 August ===
==== Initial delays ====
The HAPs and Sherpas started to prepare fixed lines before midnight. They were joined by Spanish solo climber Alberto Zerain, who climbed from Camp III during the night and decided to continue his summit push early, rather than stay at Camp IV. The most experienced HAP, Shaheen Baig, had to go back down with symptoms of altitude sickness. His experience as the only person in the collected teams to have previously summited K2, and his unofficial leadership of the HAPs and Sherpas, was sorely missed. Some confusion followed and ropes may have been left behind or placed too far down the slope from the Bottleneck.

When the climbing groups started upward at 3 a.m., they found that the HAPs and Sherpas had started planting lines right above Camp IV, where they were not needed, up into the Bottleneck, and then had run out of rope for the traverse just above the Bottleneck. This forced the climbers to take the rope from the lower portion of the route and use it to prepare the lines above the Bottleneck, causing a dangerous unplanned delay in the climb schedule.

At this point, Eric Meyer and Fredrik Sträng of the American group decided to abort and return to Camp IV, concerned about both the high probability of reaching the summit too late in the evening, and the high exposure to ice fall in the crowded Bottleneck. Chris Klinke pushed on for a few more hours before abandoning the ascent, as did Jelle Staleman of the Norit team, who was also suffering frozen feet.

==== Mandić and Baig fall ====
At 8 a.m., climbers were finally advancing through the Bottleneck. Dren Mandić from the Serbian team decided to unclip himself from the fixed rope to attend to his oxygen system and to pass Cecilie Skog of the Norwegian team. He lost his balance and fell, bumping into Skog. She was still clipped to the rope and was knocked off her feet. Mandić, however, fell over 100 m (328 feet) down the Bottleneck. Some climbers at Camp IV claimed they could see he was still moving after the fall and sent a group to help recover him. Swede Fredrik Sträng stated he took command of the recovery operation.

When Sträng reached the body, Serbian climbers Predrag Zagorac and Iso Planić, along with their HAP Mohammed Hussein, had already arrived. They had found no pulse and, judging by the severity of Mandić's injuries, pronounced him dead. The Serbian climbers decided to lower the body down to Camp IV, and Sträng assisted them. They were joined by Jehan Baig, a HAP from the French team, who had fulfilled his assisting duties and had been allowed to head down. Several people later indicated Baig may have been suffering from high altitude sickness, since he had displayed questionable behaviour in abseiling down the Bottleneck. Sträng also noticed that Baig was incoherent, first offering to help in the rescue, later refusing to help, then returning moments later to assist them again. Baig lost his footing and bumped into Sträng, who then urged him to let go of the rope attached to Mandić's harness, before all four climbers would be dragged down. Baig finally let go of the rope, but to Sträng's and the others' horror, he did not try to stop his own slide by using the self-arrest technique, which has about a 50% chance of arresting a fall, and fell to his death. It is unclear why he did not try to stop his slide. Sträng then decided to descend without Mandić's body. The Serbian group also aborted, wrapped Mandić's body in a flag and fastened him to the mountain, and started to descend. Nicholas Rice, a climber with the French team who had been delayed, also aborted at this point.

These delays, together with the traffic jam in the Bottleneck, resulted in most climbers reaching the summit much later than planned, some as late as 8 p.m., well outside the typical time for summiting of 3 to 5 p.m. Altogether, 18 people summited. On the descent, the Spaniard Alberto Zerain, who had topped out first and alone at 3 p.m., managed to pass through the Bottleneck without trouble.

==== First serac fall ====
By 8:30, darkness had enveloped K2. Members of the Norwegian group – including Lars Flatø Nessa and Skog, who had both summited two hours after Zerain – had almost navigated the traverse leading to the Bottleneck, when a serac broke off from above. As it fell, the ice cut all the fixed lines and fatally injured Skog's husband Rolf Bae, who had abandoned the ascent only 100 m (330 ft) below the summit, telling Nessa to look after his wife, as he waited for her to return. Nessa and Skog continued descending without the fixed lines, and managed to reach Camp IV during the night.

As a result of the serac's fall, the descent through the Bottleneck became more technical. Chunks of ice lay scattered around the route, and the mountaineers above were stranded in darkness in the death zone above 8,000 m (26,000 ft). Since the climbers had planned for the fixed lines, they were not carrying additional ropes or fall protection devices, forcing them to "free solo" the descent through the notorious Bottleneck. According to team Norit's Dutch mountaineer Wilco van Rooijen, panic broke out among the climbers waiting above the Bottleneck. Some tried to descend in the darkness, while others decided to bivouac and wait until morning before descending.

==== Midnight descents ====
The Norit team included a full climbing member named Pemba Gyalje, a Sherpa mountaineer who years earlier had been a support climber on Mount Everest. Gyalje descended in the darkness without fixed ropes to reach Camp IV before midnight. Sherpa Chhiring Dorje also descended the Bottleneck with "Little" Pasang Lama (who had been stranded without an ice axe) secured to his harness. "I can just about imagine how you might pull it off," writes Ed Viesturs in K2: Life and Death on the World's Most Dangerous Mountain. "You kick each foot in solid, plant the axe, then tell the other guy to kick with his own feet and punch holds with his hands. Don't move until he's secure. Still, if Pasang had come off [i.e., 'fallen'], he probably would have taken Chhiring with him. Talk about selfless!"

Two members of the South Korean expedition, Kim Jae-soo and Go Mi-Young, also managed to navigate the Bottleneck in the dark, although the latter had to be helped by two Sherpas from the Korean B team, Chhiring Bhote and "Big" Pasang Bhote, who were supposed to summit the next morning. The men had climbed up around midnight without food or oxygen, and found Go Mi-Young stranded somewhere in the Bottleneck, unsure of which route she had to take. They guided her down safely.

==== D'Aubarède's fall ====
Meanwhile, team Norit's Cas van de Gevel and the French team's Hugues D'Aubarède had each decided to manoeuvre the Bottleneck in the dark. As van de Gevel reached the bottom of the Bottleneck, he witnessed a climber falling to his death, a story corroborated by the two Sherpas Chhiring Bhote and "Big" Pasang Bhote, who also had witnessed one or two objects falling from the mountain. This climber was probably D'Aubarède, who van de Gevel had passed just above the Bottleneck in the dark. D'Aubarède had run out of bottled oxygen hours before, and when van de Gevel had passed him, he had looked tired and insisted van de Gevel descend before him.

Italian semi-soloist Marco Confortola and Norit teammates van Rooijen and Irishman Ger McDonnell bivouacked above the traverse, as they could not find the fixed ropes leading across the traverse. Confortola claimed that during the bivouac, he heard screams and saw a head torch disappear below him after a roaring sound came from the serac field. At that point, eight people were still above the Bottleneck.

=== Saturday, 2 August ===
The rescue efforts started in the base camp as a group was sent upwards with ropes to help those still stuck in the Bottleneck. The group included Sherpas Tsering Bhote and "Big" Pasang Bhote, who had previously helped Go Mi-Young down the Bottleneck; they now went to search for their relative Jumik Bhote, who had been stranded with the remaining climbers of the Korean expedition somewhere above the Bottleneck.

==== Second serac fall ====
Early in the morning, above the traverse, van Rooijen gave up the search for the fixed ropes and descended alone. His vision was deteriorating and he feared he was going snow blind, requiring him to get off the mountain quickly. Confortola and McDonnell did not immediately follow him. Later, van Rooijen reached the remaining Korean climbers (Confortola claims one of them was Kyeong-Hyo Park) and their guide Jumik Bhote.

The men were tangled in several ropes and had clearly been hanging there throughout the night, some upside down and bloodied, but all alive. It is unclear whether the men were the victims of a second serac fall, an avalanche, or perhaps a regular fall leaving them tangled in the ropes. Some sources mention only two Koreans and Jumik Bhote, while other reports indicate three remaining Koreans (one near death). It could be that this was the event Confortola had witnessed during the bivouac the previous night, while it could also be that this was the second object Tsering Bhote and "Big" Pasang Bhote saw falling off the mountain—there is little direct evidence to confirm either possibility. Van Rooijen handed Jumik Bhote his spare gloves but was unable to help them any more. He claims Jumik Bhote informed him a rescue mission was under way from Camp IV. Van Rooijen decided to continue descending.

Confortola and McDonnell reached the Korean group later in the morning and worked for several hours trying to free them. It is unclear what happened next. Confortola claims McDonnell, after working with Confortola for at least 1.5 hours, suddenly climbed back up the mountain, leaving him with the three stranded men. Confortola assumed McDonnell had succumbed to high-altitude sickness and was growing delusional, believing he had to climb back up. Left alone, Confortola did all he could for Jumik Bhote, giving him his own equipment. They had managed to get the Koreans back into at least a comfortable position, though they were still entangled. Confortola says he was able to radio Tsering Bhote and "Big" Pasang Bhote, who were on their way up to rescue the men. Confortola, having spent at least three hours with the entangled men, was exhausted and chose to continue down.

Van Rooijen disputes Confortola's version of the events. Van Rooijen, who had seen Confortola and McDonnell helping the stranded Koreans and their guide from below, thinks McDonnell did not climb back up the mountain, but rather climbed up to the highest anchor supporting the three stranded men to try to transfer the load. He then could have returned to the three men and may have spent another several hours alone helping free the men from the ropes. In his book Surviving K2, van Rooijen provides some photographs he believes support these claims.

==== Third serac fall and avalanche ====
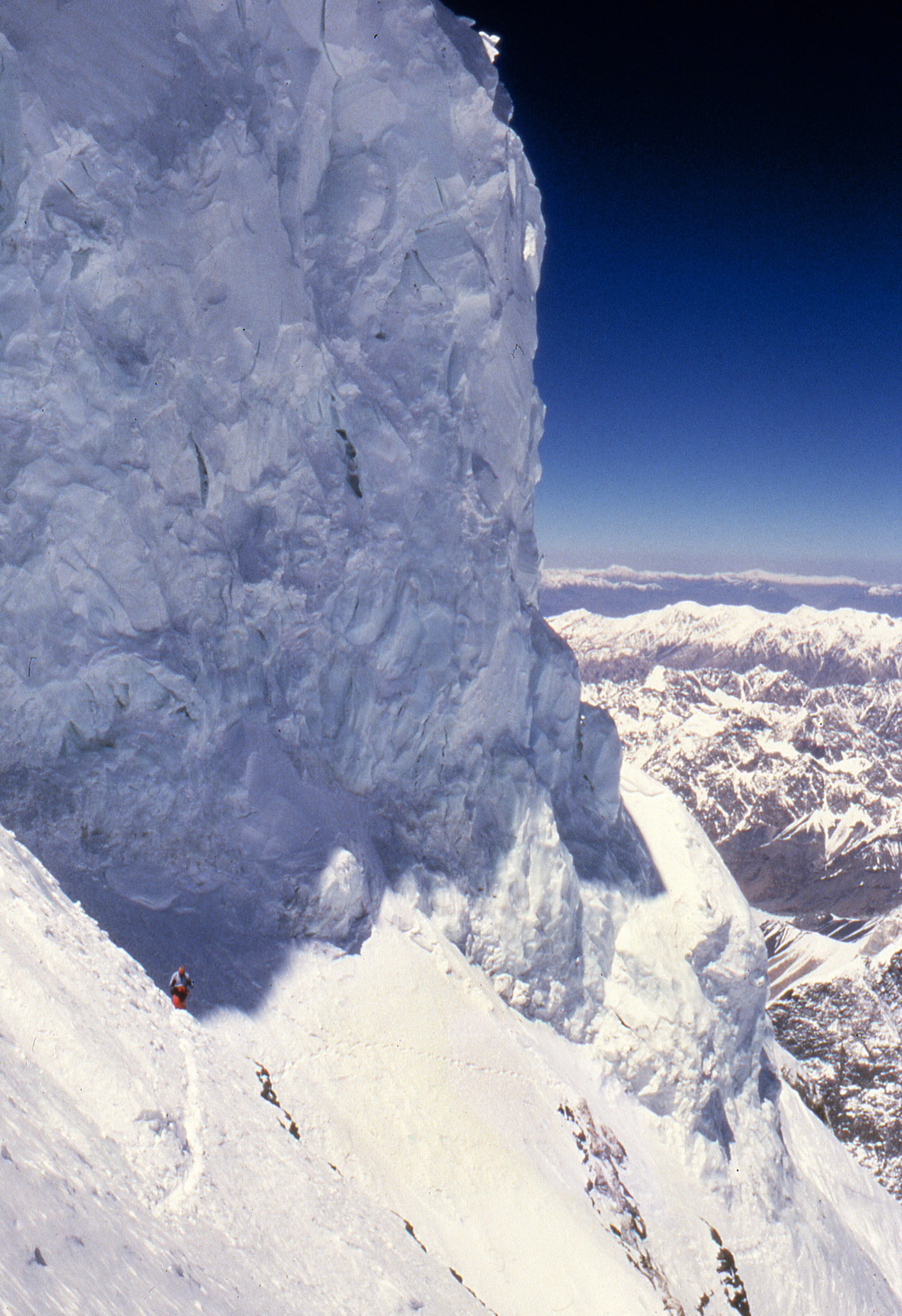
High on K2: Seracs above the Bottleneck

Confortola stated that some time after he left the three men, an avalanche struck just feet away from him. In the rubble of this avalanche, he spotted the remains of one climber. After investigating them, he concluded these were McDonnell's.

Just after noon, Tsering Bhote and "Big" Pasang Bhote had reached the bottom of the Bottleneck. There they found Confortola crawling on his hands and knees. The two Sherpas radioed Gyalje and van de Gevel to come up for Confortola, so Tsering Bhote and "Big" Pasang Bhote could continue the search for their relative Jumik Bhote and the Koreans. "Big" Pasang Bhote later radioed Gyalje that he had met Jumik Bhote and two members of the Korean expedition just above the Bottleneck—apparently they were freed after all. He also radioed that a fourth climber, descending behind the two Koreans and the two Sherpas, had been swept away by a serac fall and was dead. The description of the climber's red-and-black suit matched McDonnell's, which suggests Confortola was mistaken in identifying the remains in the avalanche as McDonnell's and supports van Rooijen's theory that McDonnell freed the two Koreans and Jumik Bhote, before being killed in a different serac fall. Tsering Bhote, from his position at the base of the Bottleneck, has also claimed to have seen a serac fall strike the rescue party as they were descending near the top of the Bottleneck.

==== Uncertainties ====
There was one other climber still unaccounted for: D'Aubarède's HAP, Meherban Karim. Karim was last seen returning from the summit with D'Aubarède, in the later hours of 1 August. He and D'Aubarède must have become separated in the dark, as van de Gevel encountered only D'Aubarède above the Bottleneck. Van Rooijen, in his book Surviving K2, supports the theory that Karim bivouacked even higher on the mountain than himself, Confortola, and McDonnell. Again, van Rooijen provides photographic evidence: what looks like a climber can be seen above the serac field on the morning of 2 August. In a later photo, the figure seems to have disappeared, and there is a trail leading down the seracs. Van Rooijen and others, including McDonnell's partner Annie Starkey, believe this figure was Karim. Disoriented from spending the night at such high altitudes without an oxygen mask, he might have become lost and stumbled onto the serac field, where he fell, or was swept away by an avalanche or part of the breaking serac. He might even have caused one of the serac falls. Hence, it may have been Karim's remains Confortola had found earlier in the avalanche rubble.

Graham Bowley (a New York Times Investigative reporter), in his book No Way Down (2010), is unable to refute the evidence presented by van Rooijen but still deems the photos inconclusive at best. He is joined in his analysis by writer Michael Kodas. Both men edge towards the testimony of the only living eyewitness: Marco Confortola. In the photos taken by Gyalje, individual climbers cannot be identified and some of the figures assumed to be climbers could be rocks, while marks that look like trails are everywhere on the mountain.

Confortola's statements were conflicting at best. Many of the things he said were later disproved. In his initial interview at Milan Airport, he stated that he had freed the Korean climbers. It was later determined that McDonnell had freed them. He may have also misidentified a body, later thought to be that of another climber, as McDonnell's. With regard to the previous night, Confortola stated that he and McDonnell saw climbers being swept away and decided to bivouac until morning. He said van Rooijen joined them later. Van Rooijen disputed this claim. He told McDonnell's family that they had all started together and bivouacked together. Overall, much of the truth of the story came down to van Rooijen's and Gyalje's versions of events. Part of the reason Confortola's version of events were believed early on was because he was first to speak to the media. Gyalje was still trekking out of the mountain range when Confortola was giving his statements and it was days before Gyalje could give his version of events.

Another possible explanation for the mystery is an error in "Big" Pasang Bhote's observations about the colour of the suit, meaning the last climber could have been Karim, who was wearing a pure red down suit. If so, Confortola had indeed identified McDonnell's remains in the avalanche earlier. The existence of multiple plausible scenarios underscores the uncertainty, even among eyewitnesses, pertaining to the course of events on K2 that day.

In the book Buried in the Sky (2012), Amanda Padoan and Peter Zuckerman examine closely the Sherpa and HAP experiences of the 2008 disaster, and present plausible alternative scenarios and explanations of the events, including the possibility that McDonnell and Karim were still alive at the time of the fourth serac fall.

==== Fourth serac fall and avalanche ====
Minutes after "Big" Pasang Bhote had radioed in the news that he had found his relative Jumik Bhote and two Koreans, another avalanche or serac fall struck. It swept away the four men. Tsering Bhote, who had climbed more slowly than fellow rescuer "Big" Pasang Bhote, had not yet reached the top of the Bottleneck. Consequently, he survived the avalanche, as did Gyalje and Confortola at the bottom of the Bottleneck. The death toll had now risen to 11.

==== Van Rooijen's descent ====
Meanwhile, van Rooijen was making his way down the mountain alone. He had climbed down a new route to the left of the Česen route, bypassing Camp IV. Van de Gevel and Gyalje descended from Camp IV to Camp III after they had heard van Rooijen was still somewhere on the mountain. Van Rooijen had managed several satellite phone calls that may have helped pinpoint his location. He would spend a second bivouac out on the mountain, suffering third-degree frostbite to his feet. Wilco van Rooijen is one of only a few people to survive two days above the 8000m death zone.

== Rescue operation ==
Van de Gevel and Gyalje made contact with van Rooijen on the Česen route early in the morning of 3 August 2008; the three managed to get down to the base camp at 10:00 p.m.

The Pakistani military started a rescue operation early on 4 August 2008, using two helicopters. They evacuated the two injured and frostbitten Dutch climbers from the base camp, located approximately 5,000 metres (16,400 ft) above sea level, to Skardu. Van Rooijen was found using GPS coordinates sent out by his Thuraya satellite phone when he used it to call his brother.

Confortola reached Camp II, the advance base camp and was evacuated by helicopter the following day. Pakistani authorities released a list of names of those killed and injured.

Four climbers, including an Italian, were making their own way down the mountain. The four were flown to Skardu for treatment.

== After K2 ==
- Marco Confortola authored a book in Italian, titled Days of Ice.
- Gerard McDonnell's family established a charity to sponsor the children of four HAPs who died on K2.
- Chhiring Dorje Sherpa and "Little" Pasang Lama's intersecting lives were profiled in Buried in the Sky (2012). The book won the National Outdoor Book Award (history/biography), the 2012 NCTE George Orwell Award, and the Banff Mountain Book Festival's Mountaineering History Award. Chhiring Dorje Sherpa was honoured for his heroism with the Tenzing Norgay Award at the Explorers Club Annual Banquet in March 2013.
- Pemba Gyalje Sherpa was named the 2008 National Geographic Adventure Adventurer of the Year, for "extreme heroism under trying extreme circumstances".
- Ed Viesturs published K2: Life and Death on the World's Most Dangerous Mountain (2009) and has participated in numerous other media projects related to the experience.
- Wilco van Rooijen authored a book in Dutch and English, titled Surviving K2.
- Cecilie Skog authored a book in Norwegian, titled Til Rolf

== List of fatalities ==
Name	Nationality	Location of death	Cause of death
Dren Mandić	Serbian	Below the Bottleneck	Fell during the ascent
Jehan Baig	Pakistani	Below the Bottleneck	Fell while trying to recover Dren Mandić's corpse
Rolf Bae	Norwegian	Bottleneck	The first serac fall
Hugues D'Aubarède	French	Above the Bottleneck	Fell in descent during the night
Karim Meherban	Pakistani	Above the Bottleneck	Either the second serac fall or the third serac fall
Gerard McDonnell	Irish	Above the Bottleneck	Hit by either the second or third serac fall, after helping the injured Koreans
Kyeong-Hyo Park	South Korean	Above the Bottleneck	The fourth serac fall
Hyo-Gyeong Kim	South Korean	Above the Bottleneck	The fourth serac fall
Dong-Jin Hwang	South Korean	Above the Bottleneck	The fourth serac fall
Jumik Bhote	Nepali	Above the Bottleneck	The fourth serac fall
Pasang Bhote	Nepali	Above the Bottleneck	The fourth serac fall

One of the three Koreans either died during the incident that caused their original fall and tangled the ropes, or the morning after before the others were freed. Some sources claim there were three Koreans tangled in the ropes, whilst McDonnell and Confortola were trying to rescue them. Others have the number at two Koreans and Jumik Bhote. What is certain is that only two Koreans were alive to encounter Pasang Bhote before the last serac fall.

== Climbing on K2 since the disaster ==
There were no summits in 2009 and 2010, during which the renowned skier Fredrik Ericsson fell to his death in the Bottleneck. K2's summit was not reached again until 23 August 2011, when Gerlinde Kaltenbrunner (Austria), Maxut Zhumayev and Vassiliy Pivtsov (Kazakhstan), and Darek Zaluski (Poland) topped out via the North Pillar.

== See also ==
- 1986 K2 disaster
- List of deaths on eight-thousanders
- List of mountaineering disasters by death toll
- The Summit (film), a 2012 documentary film about the disaster
- List of books about K2, including seven about the 2008 season

== Bibliography ==
- Bowley, Graham (2010). No way down : life and death on K2 (1st ed.). New York: HarperCollins. ISBN 978-0-06-183478-3.
- Curran, Jim (1995). K2: The Story of the Savage Mountain. Hodder & Stoughton. ISBN 978-0-340-66007-2.
- Falvey, Pat; Pemba, Gyalje Sherpa (2013). The Summit: How Triumph Turned To Tragedy on K2's Deadliest Days. Dublin: Beyond Endurance Publishing & The O'Brien Press. ISBN 978-1-84717-643-1. Archived from the original on 4 November 2016.
- Padoan, Amanda; Zuckerman, Peter (2012). Buried in the Sky: The Extraordinary Story of the Sherpa Climbers on K2's Deadliest Day. New York: WW Norton. ISBN 978-039-334-5414.
- Viesturs, Ed; Roberts, David (2009). K2: Life and Death on the World's Most Dangerous Mountain. New York: Broadway Books. ISBN 978-0-7679-3250-9. Archived from the original on 16 January 2014.
- Wilkinson, Freddie (2010). One Mountain Thousand Summits: The Untold Story of Tragedy and True Heroism on K2. New York: New America Library (NAL). ISBN 978-0451231192.
