= James Holt =

James or Jim Holt may refer to:

- James Holt (MP) (1647–1713), English MP for Lancashire
- James Maden Holt (1829–1911), English Conservative Party politician, MP for North East Lancashire 1868–1880
- Jim Holt (footballer) (1888-1951), English footballer, see List of Bury F.C. players (1–24 appearances)
- James Holt (American football) (born 1986), American gridiron player
- Jim Holt (philosopher), American philosopher, author and essayist
- James Holt (scholar), British Latter-day Saint scholar
- James Holt (historian) (1922–2014), British professor of mediaeval history
- James Richard Holt (1931–1991), British politician
- Jim Holt (actor) (born 1959), British/Australian actor
- Jim Holt (baseball) (1944–2019), American baseball player
- Jim Holt (Arkansas politician) (born 1965), Arkansas politician

== See also (similar names) ==
- James Holt Clanton (1827–1871), American soldier, lawyer, and legislator
- James Holt Marsh (1866–1928), British rugby union player
- Jim Holton (1951–1993), British soccer player
