= Rolf Bae =

Norwegian Arctic adventurer and mountaineer (1975–2008)

- Rolf Bae
- Born: 9 January 1975; Sandnes, Norway
- Died: 1 August 2008 (aged 33); K2, Karakoram, Pakistan
- Occupations: Adventurer, mountaineer
- Website: http://www.explorapoles.org

Rolf Bae (9 January 1975 – 1 August 2008) was a Norwegian Arctic adventurer and mountaineer. Bae operated an adventure company called Fram, specializing in Arctic and Antarctic travel and survival courses. He died during descent in the 2008 K2 disaster.

== Biography ==
In 2000/2001, Bae crossed Antarctica with fellow explorer Eirik Sønneland, completing what was then the world's longest ski journey, 3800 km long, taking 105 days to complete; the record was beaten by Rune Gjeldnes in 2006.

On 27 December 2005, he arrived at the South Pole, after skiing from the ice shelf, and on 24 April 2006, he reached the North Pole unsupported, both expeditions together with Cecilie Skog, the first woman to complete the Explorers Grand Slam.

In 2008, Bae together with Stein-Ivar Gravdal, Bjarte Bø and Sigurd Felde reached the top of Great Trango Tower (6286 m) in Karakoram, Pakistan, via the "Norwegian Buttress" (VII 5.10+ A4). The team spent 27 days ascending and 30 hours descending the peak. This was the second complete ascent via this route.

== Death ==
Rolf Bae died on 1 August 2008, in a climbing accident while taking part in an international expedition on K2 mountain in which eleven climbers lost their lives. His wife, experienced climber Cecilie Skog, reported seeing her husband swept off the mountain during an ice fall accident.

Bae was a friend and teammate of Ger McDonnell, the first Irishman to summit K2. Both men died within hours of each other in separate avalanches on K2.

== Personal life ==
He was married to Cecilie Skog. She has climbed the highest mountains of every continent (the Seven summits) in addition to reaching the South Pole in the first unassisted trek across Antarctica, and the North Pole.

== See also ==
- Meherban Karim
- Ger McDonnell
