= Harmohinder Singh Gill =

- Born: April 7, 1933
- Died: August 31, 2008 (aged 75)
- Scientific career
- Institutions: University of California, Riverside

Dr. Harmohinder Singh Gill (April 7, 1933 – August 31, 2008) was an American and Indian scientist, and served 35 years as a renowned plant pathologist and nematologist for the Riverside County Agricultural Commissioner's Office in the state of California under the direction of Robert M. Howie. George A. Zentmyer, professor and chairman in the plant pathology department at the University of California, Riverside, arranged for Gill to be appointed adjunct professor, with his own laboratory at the campus from 1968 to the early 1980s. Working with Zentmyer, Gill continued his work on elucidating the genus phytophthora by disc electrophoresis and serological techniques, which pioneered the fungi classifications in the field Plant Pathology. Gill taught his techniques to graduate students at the university and contributed articles in the Press Enterprise (a newspaper in Riverside County, California, USA) about various plant diseases. On February 4, 1993, the Press Enterprise published a feature article on Gill and his work on citrus-hungry aphids that caused the loss of citrus crops extending from Central America.

== Ancestry ==
Gill was a nephew to the 6th magistrate in the lineage of Rais Lehna Singh Majithia (General), who lived in the first turn of the 19th century and was the first General of Maharaja Ranjit Singh of Punjab, India. Because the Maharaja's family eventually terminated after the partition of India, the lineage of the General is the closest remaining royalty in Punjab, India. The castle of the General is still in existence in Sri Amritsar.

== Awards ==
In recognition of one of his last official duties for the County of Riverside in 1996, Gill received a Special Commendation and Appreciation from the United States Secretary of Agriculture for his identification and monitoring of Karnal bunt disease. This wheat malady devastated farmers in Blythe, CA that resulted in multimillion dollars of loss to the US economy. The State wrote, “The fact that these challenges were resolved and that the program achieved its stated objectives is testimony to the professionalism, knowledge, dedication and creativity exhibited by you and the entire Karnal bunt staff.” Gill retired on December 31, 1996.

== Education ==
As a youth, unlike his siblings, Gill went to boarding school in Punjab India and financially supported his family who resided on a farm.

In his adult years, Gill obtained his Bachelor of Science (B.Sc. in 1953) and Master of Science (M.Sc. in 1956) in Agriculture from Punjab University, India, passing in the First Division and as a gold medallist. He then worked in Tanzania, Africa as a plant pathologist for the African government.

Gill moved to Urbana-Champaign, Illinois in 1962. Here he obtained his Doctorate (Ph.D. in 1965) at the University of Illinois, Urbana, with the thesis title “Studies of the Differential in vitro of Physiologic races A-1, A-2, A-3 and A-4 of Phytophthora fragariae Hickman.” While at the Department of Plant Pathology, University of Illinois, Gill's article on “The Use of Polyacrylamide Gel Disc Electrophoresis Delimiting Three Species of Phytophthora” pioneered the classification of fungi, earning him a world-wide reputation in the field of Plant Pathology. Thereafter, Gill moved to Southern California and began his work for the County Agricultural Commissioner's Office (July 17, 1967) and the California Department Food and Agriculture.

== Family life ==
Harmohinder Singh Gill was of the Sikh faith born on April 7, 1933, in Ferozpur, Punjab, India, and raised in a small village in Sri Amritsar, Punjab, India, about five miles from the General's castle. He was the son of late Sadar Rajpal Singh Gill and Sardarni Sukhwant Kaur Gill. Gill was the eldest of five siblings (four brothers and one sister). One brother died at an early age.

Gill was married to Sardarni Avtar Kaur Gill, who is a first cousin to the family of Rais Lena Singh and with whom he had three children with: daughter (Sardarni Tajinder Kaur Gill), and two sons (Sardar Harindarpal Singh Gill and Sardar Harminder Singh Gill). Gill was quite proud that his children, born or raised and educated in the US, all received advanced degrees: Tajinder (Pharm. D., Clinical Pharmacy, USC), Harindarpal (Ph.D., Molecular Biology and Biochemistry, UCLA), and Harminder (M.S., Chemistry, UCD).
