= Alberto Zerain =

Spanish mountaineer (1961–2017)

Alberto Zerain Berasategi
- Born: 20 August 1961; Vitoria-Gasteiz, Alava, Spain
- Died: 24 June 2017 (aged 55); Nanga Parbat, Pakistan
- Occupation: Mountaineering

Alberto Zerain Berasategi (20 August 1961 – 24 June 2017) was a Spanish mountaineer. He is best known as a solo alpinist and the first person to summit K2 during the 2008 K2 disaster on 1 August. Zerain summited the mountain solo from Camp III and successfully descended before the series of events that led to the deaths of 11 climbers on 2 August 2008. In his mountaineering career, he climbed at least 7 eight-thousanders.

Alberto Zerain died on 24 June 2017 on Nanga Parbat with his climbing partner, Mariano Galván, while on an expedition.

== The 2008 K2 Disaster ==
During the 2008 K2 Disaster, Alberto Zerain was on a solo expedition. Zerain lacked the resources that other expeditions had. In order to secure a place on the mountain, he made a deal with a Sirdar (organizer of porters). He agreed to work as a porter to earn his keep. In return, he was given a site for his tent.

He worked hard side by side with native mountain workers. Over the course of the expedition, he earned the respect of the locals, who said they had never seen a westerner climb like a Sherpa.

While he met with other teams when they were planning the duty roster for fixed lines, he decided to climb alone straight from Camp III. He said he immediately noticed that other climbers were suffering from Summit Fever, and he chose to make the ascent alone while the others were still discussing their problem with fixed ropes. He summited K2 on 1 August 2008. He was the first climber to reach the summit that day. He also descended successfully and was the first climber to do so, only hours before the 2008 K2 disaster.

During that expedition, 11 climbers would die after a series of ice falls cut their fixed ropes, stranding them above the death zone. When he reached Base Camp, he was notified of the deaths that occurred behind him. Afterward, that climbing season became known for the 2008 K2 Disaster.

== Death ==
In the summer of 2017, Alberto Zerain was working on a project, spearheaded by Juanito Oiarzabal, who aimed to see 14 of the world's 8,000 m. peaks climbed twice. Part way through, Oiarzabal's health declined. Zerain then met up with Mariano Galván to finish the project. In June 2017, they were both attempting to summit Nanga Parbat via the Mazeno Ridge route.

On 24 June both climbers disappeared apparently in an avalanche that washed over the slope they were traversing. They are assumed to have been swept away by an avalanche, as a tracker worn by Zerain became stationary, 180 m (600 ft) below the ridge, until it ceased to function fifteen hours later. The tracker's emergency distress signal was never activated. A helicopter rescue mission manned by the Pakistan military found avalanche debris at the last location of the tracker. Zerain was 55 years old when he died.

== Expeditions ==
- Everest in 1993.
- Makalu in 1995.
- Everest's North Face in 2000.
- Ama Dablam and Lhotse in 2001.
- Gasherbrum I and Gasherbrum II in 2006.
- K2 (both faces) in 2008.
- Kangchenjunga in 2009,
- Everest in 2010, failed to summit via the Hornbein Couloir due to bad weather.
- Nanga Parbat in 2011, failed to summit via the Mazeno Wall due to an avalanche.
- Dhaulagiri in 2016.
- Manaslu in 2016.
- Annapurna in 2017.
- Nanga Parbat in 2017, Alberto would lose his life on this expedition due to an avalanche

== See also ==
- Meherban Karim
