= Peter Jackson (fashion designer) =

Australian fashion designer (1928–2008)

- Born: Herbert Peter Jackson; 27 January 1928; Melbourne, Victoria, Australia
- Died: 1 August 2008 (aged 80); Melbourne, Australia
- Occupation: Fashion outfitter

Peter Jackson (27 January 1928 – 1 August 2008) was an Australian men's fashion outfitter and fashion designer who catered to the Melbourne market.

Herbert Peter Jackson was brought up in South Yarra, Victoria, and became a hairdresser in 1950, and then a designer in 1953. He gradually transformed his family's mixed business into a specialist menswear shop, and later opened a number of branches. His early clients included celebrities such as Graham Kennedy, Bert Newton and Philip Brady. He introduced store credit cards to Australia. He was influenced by London's Carnaby Street, and he became a leader in the fashion stakes in Melbourne in the 1960s.

Despite early success, his business failed in 1976. He moved to Queensland with his two sons and became a house painter. Returning to Melbourne, he joined a clothing manufacturing business and dabbled in real estate. His siblings David and Olga revived the Peter Jackson business, with the new managing director, Paul Jackson (David Jackson's son). In 1993, Peter Jackson returned to the business and became the public face of advertisements.

The business took on sponsorship of the Western Bulldogs football club, as the CEO, Paul, is a passionate supporter of the team. Moreover, Paul's youngest son' Nick, is a passionate supporter of all things Australian rules football; and, as of 2011, Peter Jackson Melbourne is the namesake sponsor of the VFL.

Jackson died of prostate cancer at Knox Private Hospital in Wantirna, Melbourne, on 1 August 2008.
