= Barchov (Pardubice District) =

- Municipality
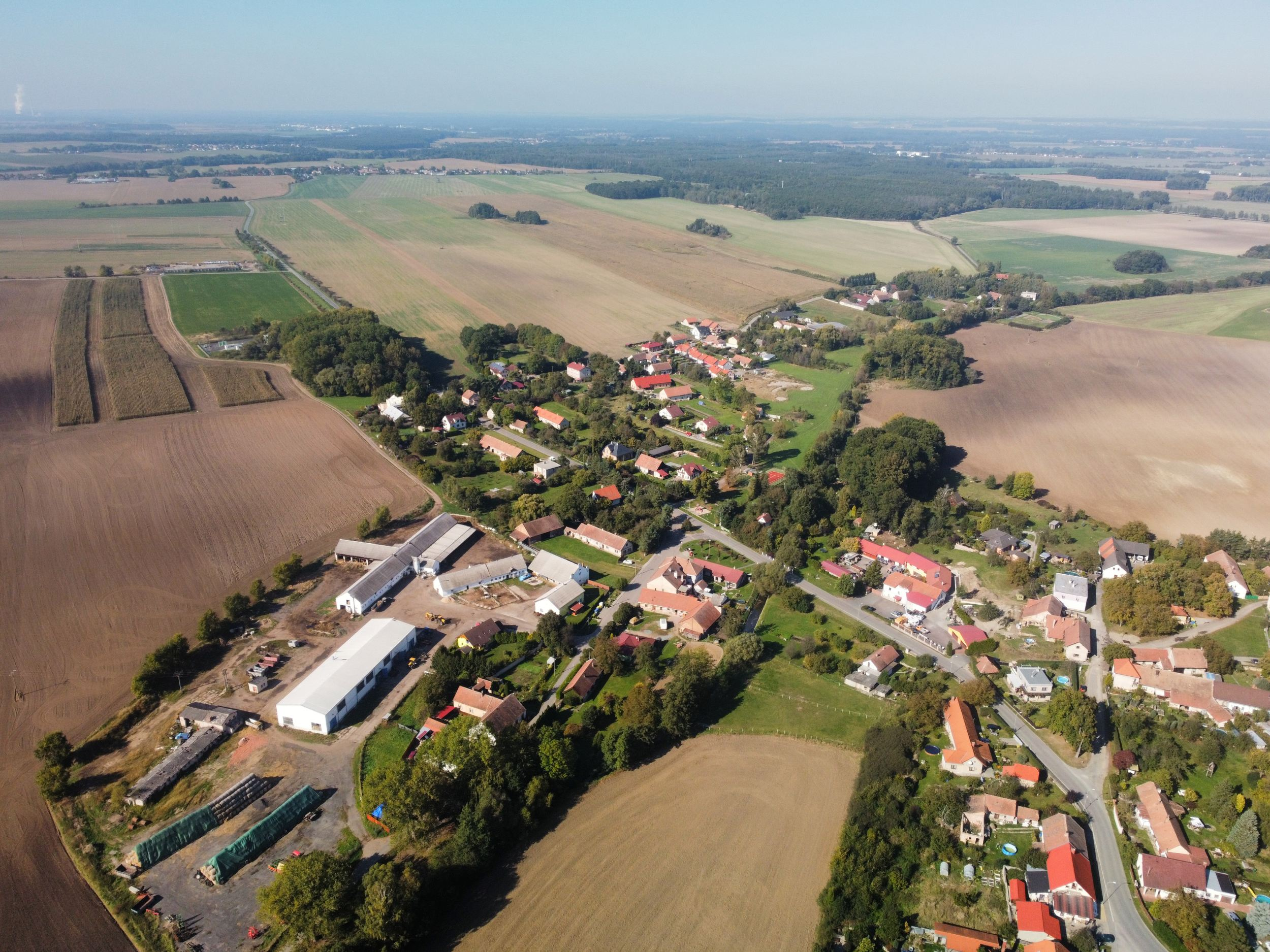
- Aerial view from the south

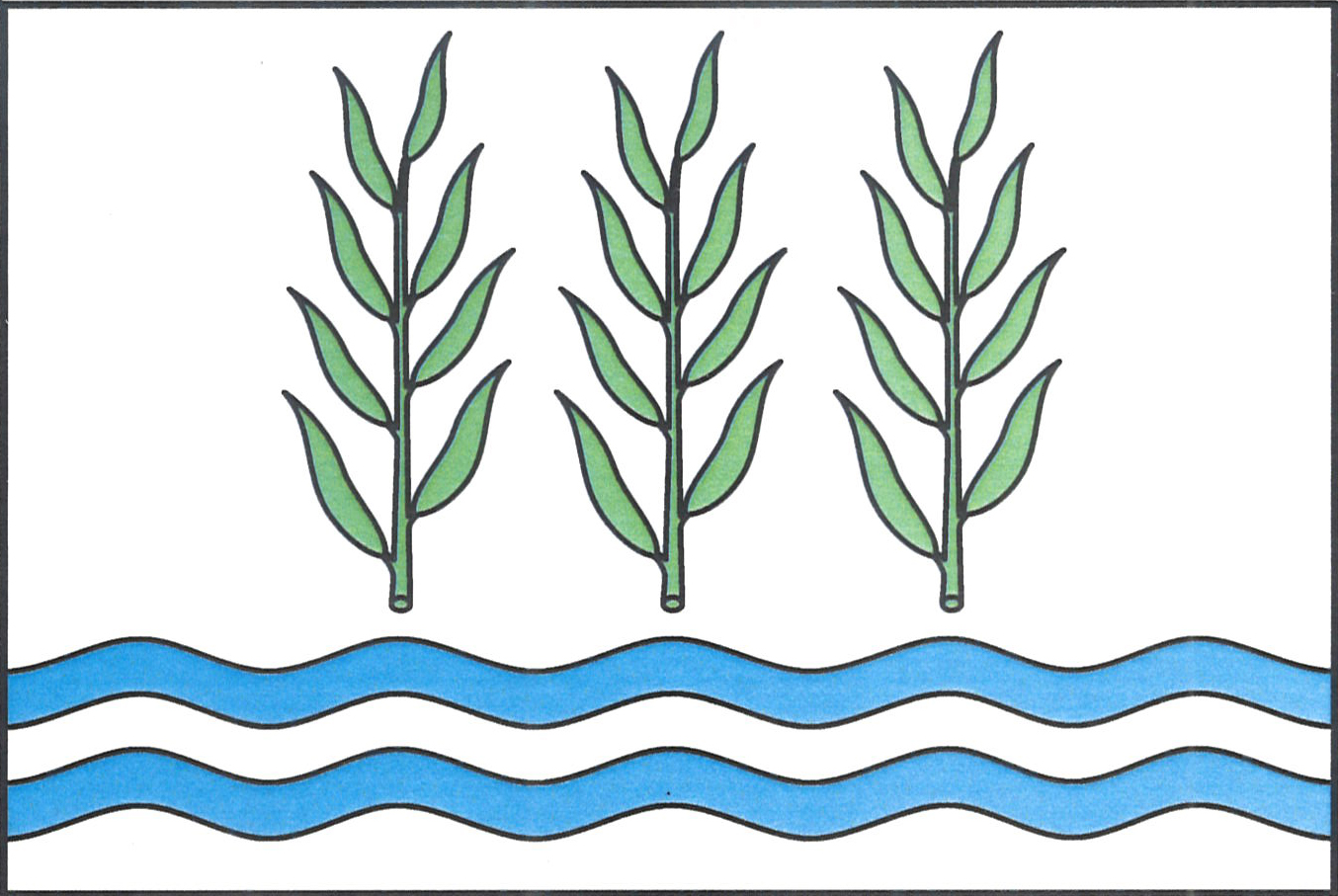
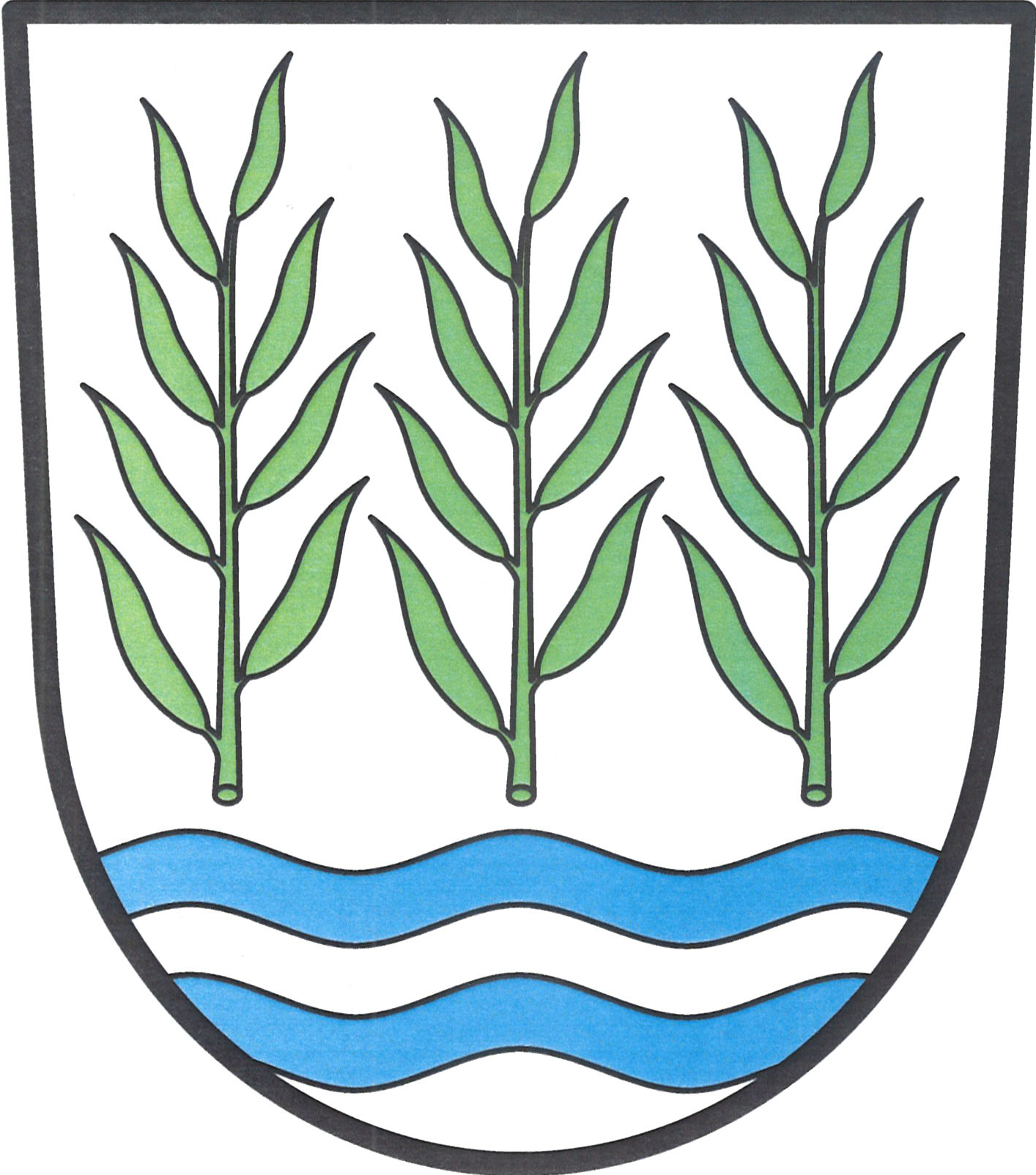
- Flag Coat of arms

- Location in the Czech Republic
- Coordinates: 49°59′58″N 15°40′51″E
- Country: Czech Republic
- Region: Pardubice
- District: Pardubice
- First mentioned: 1327

Area
  - Total: 4.42 km^{2} (1.71 sq mi)
- Elevation: 234 m (768 ft)

Population (2026-01-01)
  - Total: 338
  - Density: 76.5/km^{2} (198/sq mi)
- Time zone: UTC+1 (CET)
  - Summer (DST): UTC+2 (CEST)
- Postal code: 530 02
- Website: www.obecbarchov.cz

Barchov is a municipality and village in Pardubice District in the Pardubice Region of the Czech Republic. It has about 300 inhabitants.

== Demographics ==
Historical population
Year	Pop.	±%
1869	400	—
1880	470	+17.5%
1890	442	−6.0%
1900	423	−4.3%
1910	432	+2.1%
1921	430	−0.5%
1930	409	−4.9%
1950	270	−34.0%
1961	263	−2.6%
1970	208	−20.9%
1980	225	+8.2%
1991	146	−35.1%
2001	162	+11.0%
2011	186	+14.8%
2021	289	+55.4%
Source: Censuses
