= James Holt (scholar) =

British scholar

James Daniel Holt is Professor of Religion and Education at the University of Chester and is a British scholar of Latter-day Saint religion and history.

== Biography ==
Holt served as a missionary for the Church of Jesus Christ of Latter-day Saints (LDS Church) in the Scotland Edinburgh Mission (1991–93). During this time, his mission presidents were Joseph Fielding McConkie and Ian D. Swanney.

Returning from his mission, Holt completed a BA in theology and history at Chester College, then part of the University of Liverpool. On conclusion of those studies, he trained as a secondary school teacher in history and religious studies at Manchester Metropolitan University. Holt then taught religious studies in two Manchester schools for 12 years before taking up his current role at the University of Chester.

Holt has degrees from Manchester Metropolitan University, the University of Chester and the University of Birmingham. He published Religious Education in the Secondary School: An introduction to teaching, learning and the World Religions through Routledge in 2015. In this he outlines his approach to teaching RE. This includes a pedagogy he describes as a 'Kaleidoscopic' approach which draws on existing pedagogies of RE.

In March 2010, Holt was among the presenters at the BYU Studies 50th anniversary symposium.

His service in the LDS Church includes eleven years as bishop of the Hyde Ward, and service on the presidency of the Manchester England Stake from 2004 to 2011. Holt has also served on the National Public Affairs Committee for the church, and was Stake Director of Public Affairs in Manchester. He was also Director of Communications for the British Pageant of The Church of Jesus Christ of Latter-day Saints and also served on the Curriculum Writing Committee of the Church.

In addition to his professional and church responsibilities, Holt completed a PhD in Mormon theology at the University of Chester (the degree being awarded by the University of Liverpool). His PhD focused around an LDS theology of religions and its implications for interfaith dialogue. Arising out of this work he has presented papers at the BYU Studies symposium outlined earlier, and a Mormon Scholars in the Humanities conference at Southern Virginia University. Holt has also presented papers and written articles ranging from an exploration of Tolkien's religious imagery, aspects of Mormon theology to the teaching of religious education. He identifies these three strands as his major research interests.

Holt has served on the National Council of the Professional Council for Religious Education (now NATRE); delivered training courses on religious education around the United Kingdom. He is currently a Chair of Examiners for Religious Studies GCSE, International GCSE and A Level for one of the examination boards in England.

== Personal life ==
Holt and his wife Ruth, who married in 1995, are the parents of four children.

== Publications ==
Books

- Understanding Hinduism. A Guide for Teachers part of the Teaching Religions and Worldviews Series (Bloomsbury, 2024)
- Understanding Buddhism. A Guide for Teachers part of the Teaching Religions and Worldviews Series (Bloomsbury, 2023)
- Understanding Sikhism. A Guide for Teachers part of the Teaching Religions and Worldviews Series Bloomsbury, 2023
- Religious Education in the Secondary School: An Introduction to teaching, learning and the world religions Second Edition Routledge, 2022
- It’s not a Secret Teach, Share, Testify, 2021
- Gospel Lessons from my Heroes Teach, Share, Testify, 2021
- Hearing Him Teach, Share, Testify, 2020
- Towards a Latter-day Saint Theology of Religions KDP, 2020
- Beyond the Big Six: Expanding the Boundaries in the Teaching of Religion and Worldviews University of Chester Press, 2019
- Religious Education in the Secondary School: An Introduction to teaching, learning and the world religions Routledge, 2015

Chapters in Books

- “Religious Education” in Nasreen Majid (ed) Essential Subject Knowledge for Primary Teaching (Sage, 2023)
- “What knowledge, skills and understanding do beginning Religious Education teachers need?” in Helen Sheehan ed., A practical guide to mentoring beginning Religious Education (RE) teachers Routledge, 2022
- “The role of mentors in the development of beginning Religious Education teachers" in Helen Sheehan ed., A practical guide to mentoring beginning Religious Education (RE) teachers Routledge, 2022
- “Religious Education” in Deborah Pope ed., Understanding Subject Knowledge for Primary Teaching Learning Matters, 2019
- “‘There's only one God, ma'am’- one God or many gods in the world of the Avengers” in Nicolas Michaud ed., Iron Man vs Captain America and philosophy Open Court, 2018
- "Inclusion" in L. Philip Barnes ed., Learning to teach Religious Education in the Secondary School 3rd edition (Routledge, 2017)
- "The Church of Jesus Christ of Latter-day Saints" in Brian Gates, ed., Religion in National Systems of Education. Insider and outsider perspectives on Religious Education in England (Tubingen: Mohr Siebeck, 2017)
- "The Worth of a Soul: Alma and Abinadi" in Julie Smith, ed., Come, Let Us Reason Together: Dialogues with Scripture (Greg Kofford, 2016)
- "A Latter-day Saint reading of Tolkien" in The Return of the Ring: Proceedings of the Tolkien Society Conference 2012 Edited by Lynn Forest-Hill. 3,000 words (Luna Press, 2016)
- "Religion in the Ender’s Saga?" in D. Wikktower, ed., Ender’s Game and Philosophy, (Chicago: Open Court, 2013)
- "Faith based practice? The impact of a teacher’s beliefs on the classroom" in D. Morris, ed., Re-Imagining Christian Education for the 21st Century chapter 17 (Chelmsford: Matthew James, 2013).
- "Beyond the Big Six: Minority Religions in the Secondary RE Classroom" in Schmack et al., ed Engaging RE Cambridge Scholars, 2010

School Resources

- The Church of Jesus Christ of Latter-day Saints Outline of Beliefs for Educators: The Church of Jesus Christ of Latter-day Saints. (Salt Lake City, Intellectual Reserve, 2019)
- IGCSE Religious Studies: Christianity and Islam ICS, 2011
- Buddhism for Edexcel GCSE Teacher’s and Pupil Guide Pearson, 2010
- Muslims in Britain: A Scheme of Work and Teaching Resources Muslim Youth Foundation, 2009
- Key Stage 4 Islam Interactive Activities Boardworks, 2009
- With Gordon Reid and Sarah Tyler Religion and Life: Edexcel GCSE Religion and Life CD Rom, Pearson, 2009

Articles

- “The Implications of the 2021 Census for the RE Classroom” in RE Today (Summer 2023)
- “Vision. Inside a faith: a Latter-day Saint view” in RE Today 37:3 (Summer 2020) p.79 co-authored with Abigail Holt
- "A Latter-day Saint approach to addiction, its aetiology and treatment" in Religions (2015), 6, 1–13 http://www.mdpi.com/2077-1444/6/1/1
- "Teaching and a Teacher’s Faith and Beliefs" in REsource 35: 2 (Spring 2013) pp7–9
- 2012 "The Dichotomy of Latter-day Saint Interfaith Commentary" in BYU Studies
- "Interfaith Dialogue: A Way Forward in Setting Ground Rules" in Sacred Tribes Journal Volume 7 Number 1 (2012): 70-79
- 2011 "My Experience of Teaching Islam" in Muslim Youth Foundation Educational Supplement Issue 1 pp10–11
- 2007 "Guided imagination as a basis for understanding the importance of special places"
- "The Church of Jesus Christ of Latter-day Saints in the R.E. Classroom” in REsource. The Journal of the Professional Council of Religious Education Summer 2002
- "Jehovah’s Witnesses and the R.E. Classroom" in REsource. Spring 2004
- “The frontiers of Christianity” in RE Today 22:2 Spring 2005 p34
