= Isa Meireles =

Isa Meireles (c. 1932 – 27 August 2008) was a Portuguese journalist, reporter and writer. Meireles began her professional career at the Diário Ilustrado. She also worked at the Diário de Lisboa and O Século Ilustrado. During the latter part of her career, Meireles wrote for the now defunct Agência Noticiosa Portuguesa (ANOP) news agency, from which she retired in 1984.

Meireles also wrote several children's stories.

She died unexpectedly at her home in Lisbon on 27 August 2008, aged 76.
