= Mingli Sar =

Mountain in Pakistan

Minglik Sar منگلیگ سر

Highest point
- Elevation: 6,050 m (19,850 ft)
- Prominence: 440 m (1,440 ft)
- Coordinates: 36°28′41.73″N 75°41′43.17″E

Geography
- Location: Gilgit-Baltistan, Pakistan
- Parent range: Karakoram

Minglik Sar (Urdu: منگلی سر) is a mountain located in the Shimshal valley in Gilgit-Baltistan, Pakistan. The mountain, located in the Karakoram mountain range, is 6050 meters high and located at the southernmost part of the Pamir mountain range. It was first climbed in 1988 by the famous Pakistani climber Nazir Sabir. Shimshal lake sits at the base of the mountain. China is located to the north, while to the left is the Hindukush mountain range. K2 is located on the south eastern side of the valley.

Despite being climbed many times in the summer, it is a nearly impossible task in the months before June. The snow is deep and it requires extreme mountaineering, climbing and alpine experience. It has been attempted several times for winter ascents but none have been successful.

Summers are beautiful in the area and the base camp can be set close to the summit and several attempts can be made.

== Guinness World Records ==
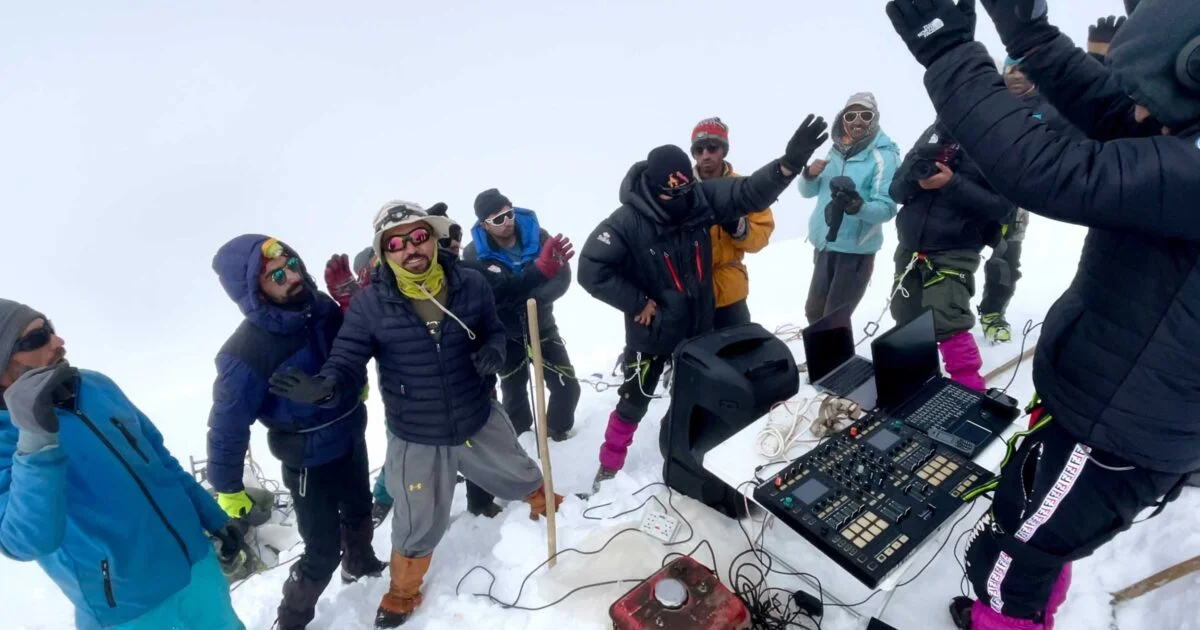
Photo from the world's highest dance party

The Guinness World Record for the world's highest altitude dance party and the world's highest altitude DJ set were performed on Miniglik Sar in July, 2021 at the height of 5,909 metres (19,386ft). This record was made by local musicians and mountaineers under the banner of Team Khimor, and was supported by HBL as a part of their CSR initiative. The team-members included Nosher Ali Khan Zapoo, DJ Ghasuray, Saad Ata Barcha, Zulqarnain Saleem, Ali Musa, Rameez Ahmed, Mohsin Kamal, Junaid Alam, Noman Asmet, and Misyab Khan (all hailing from Hunza, Pakistan).
