= Muriel Kallis Steinberg Newman =

American philanthropist

Muriel Kallis Steinberg Newman (February 25, 1914 – August 22, 2008) was an American philanthropist who donated her extensive collection of Abstract Expressionist art to the Metropolitan Museum of Art and the School of the Art Institute of Chicago.

== Life and career ==
She was born in Chicago, Illinois and as a youth took art classes at the School of the Art Institute of Chicago and at University of Chicago.

Her first husband, businessman Jay Z. Steinberg, died in 1954, and she then was married to businessman Albert Hardy Newman from 1955 until his death in 1988.

In the 1940s she began purchasing works by Abstract Expressionists, including Jackson Pollock, Willem de Kooning, Robert Motherwell, Mark Rothko, Franz Kline, and Alexander Calder. Though a lifelong Chicago resident, Newman bequeathed most of her collection to the Met in New York.

Newman died in Chicago of natural causes.
