= Cecilie Skog =

Norwegian adventurer (born 1974)

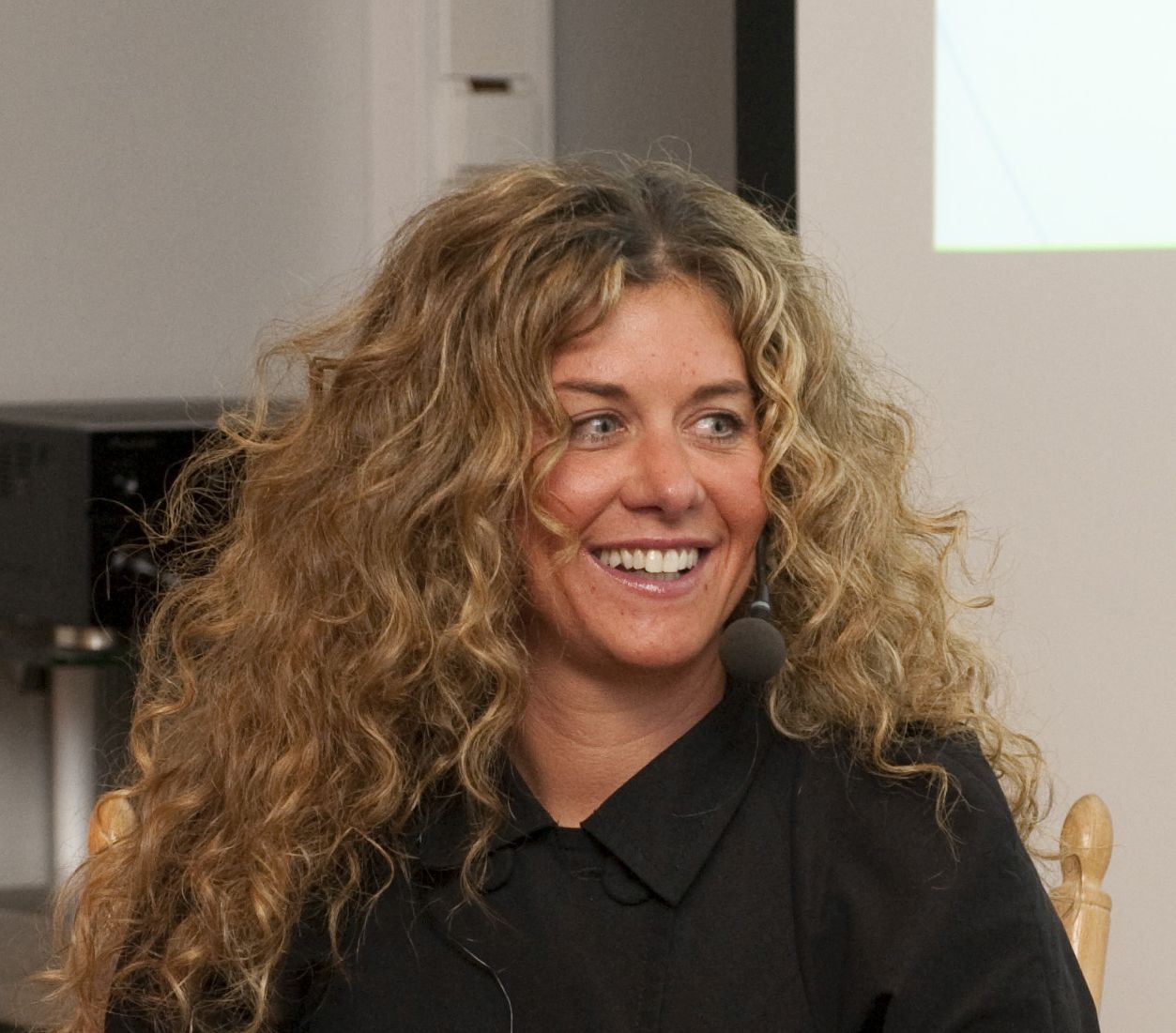
- Skog in 2011
- Born: 9 August 1974 (age 52); Ålesund, Norway
- Occupations: Adventurer, lecturer, guide
- Spouse(s): Rolf Bae (died 2008) Aleksander Gamme (m. 2014; div. 2019)

Cecilie Skog (born August 9, 1974) is a Norwegian adventurer who was the first Norwegian woman to summit the mountain K2 in 2008. In 2010, she made the first unassisted trek across Antarctica.

== Life ==
Skog studied and worked as a nurse, but since summiting Mount Everest in 2004, she has worked as a professional adventurer, guide and lecturer.

In August 2008, she climbed K2. Her husband, Rolf Bae, who had been climbing with her on K2, perished during the descent, as did ten other mountaineers. In a close call at the so-called Bottleneck, a Serbian climber, Dren Mandić, unhooked himself and lost balance, bumping into Skog and falling 100 metres to his death.

In January 2010, she finished the first unassisted and unsupported crossing of Antarctica. Together with Ryan Waters, she took 70 days, from November 13, 2009 to January 21, 2010, to complete the more than 1800 km long journey across the Antarctic continent.

== Summits ==
- Mont Blanc 4807 m, 1996
- Aconcagua, 6962 m (South America) 1999
- Denali, 6194 m (North America) 2001
- Cho Oyu 8188 m, 2003
- Elbrus, 5642 m (Europe) 2003
- Mount Everest, 8848 m (Asia) 2004
- Kilimanjaro, 5895 m (Africa) 2004
- Mount Vinson, 4897 m (Antarctica) 2006
- Mount Kosciuszko, 2228 m (Australia) 2006
- Carstensz Pyramid, 4884 m (Oceania), 2007
- K2, 8611 m (Pakistan) 2008, summited on August 1 with Lars Nessa. First Norwegians to summit K2.
- Manaslu 8163 m, 2011
- Lhotse 8516 m, 2012

== Other expeditions ==
- 2003: Shisha Pangma 8042 m (reached 7400 m)
- 2004: Greenland, crossed the inland ice east to west – 610 km
- 2005: K2 8611 m (reached 7300 m)
- 2005: South Pole, skied from Ross Ice Shelf to the pole in 32 days
- 2006: North Pole, skied from Ellesmere Island to the pole in 49 days
- 2009: Greenland, crossed the inland ice west to east – 590 km
- 2010: Crossed Antarctica, from Berkner Island via the South Pole to Ross Ice Shelf in 70 days and more than 1800 km
- 2011: Interrupted ski attempt (dragging a canoe) to North Pole during summertime

== Books ==
- Cecilie Skog og de tre polene (2006)
- Til Rolf (2009)
- Antarktis (2011)
- Utemat (2012)
- Et friluftsliv (2014)

== See also ==
- Explorers Grand Slam
- Three Poles Challenge
