= Pierre Colas =

German anthropologist (1976–2008)

Pierre Robert Colas
- Born: January 13, 1976; London, UK
- Died: August 26, 2008 (aged 32); Nashville, Tennessee USA
- Citizenship: German
- Education: • University of Hamburg (1999, MA) • Bonn and Cologne universities (2004, PhD)
- Known for: • study of Maya names and titles • ethnographic study of Belizean Maya communities • Maya cave archaeology
- Scientific career
- Fields: Mayanist scholar (archaeology, epigraphy, ethnography)
- Workplaces: Vanderbilt University (2006–08, assistant prof. in anthropology)
- Doctoral advisor: Nikolai Grube

Pierre Robert Colas (January 13, 1976 – August 26, 2008) was a German anthropologist, archaeologist and epigrapher. As a Mayanist scholar who investigated the pre-Columbian Maya civilization of ancient Mesoamerica, Colas was well known for his contributions to the study of the Maya writing system, and his archaeological work on cave sites used by the Maya. His analysis of onomastics—personal naming practices and titles of rank—in Classic-era Maya inscriptions was the first major publication of its kind. Colas also conducted ethnographic studies and surveys among contemporary Maya communities living in Belize. In Europe, he had close involvement with the organisation of academic conferences and workshops on the Maya, as a workshop tutor, presenter of original papers, and editor of several conference proceedings and reports.

Since 2006 Colas held a position as assistant professor in the Anthropology Department of the College of Arts and Science at Vanderbilt University, Nashville, Tennessee.

On the evening of August 26, 2008 Dr. Colas was shot dead in his Nashville home. He was 32 years old.

== Early life and studies ==
Colas was born 1976 in London, England. As the son of a German diplomat, he lived in several countries as a child, including a period spent in Mexico where he acquired his abiding interest and fascination with Maya civilization and culture. Colas and his family later resettled in Reinbek (a suburb of Hamburg), Germany where he completed his secondary education and abitur exams in 1995 at Sachsenwaldschule, Reinbek. He then enrolled at the University of Hamburg, graduating in 1999 with an M.A. in anthropology and Mesoamericanist studies.

Colas pursued doctorate studies in anthropology at Rheinische Friedrich-Wilhelms-Universität Bonn (University of Bonn), where his major studies focussed on the Classic-era Maya civilization and its writing system, the Maya script. He also undertook minor course studies in Egyptology and Latin American history at the University of Cologne. His doctoral dissertation was on the topic of Classical Maya personal names, rulership titles and glyphs, under the supervision of Prof. Dr. Nikolai Grube. This was the first major survey and analysis on the subject, and was published in book form by German academic publishers Verlag Anton Saurwein. Colas successfully defended his dissertation and was awarded a PhD in Anthropology the same year, in 2004.

== Career and research ==
While a doctoral student at Bonn, Colas was awarded two stipendary grants from the Studienstiftung des deutschen Volkes (the national academic foundation of Germany) to support his research. After obtaining his PhD Colas was awarded a research scholarship from the DFG (Deutsche Forschungsgemeinschaft, the largest research funding body in Europe), under its prestigious Emmy-Noether-Programme. In 2005 and 2006 Colas undertook fieldwork among the Yukatek-speaking Maya communities in and around San Antonio in Cayo District, Belize. This project, registered with the DFG as "Depolitisierte Ethnizität und subalterner Widerstand: Die yukatekischen Maya von San Antonio, Cayo District, Belize", involved ethnographic and sociolinguistic research among contemporary Maya communities, and continued on after he relocated to Nashville in 2006 to accept a position as assistant professor in anthropology at Vanderbilt University. While at Vanderbilt the focus of his ethnographic study of the Maya in Belize was an investigation of "the effects of globalization and Christian fundamentalism on the acquisition of the Yucatec Maya language in Belize".

== Death ==
On the evening of August 26, 2008, professor Colas was fatally shot at his home in East Nashville. His younger sister Marie Christine Colas who was visiting from Switzerland was also critically wounded in the same incident; she died later in hospital from her injuries. Nashville police reported they had arrested and then charged four suspects with homicide in relation to the shooting, three males and one female. A fifth suspect was being sought. Police advised that robbery appeared as the likely motive at that stage in the investigations, and although two of the suspects lived a couple of blocks away they were otherwise unknown to Colas. By early 2013, the murderer and several of his accomplices had been convicted to lifetime imprisonment.
