= Mario Fernando Peña Angulo =

Peruvian politician

Member of Congress
- In office 26 July 2006 – 25 August 2008
- Succeeded by: Jorge Foinquinos Mera
- Constituency: Loreto

Personal details
- Born: Mario Fernando Peña Angulo; 19 May 1952 Iquitos, Maynas, Peru
- Died: 25 August 2008 (aged 56) Lima, Peru
- Party: Popular Action; Centre Front
- Occupation: Politician

Mario Fernando Peña Angulo (19 May 1952 – 25 August 2008) was a Peruvian politician and a Congressman representing Loreto from 2006 until his death 2008. Peña belonged to the Centre Front and the Popular Action party. He has been replaced by Jorge Foinquinos.

== Biography ==
In 2001, President Valentín Paniagua designated him executive president of the Transitory Council of Regional Administration of Loreto (CTAR-Loreto). In the 2006 elections, he was elected congressman representing Loreto as a member of the Centre Front.

Member of various parliamentary commissions, it is recognized by the dedication of it especially in favor of bills by promoting the development of the Peruvian and Loreto, as well as in its control of the control of corruption.

== Death ==
He dies prematurely on 25 August 2008 at the age of 56, a victim of a painful cancer to the ganglia, with which he had for several months. The Regional Government of Loreto decreed regional duel throughout the territory of Loreto, and the Congress of the Republic raised the national flag at a duel signal.
