= George A. Zentmyer =

American plant physiologist

George A. Zentmyer Jr.
- Born: August 9, 1913; North Platte, Nebraska, US
- Died: February 8, 2003 (aged 89); Palo Alto, California, US
- Resting place: Olivewood Memorial Park, Riverside, California
- Education: A.B University of California, Los Angeles (1935): M.S in Plant Pathology, University of California, Berkeley (1936); Ph.D in Plant Pathology, University of California, Berkeley (1938)
- Occupation: Professor of Plant Pathology at University of California, Riverside
- Years active: 1962–1981
- Organizations: Sigma Xi: Phi Sigma; American Institute of Biological Sciences; Mycological Society of America; California Academy of Sciences
- Title: Professor Emeritus of Plant Pathology
- Board member of: The Explorers Club: UCR/California Museum of Photography; Friends of Mission Inn; UCR Friends of Botanic Gardens
- Spouse: Dorothy Anne Dudley
- Awards: American Phytopathological Society's Lifetime Achievement Award: UCR's Emeritus Faculty Award; UCLA's 1996 Professional Achievement Award

Signature
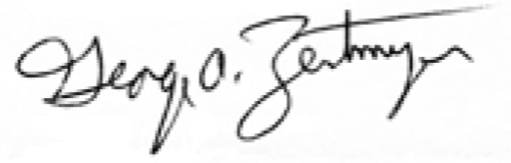

George Aubrey Zentmyer, Jr. (August 9, 1913 – February 8, 2003) was an American plant physiologist and professor emeritus at University of California, Riverside. He was known as one of the world's foremost authorities on Phytophthora.

== Early life ==
Zentmyer was born in North Platte, Nebraska to Mary Elizabeth Strahorn and George Aubrey Zentmyer, Sr. While an undergraduate at University of California, Los Angeles Zentmyer was a sportswriter for the Bruin. He went on to graduate work at University of California, Berkeley. Both Zentmyer's master's and doctoral theses discussed the cytospora attacking the Italian cypress.

== Career ==
Zentmyer started work in 1937 at the San Francisco office of the United States Department of Agriculture's Department of Forest Pathology where he studied the spread of White Pine Blister Rust across the Pacific Northwest. (Note: The USDA Division of Forest Pathology had been created in 1907 as part of what was then the Bureau of Plant Industry. The division was transferred in 1954 to the United States Forest Service.) In 1940 Zentmyer transferred to the Connecticut Agricultural Experiment Station where he worked on developing chelation and fungicidal chemotherapy to treat Dutch elm disease. The results of his experiments with hydroxyquinoline were published in Science in 1944. That same year Zentmyer was hired at the University of California Citrus Experiment Station to replace then-recently deceased William T. Horne. Zentmyer was one of the Station's first employees to specialize outside of citrus plants. He then began his career-long study of Phytophthora cinnamomi which had been ruining avocado crops across California at the time. After cinnamomi had been isolated in South Africa in 1942 Zentmyer was subsequently able to prove it was behind the plague harming avocado trees. Zentmyer began teaching plant physiology at University of California, Riverside. in 1962. In 1963 he and Donald C. Erwin were awarded a US$61,500 (equivalent to $646,753 in 2025) grant by the National Science Foundation to study "Physiology, Nutrition, and Morphology of the Reproductive and Growth Processes of the Genus Phytophthora." Zentmyer was recognized by University of California, Riverside as faculty research lecturer for the 1963–1964 school year.

Zentmyer was awarded a Guggenheim fellowship in 1965, during which he studied a pandemic sweeping eucalyptus trees in the Jarrah Forest in western Australia. In 1971 Zentmyer, along with Guggenheim fellow Peter H. Tsao and Donald Erwin, whom he had shared a National Science Foundation grant with years earlier, sought funding from the National Academy of Sciences for an international survey of Phytophthora they conducted across Africa and Latin America. From 1974 to 1975 Zentmyer was the President of the Pacific Division of the American Association for the Advancement of Science.

Zentmyer was elected to the National Academy of Sciences in 1979. From 1972 to 1994 he was an associate editor of the Annual Review of Phytopathology. In 1981 Zentmyer retired from teaching and was awarded the American Phytopathological Society's Award of Distinction after having been a longtime member and officer. That same year the California Avocado Society gave Zentmyer a "special award of merit", only the third in their 65-year history, to recognize his work to save the avocado. In 1983 he was a resident at the Rockefeller Foundation's Bellagio Center.

In 2013 an eponymous cultivar of Persea americana Mill was patented. The "Zentmyer" rootstock was isolated in 1993 and underwent inoculation and testing for resistance to root rot.

== Published works ==
- Zentmyer, GA (1942). "Toxin formation by Ceratostomella ulmi". Science. 95 (2472): 512–513. Bibcode:1942Sci....95..512Z. doi:10.1126/science.95.2472.512. PMID 17802486.
- "Mechanism of action of 8-hydroxyquinoline". Phytopathology. 33: 1121. 1943.
- Zentmyer, GA (1944). "Inhibition of metal catalysis as a fungistatic mechanism". Science. 100 (2596): 294–295. Bibcode:1944Sci...100..294Z. doi:10.1126/science.100.2596.294. PMID 17753084.
- "A laboratory method for testing soil fungicides, with Phytophthora cinnamomi as a test organism". Phytopathology. 45: 398–404. 1955.
- Zentmyer, G. A. (1961). "Chemotaxis of zoospores for root exudates". Science. 133 (3464): 1595–1596. Bibcode:1961Sci...133.1595Z. doi:10.1126/science.133.3464.1595. PMID 17781128. S2CID 23381075.
- "Biological control of Phytophthora root rot of avocado with alfalfa meal". Phytopathology. 53: 1383. 1963.
