= Bob Worthington =

Honorary Consul of the Cook Islands to the United States
- In office March 19, 1985 – 2008
- Succeeded by: Office closed

Personal details
- Born: January 31, 1936 Waikiki, Honolulu, Hawaii
- Died: August 14, 2008 (aged 72) Honolulu, Hawaii
- Spouse: Jean Rereao Karika Worthington

Robert Eugene Worthington (January 31, 1936 – August 14, 2008) was the U.S. former honorary consul of the Cook Islands to the United States. Worthington also served as the director of financial and scholarship services at his alma mater, the Kamehameha Schools, from 1974 until 2003.

Additionally, Worthington served on the executive board of the Polynesian Voyaging Society and helped to organize the historic Hokule'a voyage from Hawaii to Tahiti in 1975. He also worked behind the scenes at a large number of other important Hawaiian and Polynesian cultural, educational, athletic and political institutions including the Festival of Pacific Arts, the East-West Center, Prince Kuhio Hawaiian Civic Club and Gates Millennium Scholars Program.

== Biography ==
=== Early life ===
Bob Worthington was born in Laie on the island of Oahu on January 31, 1936. He attended the Kamehameha School for Boys boarding school, from which he graduated from in 1955. Worthington served as President of the student body during his senior year at Kamehameha.

He earned a scholarship to Occidental College in California where he received his bachelor's degree in political science.

Worthington moved to the Cook Islands, where he married his Cook Islander wife, Jean Rereao Karika Worthington. He and his family returned to Hawaii in 1974.

=== Career ===
Worthington was considered to be an advocate of closer cultural ties between Hawaii and other Polynesian island nations, especially the Cook Islands, French Polynesia and New Zealand. He also advocated for a renewed interest in Polynesian and Hawaiian culture, even before the beginning of the Hawaiian Renaissance during the 1970s.

Worthington became the director of financial services at the Kamehameha Schools in 1973. He remained in that position until his retirement in 2003. Under Worthington's guidance, the Kamehameha Schools established foreign exchange programs with Polynesian communities in the Cook Islands, New Zealand, American Samoa and French Polynesia. For example, he established links between the Kamehameha Schools and a Māori school in New Zealand. During Worthington's thirty year tenure as financial director, the Kamehameha Schools grew to administer over 15,500 scholastic awards totalling more than $25.4 million.

Worthington placed significant importance on the establishment of cultural, political, artistic and economic ties between Hawaii and other parts of the Pacific, particularly Polynesia. During the 1980s, Hawaiians artists were not invited to take part in the Festival of Pacific Arts because Hawaii was considered to be too closely associated only with the United States. Worthington worked behind the scenes to promote the inclusion of Hawaiians in the Festival of Pacific Arts and today Hawaii is a full participant in the event, which takes place every four years.

=== Honorary consul of the Cook Islands ===
Worthington was appointed the honorary consul of the Cook Islands to the United States in 1985. His position, which was based in Hawaii, was formally recognized by the United States Department of State on March 19, 1985. Worthington, in his capacity as honorary consul, helped to promote tourism in the Cook Islands, expand ties with the United States including Hawaii, secure and negotiate landing rights in Rarotonga, and expand the Cook Islander papaya industry. He served as honorary consul for more than twenty years.

In early 2008, the Foreign Minister of Cook Islands Wilkie Rasmussen announced the closure of the Cook Islands consulate office in Hawaii, which was held by Worthington, due to rising costs and expenses.

=== Death ===
Bob Worthington died in Honolulu, Hawaii, on August 14, 2008, at the age of 72. He was survived by his wife, Jean Rereao Karika Worthington; his five children - Teanaroa Paka Nakahili Worthington, Manavaroa Kamaki Worthington, Tapaarii Karika Ki'ilehua Worthington, Tevairangi Marae-Hino Pa'ahana Worthington Lopez and Moana Jean Karika Rule; and five grandchildren.

Worthington's funeral and memorial service was held at the Princess Bernice Pauahi Bishop Memorial Chapel at the Kamehameha Schools in Kapalama, Hawaii. Guests, which included former Cook Islands Prime Minister Geoffrey Henry, came from as far away as New Zealand, Australia, Tahiti and the rest of United States. Worthington's ashes were sprinkled from the Hokule'a into the Pacific Ocean off Waikiki.

A separate "spiritual ceremony" was held in honor of Worthington at the Taputapuatea marae on the island of Raiatea in French Polynesia. Worthington had been best known in French Polynesia for his part in the organization of the first Hawaii to Tahiti voyage of the Hokule'a Polynesian sailing canoe voyage in 1975 through the Polynesian Voyaging Society. Another memorial service was held for local Cook Islanders in Sinai Hall in the Cook Islands.

The former prime minister of the Cook Islands Geoffrey Henry, who attended Worthington's memorial service in Hawaii, spoke of his contributions to the Cook Islands, "Bob was always there, incessantly helpful, with iconic efficiency, grace and enthusiasm. He helped secure the support of the governor of Hawaii, allowing us to establish our first office in the United States."

Current Cook Islands prime minister Jim Marurai also issued a statement in reaction to Worthington's death, saying "Bob worked tirelessly for the Cook Islands, ensuring that we took full advantage of the close ties with Hawaii, especially in trade (maile leis), scholarships (University of Hawaii, East-West Center), training and various conferences and workshops."
