= Maxut Zhumayev =

Kazakhstani mountaineer

Maxut Zhumayev (born 23 December 1976) is a Kazakhstani mountaineer who climbed all 14 of the eight-thousander peaks (i.e. mountains above 8,000 metres), and without using supplemental oxygen. Zhumayev was the 26th person to achieve this feat in history, and the 12th person to do so without using supplemental oxygen. Later, he founded the Kazakh Alpine Club.
