= Ger McDonnell =

Irish mountaineer (1971–2008)

Gerard McDonnell
- Born: 20 January 1971; Kilcornan, County Limerick, Ireland
- Died: 2 August 2008 (aged 37); K2, Karakoram range, Gilgit-Baltistan, Pakistan
- Occupations: Mountaineer, engineer

Gerard McDonnell (20 January 1971 – 2 August 2008) was an Irish mountaineer and engineer. He was the first Irishman to reach the summit of K2, the second-highest mountain on Earth, in August 2008. He died along with 10 other mountaineers following an avalanche on the descent, in the deadliest accident in the history of K2 mountaineering.

== Biography ==
McDonnell was born in Kilcornan, County Limerick. A decade before his K2 success, he had moved to Anchorage, Alaska. He hoped not only to work there but also to develop his skills as a mountaineer. McDonnell was well known in Anchorage's Irish community. Among his interests was playing the bodhrán in a band. He was described as a "philosopher" and a "great storyteller". McDonnell summited Mount Everest with Mick Murphy in 2003. He was unsuccessful during an earlier attempt on K2 in 2006 when he was hit by a rock and airlifted to hospital. Irish President Mary McAleese was among the dignitaries to pay tribute to him in 2003 upon his successful Everest climb and again in 2008 following his death.

== K2 ==
McDonnell's group had been on a mammoth expedition for eight weeks, surviving in sub-zero temperatures. In an online despatch, he said that after the team set 31 July as their date for the summit bid, spirits were high. "Let luck and good fortune prevail, fingers crossed," he wrote. On 1 August, about twenty-four individuals were at Camp 4, the last camp on the mountain prior to the summit. Confusion at the camp was apparent with climbers claiming after the disaster that a team leader did not set fixed rope lines as others believed he agreed to do so.

Following an avalanche, a serac fell, cutting all the fixed lines on his and his fellow members of the Dutch-led Norit K2 Expedition's path. At least seventeen climbers were believed to be trapped by the serac, causing them to be stuck on the mountain overnight. It was said by the surviving members of McDonnell's team that he refused to descend because he was helping the others that were injured.

Ger McDonnell's satellite phone was given to Pemba Gyalje, a Nepalese Sherpa on the summit and he brought it along with McDonnell's camera back to base camp. McDonnell's partner, brother and sister flew to Islamabad in search of information about his condition. Whilst McDonnell's body was not recovered, a memorial service was held in Kilcornan on 17 August 2008.

== Investigation ==
Expedition leader Wilco van Rooijen, a 40-year-old Dutch climber who was airlifted to a military hospital in Pakistan after surviving the accident, said that poor preparations had contributed to the disaster. He suggested that advance climbers laid ropes in the wrong places on the mountain, hampering the climb of several teams of mountaineers and ultimately contributing to deaths of three of the climbers on his team. "Everything was going well to camp four, and on summit attempt, everything went wrong," said van Rooijen from his hospital bed in the Northern Pakistani town of Skardu. "The biggest mistake we made was that we tried to make agreements. Everybody had his own responsibility and then some people did not do what they promised. With such stupid things, lives are endangered." He singled out another team for only bringing half the length of rope they were supposed to.

== Memorial ==
McDonnell's mother, brother, partner, van Rooijen and Pat Falvey later appeared on The Late Late Show on 3 October 2008. In 2009, a memorial fund was set up in his honour to provide first-aid training and safe climbing technique for high-altitude porters.

Jason Black, from Letterkenny, County Donegal, reached the summit of K2 in July 2018, after attempting the climb on the tenth anniversary of McDonnell's death as a memorial to him. Earlier in the month Black had placed a memorial plaque at the K2 base camp, and carried a piece of climbing gear previously owned by McDonnell during his ascent that had been gifted to him by McDonnell’s mother. That same year, the first anniversary bicycle event in which cyclists travelled from Doolin in Clare to Kilcornan was held.

== Depiction in media ==
In 2012, McDonnell's brother-in-law Damien O'Brien wrote a book about McDonnell, "The Time Has Come: Ger McDonnell – His Life & Death on K2", published by The Collins Press. The book was launched in McDonnell's hometown of Kilcornan, County Limerick, on Friday 30 March with most of the town in attendance. Mike Barry, the first Irish person to walk to the South Pole, officially launched the book while others in attendance included Clare O'Leary, Wilco van Rooijen, Cas van de Gevel and Maarten van Eck.

A documentary released in 2013 by Nick Ryan, entitled The Summit, highlighted McDonnell's death and the overarching disaster in which he was killed. A book with the same title, The Summit: How Triumph Turned to Tragedy on K2's Deadliest Days was written and released by Sherpa guide Pemba Gyalje and fellow mountaineer Pat Falvey.

== See also ==
- Meherban Karim
- Rolf Bae
