= Victor McCaffery =

Australian cricketer

Personal information
- Born: 11 August 1918; Goulburn, New South Wales, Australia
- Died: 4 August 2008 (aged 89); Green Point, New South Wales, Australia
- Source: ESPNcricinfo, 7 January 2017

Victor McCaffery (11 August 1918 – 4 August 2008) was an Australian cricketer. He played five first-class matches for New South Wales in 1938/39.

== See also ==
- List of New South Wales representative cricketers
