= Vilma Jamnická =

Slovak actress and astrologer

Vilma Jamnická (née Vilma Březinová; 13 November 1906 – 12 August 2008) was a Slovak actress, astrologer and astrological writer.

== Life ==
Jamnická was born in 1906 in Barchov, Bohemia, Austria-Hungary (now in the Czech Republic). She died in Bratislava, Slovakia, on 12 August 2008, at the age of 101.

== Filmography ==
- 1954 – Drevená dedina
- 1958 – V hodine dvanástej
- 1962/1963 – Jánošík I-II (blind old woman)
- 1971 – Keby som mal pušku (Marina)
- 1971 – Páni sa zabávajú (Deminová)
- 1974 – Kto odchádza v daždi (Križanová)
- 1977 – Biela stužka v tvojich vlasoch (Kucková)
- 1979 – Kamarátky (old woman)
- 1979 – Postav dom, zasaď strom (old woman Haňa)
- 1984 – Na druhom brehu sloboda (Kocianka)
- 1985 – Fontána pre Zuzanu (Cilka)
- 1985 – Kára plná bolesti (Kráľovná)
- 1987 – Hody (Magduša)
- 1987 – Vojna volov
- 1987 – Strašidla z vikýře (Koutná)
- 1988 – Vlakári (babka)
- 1992 – Lepšie byť bohatý a zdravý ako chudobný a chorý (Margita)
- 1994 – Díky za každé nové ráno (Slavková)
- 1997 – Nejasná zpráva o konci světa (old woman)
- 2007 – Ordinácia v ružovej záhrade

== Books written and titled in Slovak ==
- Letá a zimy s Jánom Jamnickým (1980)
- Sny a videnia (2001), ISBN 80-551-0181-7
- with Marika Studeničová: Elixír môjho života (2005), ISBN 80-551-1094-8
- with Marika Studeničová: Muž môjho života (2007), ISBN 978-80-551-1636-5
