= Helge Uuetoa =

Estonian painter

Helge Uuetoa (16 April 1936 – 16 August 2008) was an Estonian painter, illustrator, and stage and film set designer.

== Career ==
Helge Uuetoa graduated from the Estonian State Art Institute (now, the Estonian Academy of Arts) in 1960. Afterward, she worked as a stage designer at the Estonian Drama Theatre in Tallinn from 1971 until 1977, and at the Rakvere Theatre and Eesti Televisioon from 1973 until 1988.

== Death ==
On 16 August 2008, police were called to Uuetoa's apartment in Tallinn where they found her beaten to death. She was 72. Police subsequently arrested her son Mart (her only child), and he was charged with her murder. She was buried at the Metsakalmistu cemetery in Tallinn.
