= Barchov (Hradec Králové District) =

- Municipality
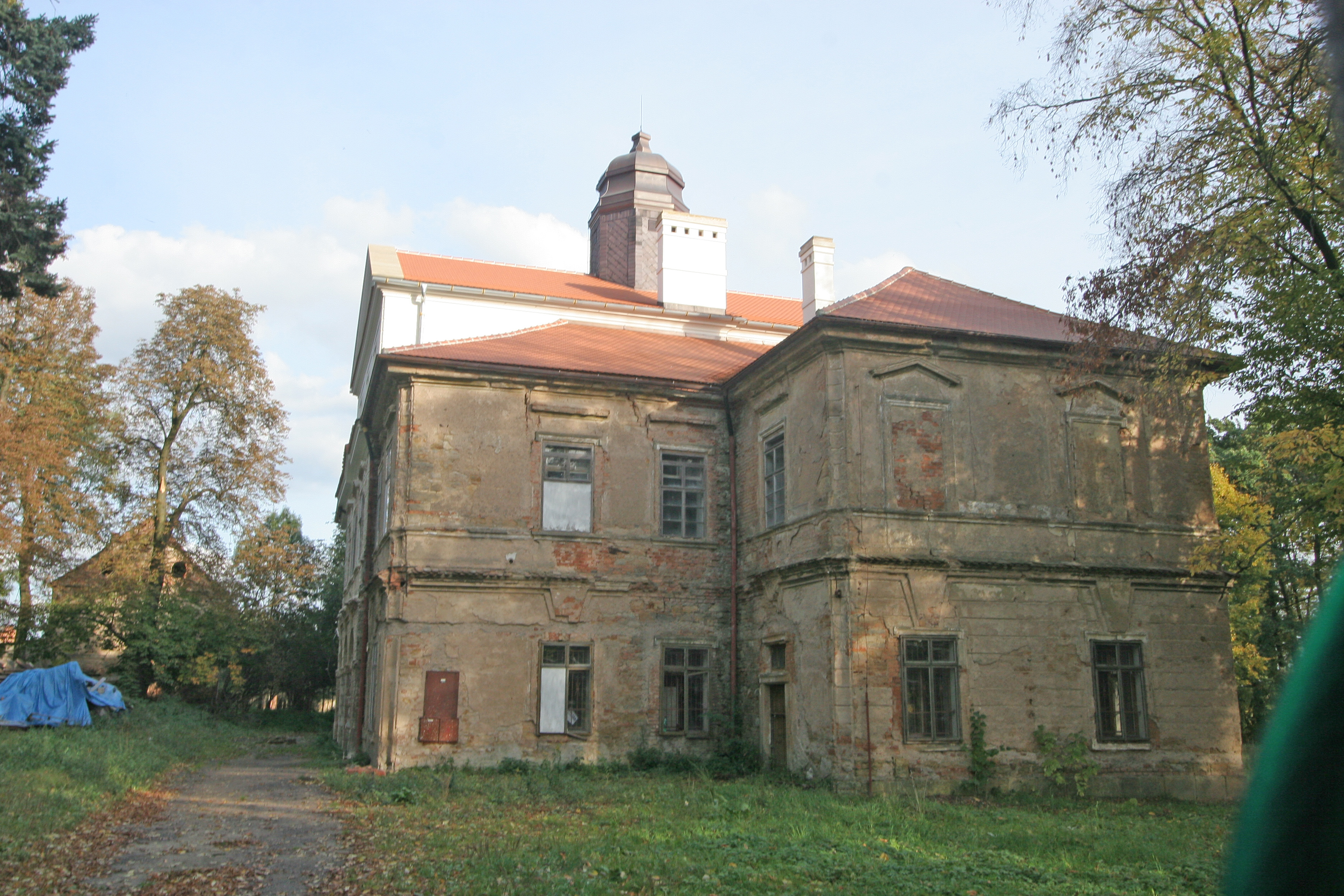
- Barchov Castle

- Flag Coat of arms

- Location in the Czech Republic
- Coordinates: 50°11′52″N 15°34′4″E
- Country: Czech Republic
- Region: Hradec Králové
- District: Hradec Králové
- First mentioned: 1398

Area
  - Total: 5.93 km^{2} (2.29 sq mi)
- Elevation: 238 m (781 ft)

Population (2026-01-01)
  - Total: 289
  - Density: 48.7/km^{2} (126/sq mi)
- Time zone: UTC+1 (CET)
  - Summer (DST): UTC+2 (CEST)
- Postal code: 504 01
- Website: www.barchov.cz

Barchov is a municipality and village in Hradec Králové District in the Hradec Králové Region of the Czech Republic. It has about 300 inhabitants.

== Demographics ==
Historical population
Year	Pop.	±%
1869	520	—
1880	538	+3.5%
1890	504	−6.3%
1900	490	−2.8%
1910	425	−13.3%
1921	422	−0.7%
1930	391	−7.3%
1950	296	−24.3%
1961	281	−5.1%
1970	267	−5.0%
1980	258	−3.4%
1991	277	+7.4%
2001	257	−7.2%
2011	289	+12.5%
2021	272	−5.9%
Source: Censuses

== Notable people ==
- Vilma Jamnická (1906–2008), Slovak actress
