= Hazel Warp =

American stuntwoman

Hazel Warp (November 11, 1914 – August 26, 2008) was an American stuntwoman. She was Vivien Leigh's stunt double in Gone with the Wind. Warp rode and trained horses in the film, was Leigh's stand-in in all of her horseback-riding scenes. She also tumbled down the stairs in the famous scene near the end of the film where Scarlett O'Hara loses her balance and falls. Other films she appeared in included Wuthering Heights, Ben-Hur and National Velvet. She was born in Harlowton, Montana and was twice married. She died August 26, 2008, in Livingston Memorial Hospital, Montana aged 93.
