= Robert Montgomery (lawyer) =

Robert Morel Montgomery Jr. (June 9, 1930 – 3 August 2008) was an American lawyer known for winning huge settlements, including State of Florida v. American Tobacco Co., et al., where the tobacco industry agreed to pay $11.3 billion to recover Medicaid expenses for smoking-related diseases.

Montgomery was born in Birmingham, Alabama, where his father was a criminal defense lawyer. He graduated from University of Alabama, becoming a member of the Sigma Chi fraternity, then spent two years in the United States Army. He earned his law degree from University of Florida Law School under the G.I. Bill.

After representing insurance companies, he switched to litigating on behalf of plaintiffs, frequently taking high-profile cases. When Kimberly Bergalis contracted AIDS from her dentist, Montgomery won an undisclosed settlement. He won an estate settlement of $10.5 million a year for Kathleen DuRoss Ford, third wife of Henry Ford II. He represented Burt Reynolds in his divorce from Loni Anderson. Though a Democrat, Montgomery represented longtime friend Theresa LePore, whose "butterfly ballot" design in Palm Beach County came under fire during the 2000 United States presidential election.

He died at the Mayo Clinic in Rochester, Minnesota.
