= James Hoyt (soldier) =

American Army soldier (1925–2008)

- Born: May 16, 1925; Oxford, Iowa, U.S.
- Died: August 11, 2008 (aged 83); Oxford, Iowa, U.S.
- Spouse: Doris Hoyt

James Francis Hoyt (May 16, 1925 – August 11, 2008) was one of the four American soldiers who discovered the Buchenwald concentration camp. According to military records, Hoyt, then a private first class, was part of a group of four members of the 6th Armored Division, who were the first Americans to discover Buchenwald on April 11, 1945.
