= Fredrik Sträng =

Swedish mountaineer

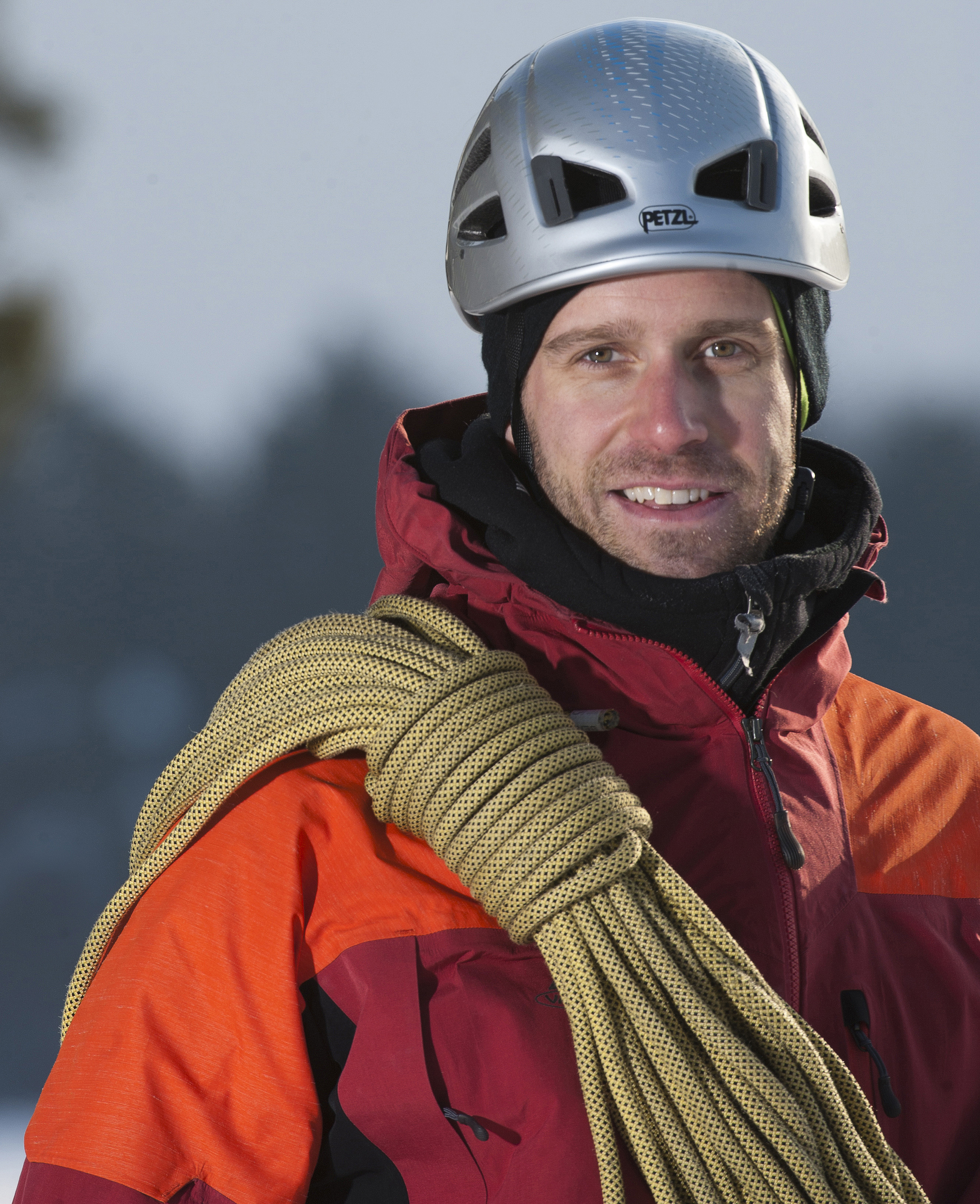
- Born: March 25, 1977 (age 49); Laxå, Örebro County, Sweden
- Occupations: Adventurer, mountaineer
- Website: www.strang.se

Fredrik Sträng (born March 25, 1977) is a Swedish mountaineer, adventurer and documentary film maker.

== Climbing career ==
In 2003, Sträng participated in the Swedish Dhaulagiri expedition which consisted of six Swedes altogether (Joakim Ahlin, Magnus Flock, Martin Emanuelsson, Fredrik Jönsson, Hans Bornefalk and Sträng). Sträng reached the summit, together with Kami Sherpa, who was also part of the expedition.

In 2005, in a commercial expedition led by Ryan Waters, with six climbers and six high-altitude porters, Sträng attempted to climb Mount Everest via the northeast ridge. He turned back only 240 m (790 ft) from the summit because the oxygen did not work and because of an outbreak of a throat infection. During the autumn of 2005, Sträng climbed to the central peak of Shishapangma at an altitude of 8,013 m (26,289 ft).

During the spring of 2006, in another commercial expedition guided by Scott Woolums and Jamie McGuinness, Sträng climbed Mount Everest. He used oxygen starting at Camp 2, and reached the summit with eight of the eight high altitude porters, and five of 12 fellow clients, including fellow Swede Johan Frankelius.

He participated in Jamie McGuinness' international expedition. He was also on the mountain and shot film for two documentaries. One of these documentaries was shown on TV4 in March 2007 and was called Fredrik Sträng och mysteriet på Everest (Fredrik Sträng and the Everest mystery) and was about the theory that George Mallory theoretically could have climbed the mountain as early as June 8, 1924. The other documentary was called 7 Summits and was about Sträng's climb of the tallest mountains on each continent on the planet. Sträng was even on Mount Everest to look for a Vest Pocket Kodak camera which George Mallory's climbing partner Andrew Irvine would have carried and which hypothetically could contain a photograph of Mallory and Irvine on the summit.

In 2006 Sträng finished his 7+7+7 project, the object of which was to climb ”The 7 Summits”, the highest mountains on each continent of the planet. He was also the first Swede to have climbed the official 7 Summits. Sträng's 7 Summits adventure was also turned into a book, 7 berg 7 kontinenter 7 månader (7 Mountains 7 Continents 7 Months), which was published in the autumn of 2007. He was also presented with the award "Adventurer of the Year" following his 7 Summits mountain climb.

In 2009, Sträng and Niklas Hallström became the first Swedish climbers to summit Makalu (8481 m). 20 days later they also summited Lhotse (8516 m).

In 2010, Sträng climbed Gasherbrum 2 (8035 m) and Gasherbrum 1 (8068 m). He was also nominated in 2010 for "Adventurer of the year" along with Natasha Illum-Berg.

In summer 2012, Sträng returned to climb K2 in an international research project by researchers associated with the University of Umeå, Uppsala University, Aalto University, Cranfield University and Åbo Akademi University for four years to study decision making in extreme environments.

Sträng has also participated as a member and photographer in several of Ola Skinnarmo's expeditions. In 2003 an expedition was conducted, In the Footprints of Shackleton, with the purpose of repeating some of the stretches which Sir Ernest Shackleton made in 1916 when he sailed to South Georgia Island in a 6 m-long (20 ft) wooden boat (James Caird) and then traversed the island on foot in order to reach Stommnes. The expedition used a steel boat named Searcher and then crossed South Georgia on skis. A documentary was later released on the expedition, "I Shackletons spår", which was shown in Swedish TV4 during Christmas 2004 and also a book, Skinnarmo i Shackletons spår (Skinnarmo in Shackleton's Footprints) which was published in 2005.

In 2004, Sträng took part in an expedition together with Ola Skinnarmo to Mongolia with the purpose of horseriding, paddling and attempting to locate the world's largest salmoloid, viz. Taimen in the remote river Onon. A documentary, I Djingis Kahns fotspår ("In the Footprints of Genghis Khan") about the trip was shown on TV4 during Christmas 2005.

=== 2008 K2 disaster ===
In 2008, Sträng took part in the International K2 expedition, with eight members (Mike Farris, Chris Klinke, Tim Horvath, Dr Eric Meyer, Chhiring Dorje Sherpa, Chris Warner, Paul Walker and Sträng himself). Of the group's members Chhiring Dorje Sherpa was the one who reached the summit. Sträng and Dr Eric Meyer turned back at 8,000 m (26,000 ft) early in the morning of August 1 when they concluded that the conditions for safely reaching the summit were not satisfied. During August 1 and August 2 the second most devastating accident in the history of K2 occurred: 11 people died. The main reason was falling ice in the area called the bottleneck (a 100 m-tall (330 ft) overarching wall of ice) which caused the majority of the deaths.

In 2017, Sträng returned to K2 with a team in an attempt to finally reach the summit. However, due to rockfall and having to attempt the final episode of the expedition alone, he had to turn back.

In 2025, Sträng completed Norway’s 377 mainland 2000m peaks in record time 68 days, 21 hours and 59 minutes, and becoming the first Swede to summit the peaks.

== TEDx ==
Fredrik has talked at TEDx twice, in Gothenburg, February 2019 with the title “Safety kills” and in Limassol, November 2022 with the title “Decision-making in the death zone”.

== Last of the Wild ==
In 2021 Fredrik went to New Zealand together with Kristofer Hivju to make a short documentary, Last of the Wild, as they explored how Whanganui River became the first river in the world to be granted legal personhood status. The news was met with tears — it reflected over 160 years of fighting for recognition of the rights of the river.

== Personal life ==
Sträng was born in Laxå in Örebro County and learned to climb in the Kilsbergen mountains. He lives in Solna.

== Bibliography ==
- Johnsson, Per; Sträng, Fredrik (2007). 7 berg + 7 kontinenter + 7 månader (in Swedish). ISBN 9789100114848.
- Johnsson, Per; Sträng, Fredrik (2009). K2 På liv och död (in Swedish). ISBN 9789172321960.
