= Meherban Karim =

Pakistani mountaineer (1979–2008)

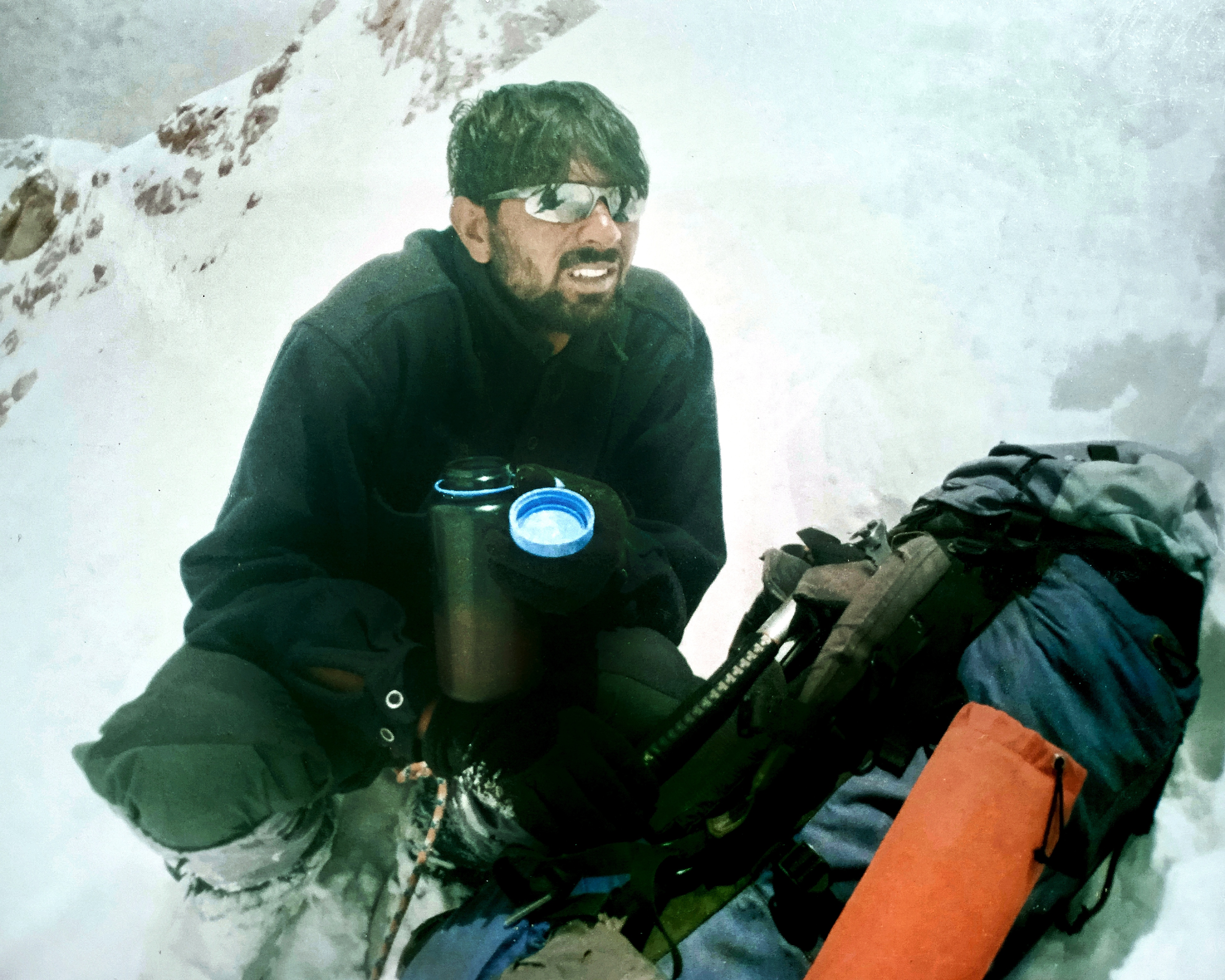
- Meherban Karim at K-2 in 2007
- Born: 21 January 1979; Shimshal, Gilgit-Baltistan, Pakistan
- Died: 2 August 2008 (aged 29); K2, Gilgit-Baltistan, Pakistan
- Occupation: Mountaineer

Meherban Karim (21 January 1979 – 2 August 2008) was a Pakistani mountaineer. He died, along with 10 other mountaineers, in the 2008 K2 disaster, following an avalanche in what was to be one of the deadliest accidents in the history of K2 mountaineering. He summited several eight-thousanders: K2, Nanga Parbat, and Gasherbrum II (without oxygen). In the mountaineering community, he was known as "Karim The Dream" and "Karim Meherban".

== Early life ==
Meherban Karim was born in the Shimshal Valley, Hunza–Nagar District of Gilgit-Baltistan, Pakistan. He spent his childhood in the Shimshal valley, where he explored the mountains and became interested in mountaineering.

== List of mountains climbed ==
Year	Name of Peak	Height	Remark
1997	Minglik Sar	6050m	Successful
2002	Broad Peak	8047m	Unsuccessful
2003	Gasherbrum II	8035m	Successful
2004	Broad Peak	8047m	Unsuccessful
2005	Nanga Parbat	8125m	Successful
2006	Walyoo Sar	6030m (First Ascent)	Successful
2006	K2	8611m	Unsuccessful
2007	K2	8611m	Unsuccessful
2007	Nanga Parbat	8126m (Winter Ascent)	Unsuccessful
2008	K2	8611m	Successful, died during descent

== Mountaineering career ==
Karim started his mountaineering career in 1997 by summiting Mingligh Sar at the age of 18. He then learned the techniques of mountain climbing in Shimshal Valley from Rajab Shah and Meherban Shah. He summited Gasherbrum II in 2003, Nanga Parbat in 2005, and K2 in 2008 without the use of supplemental oxygen. He was also a part of several challenging expeditions, including winter attempts of Nanga Parbat with Italian Alpinist Simone La Terra in 2007–2008.

=== Gasherbrum II ===
In 2002, Karim made his first attempt at an 8000er by climbing Broad Peak, which was unsuccessful due to bad weather conditions. In 2003, he climbed Gasherbrum II in an expedition led by Marin Gogglemann, becoming his first successful attempt at an 8000er mountain. He summited Gasherbrum II without using supplemental oxygen at the age of 23.

=== Nanga Parbat ===
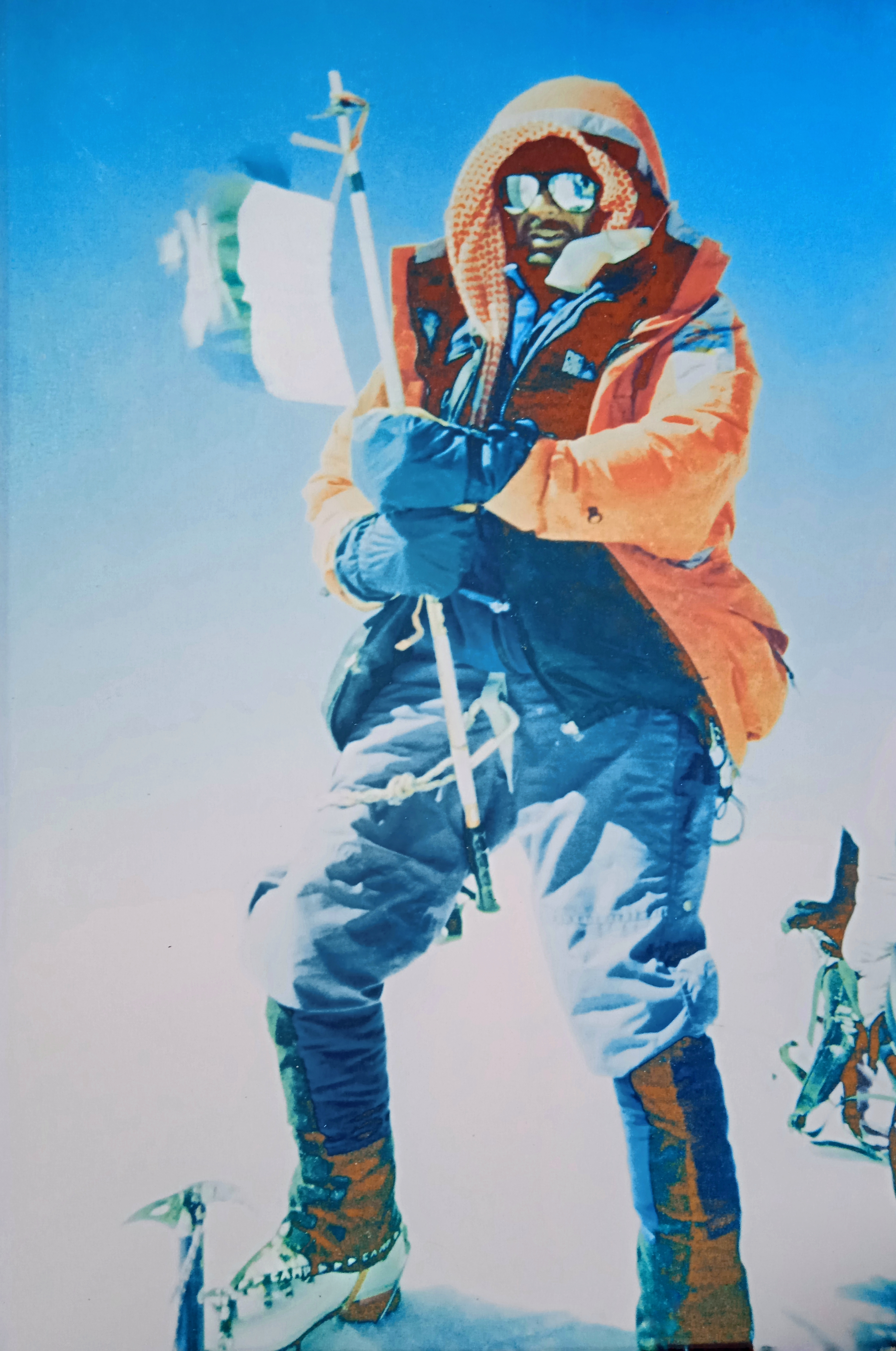
Meherban Karim on the summit of Nanga Parbat in 2005.

In the summer of 2005, Karim and Hugues d'Aubarède reached Camp 4 accompanied by Edurne Pasaban. The pair started their summit push in the dark at 2 a.m. After a long, continuous climb, they reached the summit at 9 a.m. without using any supplemental oxygen. They began their descent together. On the way, Edurne and Hugh stayed at Camp 4. After a continuous climb of 16 hours without oxygen, Karim reached the Base Camp at 6 p.m. He summited Nanga Parbat from Camp 4 and then reached at the basecamp in one Push, It took him 16 hours to reach the summit and then to the base camp. To this day, nobody else has been able to accomplish this feat.

=== Nanga Parbat (winter attempt) ===
In 2007, he was praised by mountaineer Simone La Terra for the winter ascent of Nanga Parbat, which was unsuccessful. They reached the standard base camp on 3 December and established Camp 1 on the Kinshofer Route at 6000m with temperatures of -35 degrees Celsius. Strong winter winds during the night of the 21st blew away their base camp kitchen tent with everything in it. After that, the expedition was called off.

=== K2 ===
Hugues D’Aubarede hired Karim to climb K2 in 2006 and 2007, but both expeditions were called off because of harsh weather conditions. In summer 2008, the pair made their third successful attempt to climb K2, but both died in an avalanche while descending. Karim had summited K2 without using supplemental oxygen.

== Death ==
Karim summited K2 on 1 August 2008 and died on descent near the Bottleneck on 2 August 2008, at the age of 29 years, in a climbing accident while taking part in an international expedition.
