= List of castles in the Hradec Králové Region =

This is a list of castles and chateaux located in the Hradec Králové Region of the Czech Republic.

== A ==
- Adršpach Castle
- Aichelburg Castle
- Albrechtice nad Orlicí Castle
- Arnultovice Chateau

== B ==
- Barchov Chateau
- Bílé Poličany Chateau
- Bolehošťská Lhota Chateau
- Bolkov Castle
- Borohrádek Chateau
- Brada Castle
- Bradlec Castle
- Bradlo Castle
- Břecštejn Castle
- Bystrý Castle

== C ==
- Cerekvice nad Bystřic Chateauí
- Chábory Castle
- Chlumec nad Cidlinou Castle
- Choustníkovo Hradiště Castle
- Chvalkovice Chateau
- Častolovice Chateau
- Černíkovice Chateau
- Červená Hora Castle
- Čeřov Chateau

== D ==
- Dětenice Chateau
- Dobřany Castle
- Dobřenice Chateau
- Dolní Adršpach Chateau
- Dolní Přím Chateau
- Doudleby nad Orlicí Chateau

== F ==
- Fořt Chateau
- Frymburk Castle

== H ==
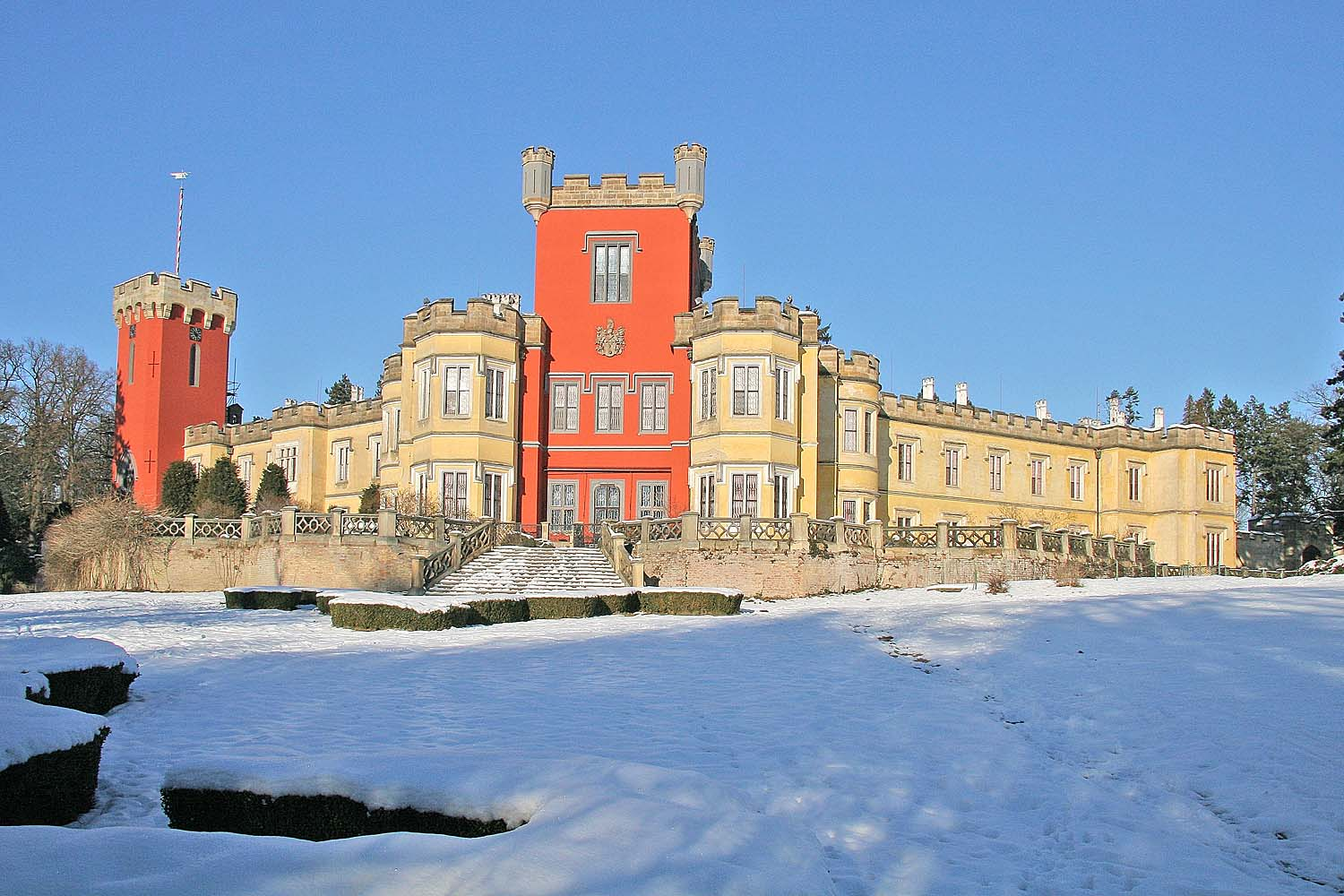
Hrádek u Nechanic Chateau

- Hlodný Castle
- Hlušice Chateau
- Hoděčín Chateau
- Holovousy Chateau
- Horní Maršov Chateau
- Horní Vlčice Castle
- Hořice Chateau
- Hořiněves Chateau
- Hrad u Božanova Castle
- Hradec Králové Castle
- Hrádek u Nechanic Chateau
- Humprecht Chateau

== J ==
- Jaroměř Castle
- Jeřice Chateau
- Jičín Chateau
- Jičíněves Chateau

== K ==
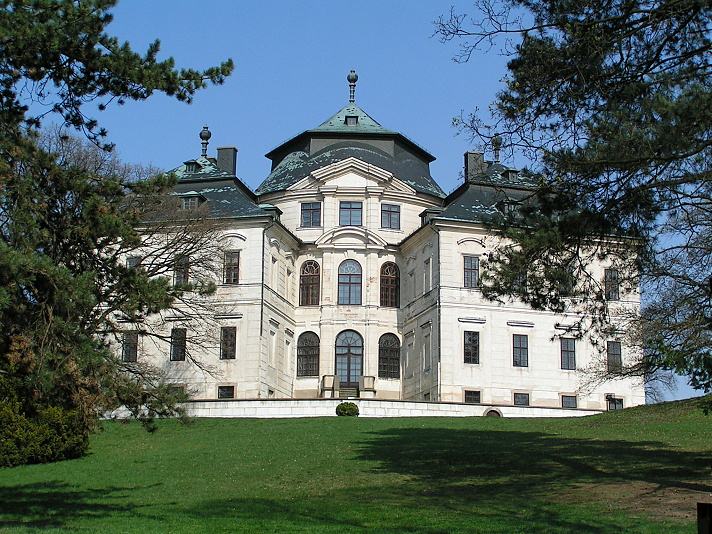
Karlova Koruna Chateau.

- Kalthaus Castle
- Kamenice Chateau
- Karlova Koruna Chateau
- Kopidlno Chateau
- Kost Castle
- Kostelec nad Orlicí Chateau
- Kozlov Castle
- Kratonohy Chateau
- Kumburk Castle
- Kvasiny Chateau

== L ==
- Lázně Bělohrad Chateau
- Libosad Chateau

== M ==
- Meziměstí Chateau
- Miletín Castle
- Miletín Chateau
- Milíčeves Chateau
- Mladějov Chateau
- Myštěves Chateau

== N ==
- Náchod Chateau
- Neděliště Chateau
- Nové Město nad Metují Chateau
- Nový Bydžov Castle
- Nový Hrad Castle

== O ==
- Obora Chateau
- Opočno Chateau

== P ==
- Pařez Castle
- Pecka Castle
- Pěčín Castle
- Podhůří Chateau
- Podlesí Chateau Chateau
- Potštejn Castle
- Potštejn Chateau
- Přestavlky Chateau
- Purkhybl Castle

== R ==
- Ratibořice Chateau
- Rechenburk Castle
- Rohoznice Chateau
- Rokytnice v Orlických horách Chateau
- Rotemberk Castle
- Rychmberk Castle
- Rychnov nad Kněžnou Chateau
- Rýzmburk Castle

== S ==
- Skalka Chateau, Podbřezí
- Skály (u Broumova) Castle
- Skály Chateau
- Skřivany Chateau
- Skuhrov Castle
- Sloupno Chateau
- Smidary Chateau
- Smiřice Chateau
- Sobčice Chateau
- Solnice Chateau
- Staré Hrady Chateau
- Stárkov Chateau
- Stěžery Chateau
- Stračov Chateau
- Střmen Castle
- Šluspárk Castle

== T ==
- Teplice nad Metují Chateau
- Týniště nad Orlicí Chateau

== V ==
- Velešov Castle
- Velichovky Chateau
- Veliš Castle
- Velký Vřešťov Castle
- Vízmburk Castle
- Vlčice Chateau
- Vlčinec Castle
- Vokšice Chateau
- Volanice Chateau
- Vražba Castle
- Vrchlabí Chateau
- Vysoké Veselí Chateau
- Výrov Castle

== Z ==
- Železnice Castle
- Žíreč Chateau

== See also ==
- List of castles in the Czech Republic
- List of castles in Europe
- List of castles
