= Hrádek =

Hrádek may refer to places in the Czech Republic:

- Hrádek (Frýdek-Místek District), a municipality and village in the Moravian-Silesian Region
- Hrádek (Hradec Králové District), a municipality and village in the Hradec Králové Region
  - Hrádek u Nechanic, a castle
- Hrádek (Klatovy District), a municipality and village in the Plzeň Region
- Hrádek (Rokycany District), a town in the Plzeň Region
- Hrádek (Ústí nad Orlicí District), a municipality and village in the Pardubice Region
- Hrádek (Znojmo District), a municipality and village in the South Moravian Region
- Hrádek, a village and part of Ctiboř (Benešov District) in the Central Bohemian Region
- Hrádek, a hamlet and part of Horka II in the Central Bohemian Region
- Hrádek, a village and part of Krajková in the Karlovy Vary Region
- Hrádek, a village and part of Manětín in the Plzeň Region
- Hrádek, a village and part of Raná (Louny District) in the Ústí nad Labem Region
- Hrádek, a village and part of Srch in the Pardubice Region
- Hrádek, a village and part of Trhové Sviny in the South Bohemian Region
- Hrádek na Vlárské dráze, a village and part of Slavičín in the Zlín Region
- Hrádek nad Nisou, a town in the Liberec Region
- Červený Hrádek, a municipality and village in the South Bohemian Region
- Nový Hrádek, a market town in the Hradec Králové Region
- Starosedlský Hrádek, a municipality and village in the Central Bohemian Region
