= Chvalkovice =

Chvalkovice may refer to places in the Czech Republic:

- Chvalkovice (Náchod District), a municipality and village in the Hradec Králové Region
- Chvalkovice (Vyškov District), a municipality and village in the South Moravian Region
- Chvalkovice, a village and part of Dešná (Jindřichův Hradec District) in the South Bohemian Region
- Chvalkovice na Hané, a village and part of Ivanovice na Hané in the South Moravian Region
