= Jičín (disambiguation) =

Jičín is a town in the Hradec Králové Region, Czech Republic.

Jičín may also refer to places in the Czech Republic:

- Jičín Uplands, a nature region
- Nový Jičín, a town in the Moravian-Silesian Region
- Starý Jičín, a municipality and village in the Moravian-Silesian Region

== See also ==
- Jičíněves, a municipality and village in the Hradec Králové Region
