= Syrovatka =

Syrovatka may refer to:

- Syrovátka, a village in the Czech Republic
- Syrovatka River, a river in Ukraine that runs near Krasnopillia, Sumy Oblast
- Syrovatka (Sumy Oblast), a village in Ukraine on Highway H12
