= Dobřenice =

- Municipality
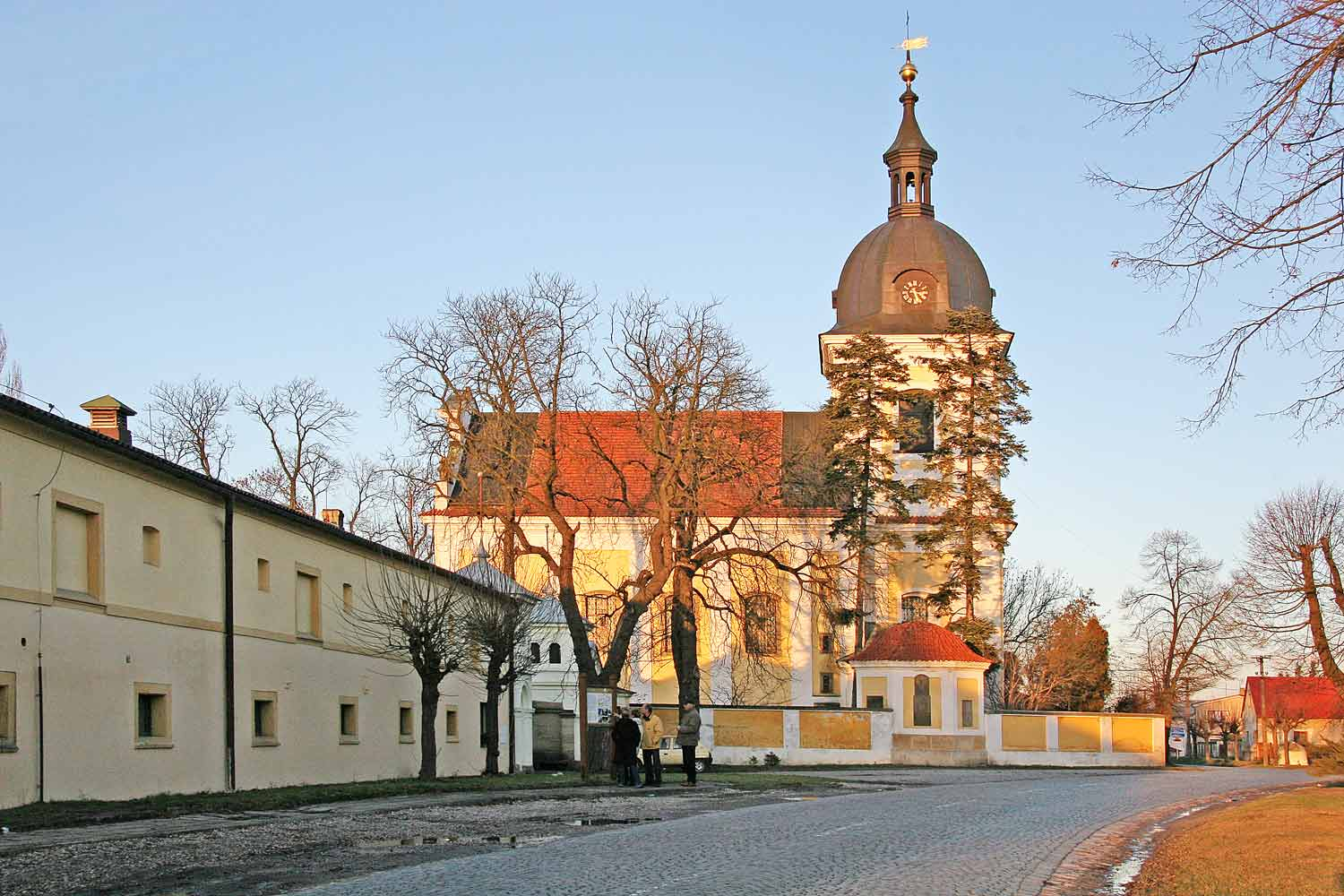
- Church of Saint Clement

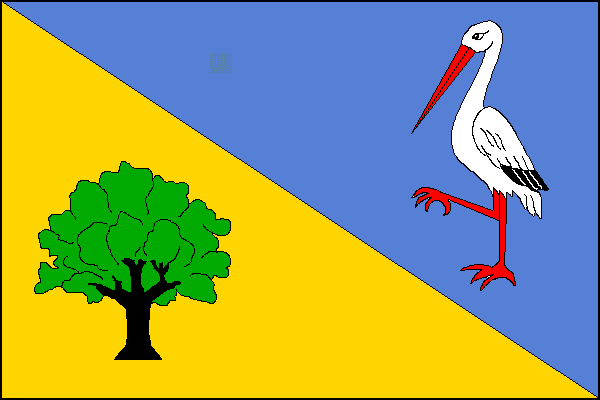
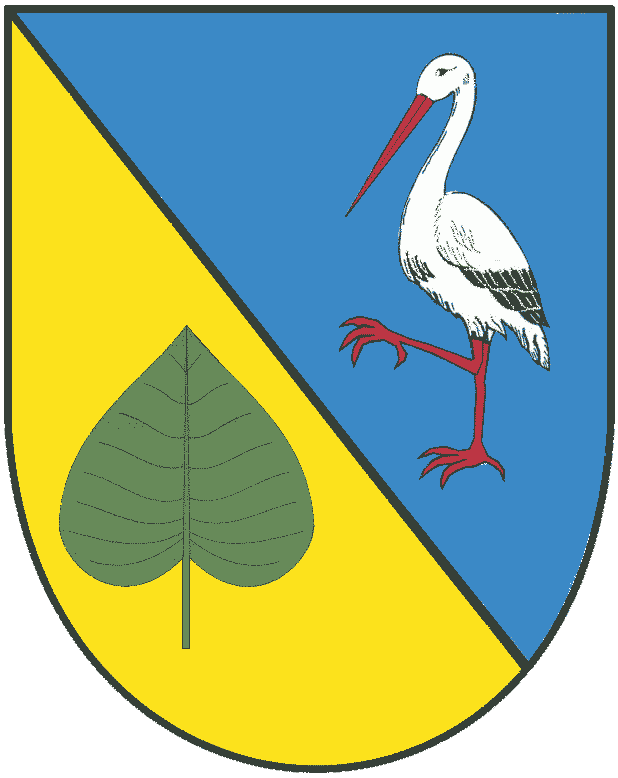
- Flag Coat of arms

- Location in the Czech Republic
- Coordinates: 50°8′52″N 15°38′28″E
- Country: Czech Republic
- Region: Hradec Králové
- District: Hradec Králové
- First mentioned: 1339

Area
  - Total: 7.44 km^{2} (2.87 sq mi)
- Elevation: 267 m (876 ft)

Population (2026-01-01)
  - Total: 545
  - Density: 73.3/km^{2} (190/sq mi)
- Time zone: UTC+1 (CET)
  - Summer (DST): UTC+2 (CEST)
- Postal code: 503 25
- Website: dobrenice.cz

Dobřenice is a municipality and village in Hradec Králové District in the Hradec Králové Region of the Czech Republic. It has about 500 inhabitants.

== Etymology ==
The name is derived from the personal name Dobřen, meaning "the village of Dobřen's people".

== Geography ==
Dobřenice is located about 14 kilometres (9 mi) southwest of Hradec Králové. It lies in the East Elbe Table. The highest point is the flat hill Velká Dorota at 292 m (958 ft) above sea level.

== History ==
The first written mention of Dobřenice is from 1339.

== Demographics ==
Historical population

Year	Pop.	±%
1869	689	—
1880	756	+9.7%
1890	724	−4.2%
1900	689	−4.8%
1910	717	+4.1%

Year	Pop.	±%
1921	685	−4.5%
1930	683	−0.3%
1950	625	−8.5%
1961	658	+5.3%
1970	649	−1.4%

Year	Pop.	±%
1980	631	−2.8%
1991	581	−7.9%
2001	584	+0.5%
2011	547	−6.3%
2021	561	+2.6%

Source: Censuses

== Transport ==
The D11 motorway (part of the European route E67) from Prague to Hradec Králové runs through the municipality.

The railway line Hradec Králové–Chlumec nad Cidlinou passes through the municipal territory, but the station named Dobřenice is located in neighbouring Syrovátka just behind the municipal border.

== Sights ==
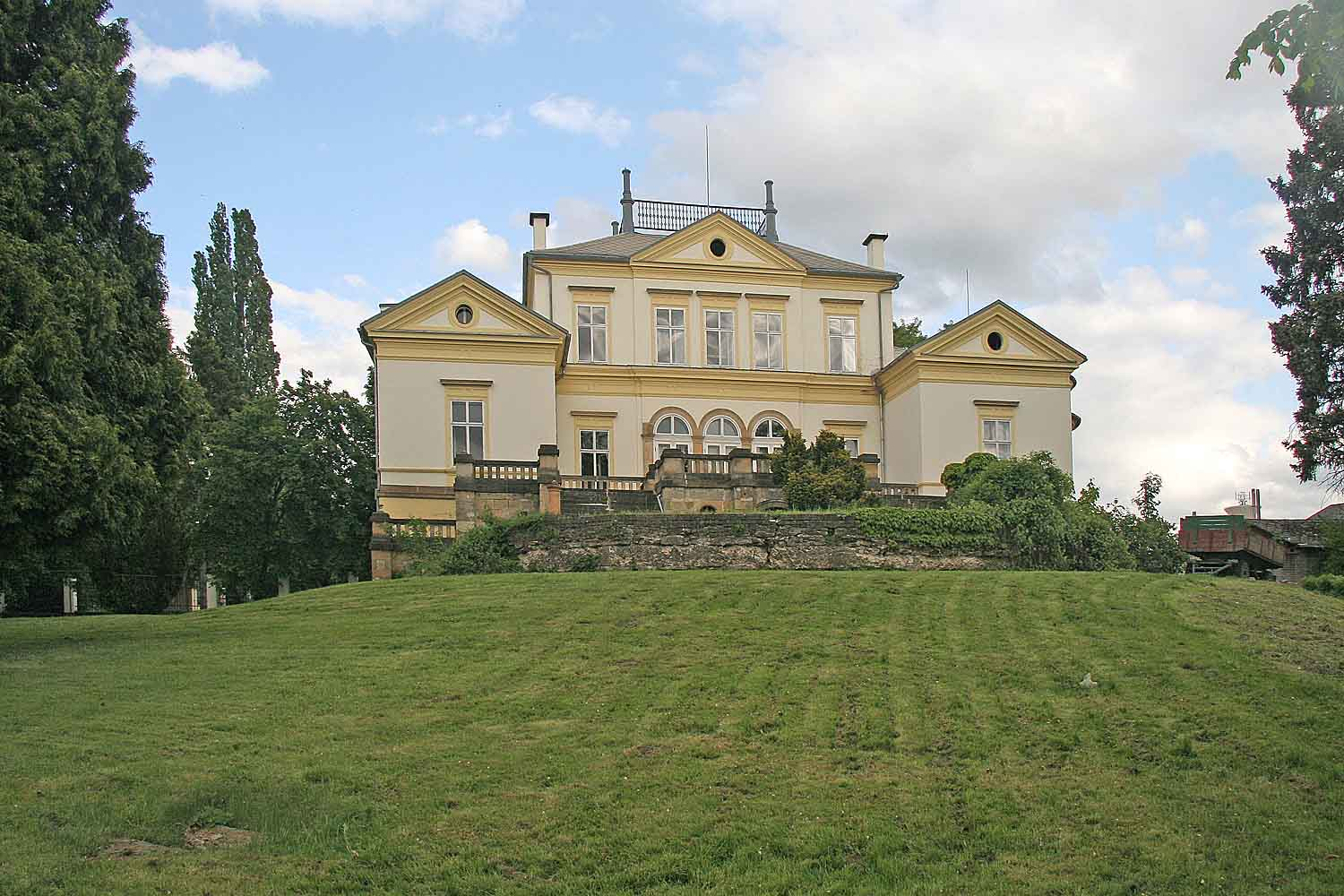
Dobřenice Castle

The Dobřenice Castle was built in the Baroque style in 1693. It replaced an older fortress.

The Church of Saint Clement was built in 1739. The current Baroque church replaced an old wooden church from the 14th century.
