= Hlušice =

- Municipality
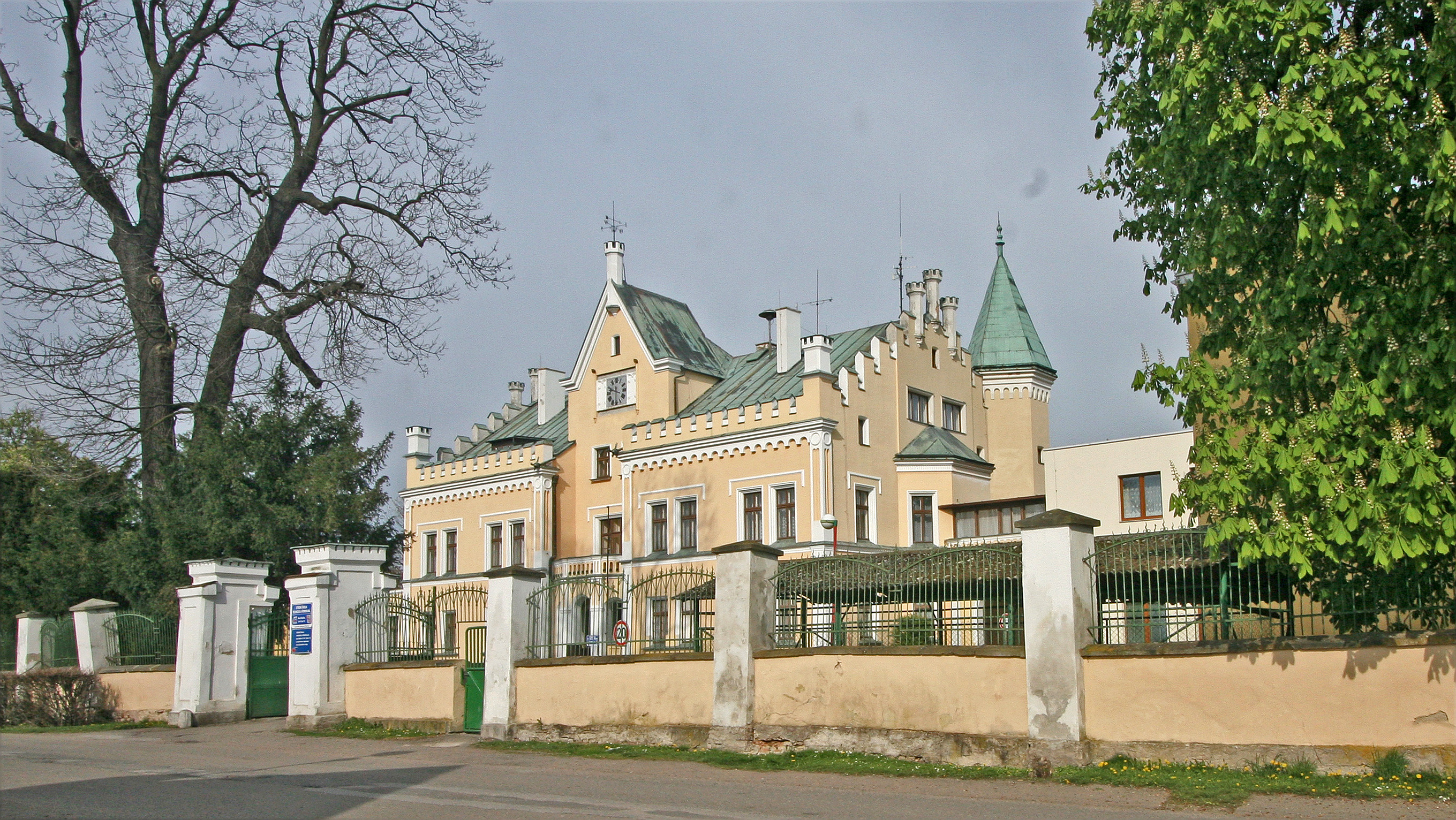
- Hlušice Castle

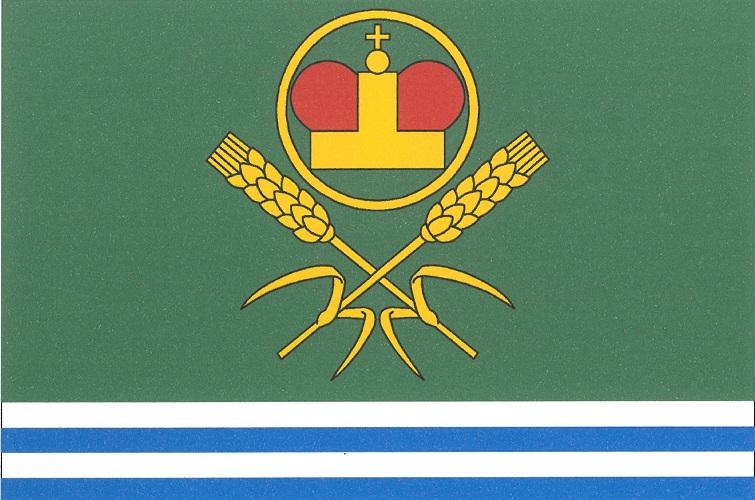
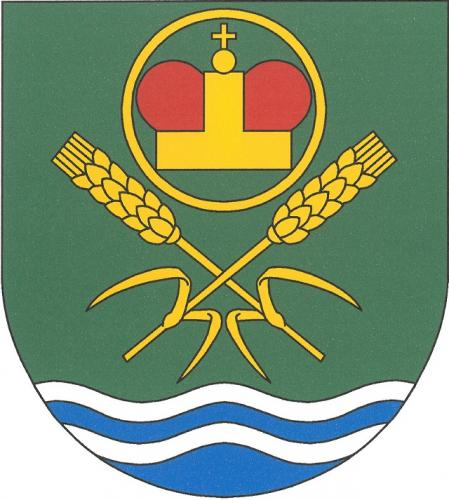
- Flag Coat of arms

- Location in the Czech Republic
- Coordinates: 50°15′53″N 15°24′12″E
- Country: Czech Republic
- Region: Hradec Králové
- District: Hradec Králové
- First mentioned: 1322

Area
  - Total: 11.12 km^{2} (4.29 sq mi)
- Elevation: 257 m (843 ft)

Population (2026-01-01)
  - Total: 745
  - Density: 67.0/km^{2} (174/sq mi)
- Time zone: UTC+1 (CET)
  - Summer (DST): UTC+2 (CEST)
- Postal code: 503 56
- Website: www.hlusice.com

Hlušice is a municipality and village in Hradec Králové District in the Hradec Králové Region of the Czech Republic. It has about 700 inhabitants.

== Administrative division ==
Hlušice consists of two municipal parts (in brackets population according to the 2021 census):

- Hlušice (428)
- Hlušičky (244)

== Demographics ==
Historical population
Year	Pop.	±%
1869	1,130	—
1880	1,191	+5.4%
1890	1,158	−2.8%
1900	1,083	−6.5%
1910	1,162	+7.3%
1921	1,140	−1.9%
1930	1,078	−5.4%
1950	936	−13.2%
1961	899	−4.0%
1970	779	−13.3%
1980	725	−6.9%
1991	705	−2.8%
2001	739	+4.8%
2011	705	−4.6%
2021	672	−4.7%
Source: Censuses

== Notable people ==
- Ladislav Vízek (born 1955), footballer; raised here
