= Velký Vřešťov =

- Market town
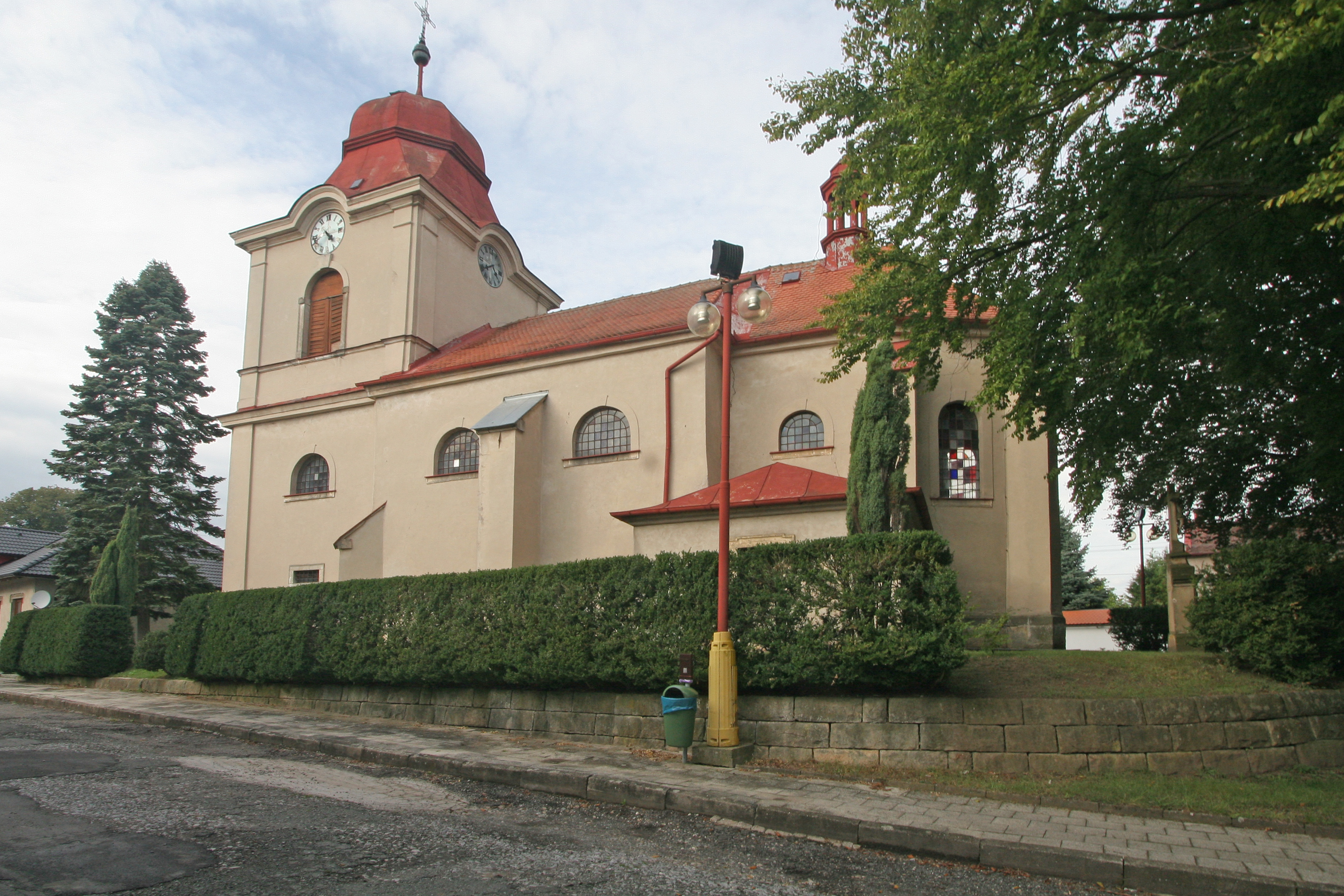
- Church of All Saints

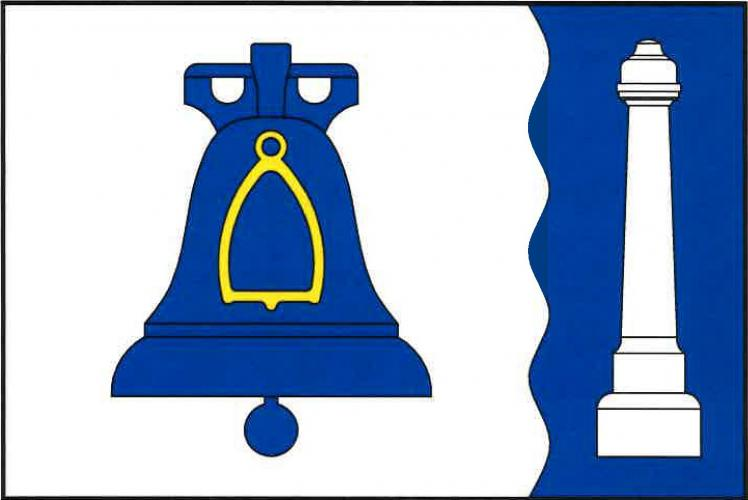
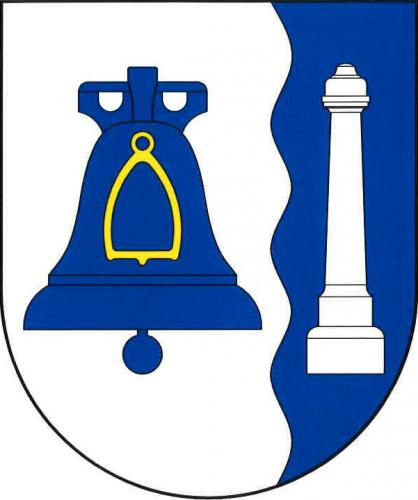
- Flag Coat of arms

- Location in the Czech Republic
- Coordinates: 50°21′21″N 15°45′8″E
- Country: Czech Republic
- Region: Hradec Králové
- District: Trutnov
- First mentioned: 1348

Area
  - Total: 8.50 km^{2} (3.28 sq mi)
- Elevation: 273 m (896 ft)

Population (2026-01-01)
  - Total: 252
  - Density: 29.6/km^{2} (76.8/sq mi)
- Time zone: UTC+1 (CET)
  - Summer (DST): UTC+2 (CEST)
- Postal code: 544 54
- Website: www.velkyvrestov.cz

Velký Vřešťov (Czech pronunciation: [ˈvɛlkiː ˈvr̝ɛʃcof]) is a market town in Trutnov District in the Hradec Králové Region of the Czech Republic. It has about 300 inhabitants.

== Etymology ==
The village was initially called Vřeščov and the name was derived from the personal name Vřešč. The form Vřešťov first appeared in 1378. The prefix velký means 'great' and served to distinguish it from the neighbouring village of Malý Vřešťov ('small Vřešťov', today an integral part of Velký Vřešťov).

== Geography ==
Velký Vřešťov is located about 17 kilometres (11 mi) north of Hradec Králové. It lies mostly in the Jičín Uplands, but the eastern part of the municipal territory extends into the East Elbe Table. The highest point is at 458 m (1,503 ft) above sea level. The Trotina Stream flows through the market town.

== History ==
The first written mention of Velký Vřešťov is from 1348.

== Demographics ==
Historical population

Year	Pop.	±%
1869	581	—
1880	594	+2.2%
1890	553	−6.9%
1900	564	+2.0%
1910	490	−13.1%

Year	Pop.	±%
1921	469	−4.3%
1930	450	−4.1%
1950	308	−31.6%
1961	278	−9.7%
1970	216	−22.3%

Year	Pop.	±%
1980	205	−5.1%
1991	195	−4.9%
2001	197	+1.0%
2011	218	+10.7%
2021	254	+16.5%

Source: Censuses

== Transport ==
There are no railways or major roads passing through the municipality.

== Sights ==
The main landmark of Velký Vřešťov is the Church of All Saints. Originally a Gothic church, it was rebuilt in the Baroque style in 1723, after it was damaged by the 1720 fire.
