= Dolní Přím =

- Municipality
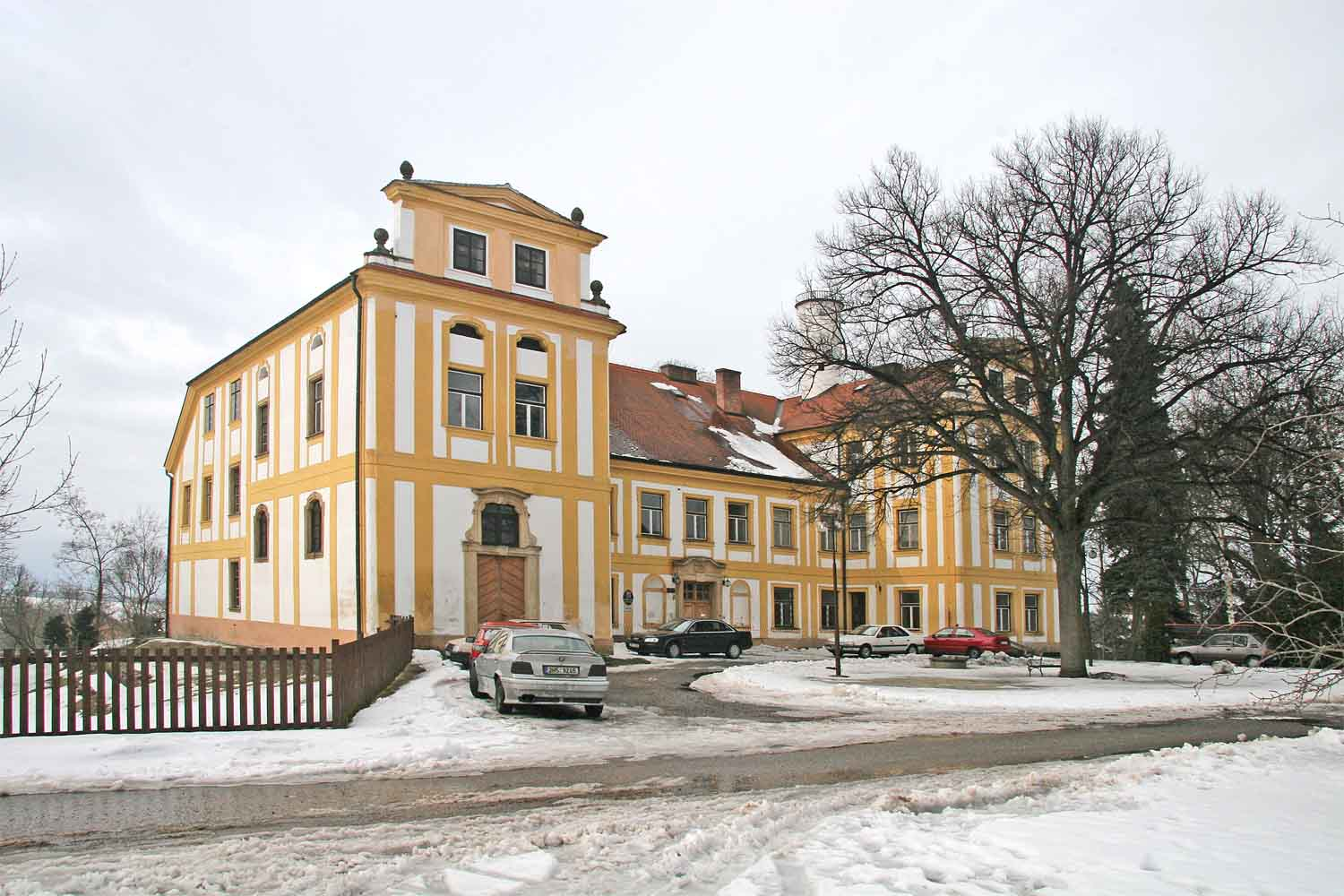
- Dolní Přím Castle

- Flag Coat of arms

- Location in the Czech Republic
- Coordinates: 50°14′23″N 15°42′31″E
- Country: Czech Republic
- Region: Hradec Králové
- District: Hradec Králové
- First mentioned: 1378

Area
  - Total: 10.84 km^{2} (4.19 sq mi)
- Elevation: 284 m (932 ft)

Population (2026-01-01)
  - Total: 773
  - Density: 71.3/km^{2} (185/sq mi)
- Time zone: UTC+1 (CET)
  - Summer (DST): UTC+2 (CEST)
- Postal code: 503 16
- Website: www.dolni-prim.cz

Dolní Přím is a municipality and village in Hradec Králové District in the Hradec Králové Region of the Czech Republic. It has about 800 inhabitants.

== Administrative division ==
Dolní Přím consists of five municipal parts (in brackets population according to the 2021 census):

- Dolní Přím (370)
- Horní Přím (117)
- Jehlice (16)
- Nový Přím (49)
- Probluz (216)

== Etymology ==
The initial name of the settlement was Přín. The name was derived from the Czech word pře (i.e. 'dispute'). At the beginning of the 15th century, two villages began to be distinguished: Dolní Přín ('lower Přín') and Horní Přín ('upper Přín'). In the 17th century, the name was distorted to Přím due to its resemblance to the word přímý ('straight', 'direct').

== Geography ==
Dolní Přím is located about 8 kilometres (5 mi) west of Hradec Králové. It lies in the East Elbe Table. The highest point is at 311 m (1,020 ft) above sea level.

== History ==
The first written mention of Dolní Přím is from 1378, when there was a fortress owned by Pešík Přín of Přín.

Dolní Přím was partly the site of the Battle of Königgrätz in 1866.

== Demographics ==
Historical population

Year	Pop.	±%
1869	992	—
1880	993	+0.1%
1890	1,019	+2.6%
1900	1,029	+1.0%
1910	987	−4.1%

Year	Pop.	±%
1921	961	−2.6%
1930	950	−1.1%
1950	714	−24.8%
1961	697	−2.4%
1970	632	−9.3%

Year	Pop.	±%
1980	565	−10.6%
1991	503	−11.0%
2001	543	+8.0%
2011	636	+17.1%
2021	768	+20.8%

Source: Censuses

== Transport ==
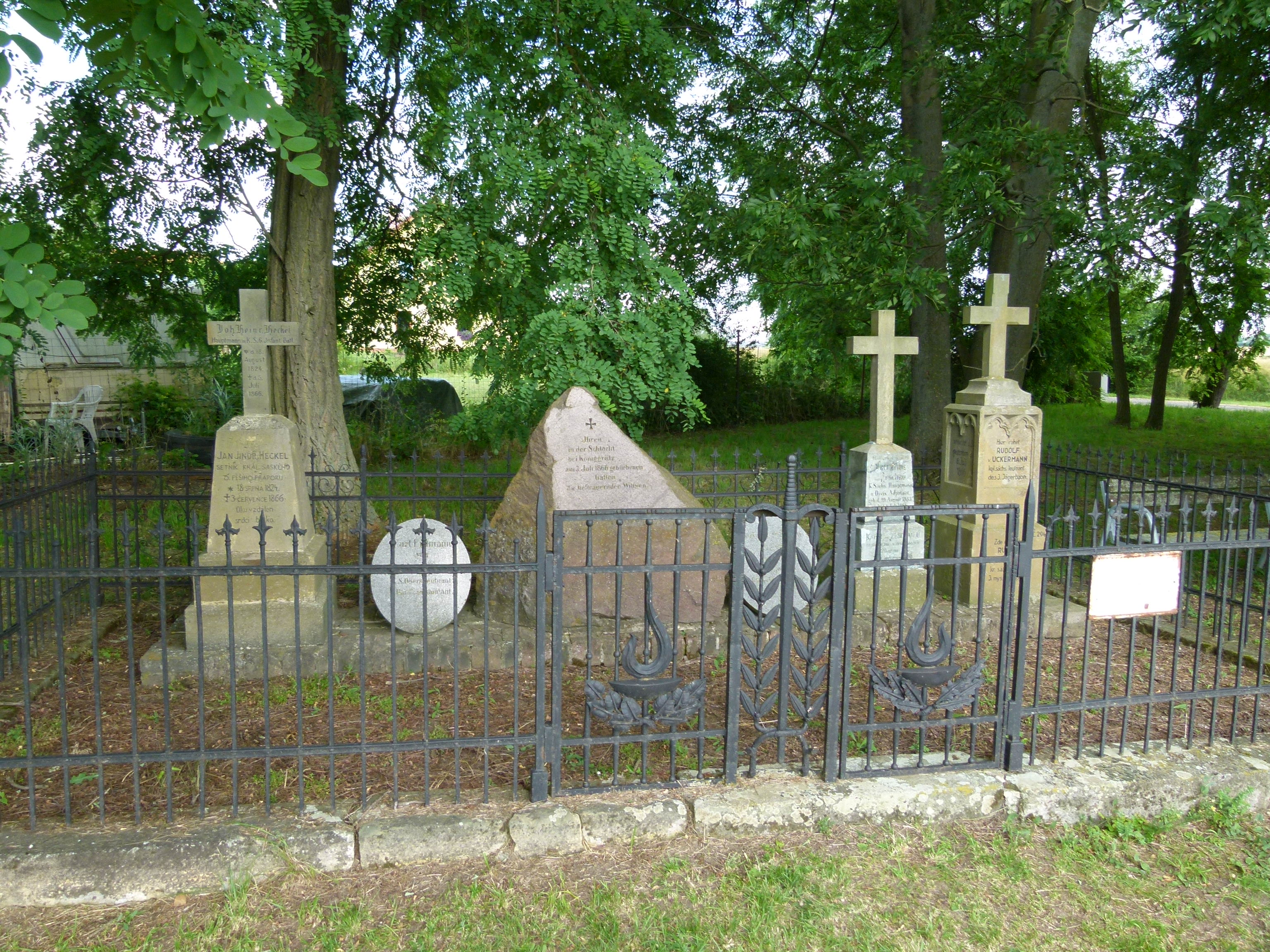
Memorials to the fallen of the battle in 1866

There are no railways or major roads passing through the municipality.

== Sights ==
The main landmark is the Dolní Přím Castle. It was originally a Gothic feudal seat, rebuilt into a Renaissance-Baroque Jesuit residence in 1681. Today it houses the municipal office and is partially used for residential purposes.
