= Hrádek u Nechanic =

19th Century decorative Gothic castle in Czech Republic

Coordinates: 50.2235°N 15.6672°E

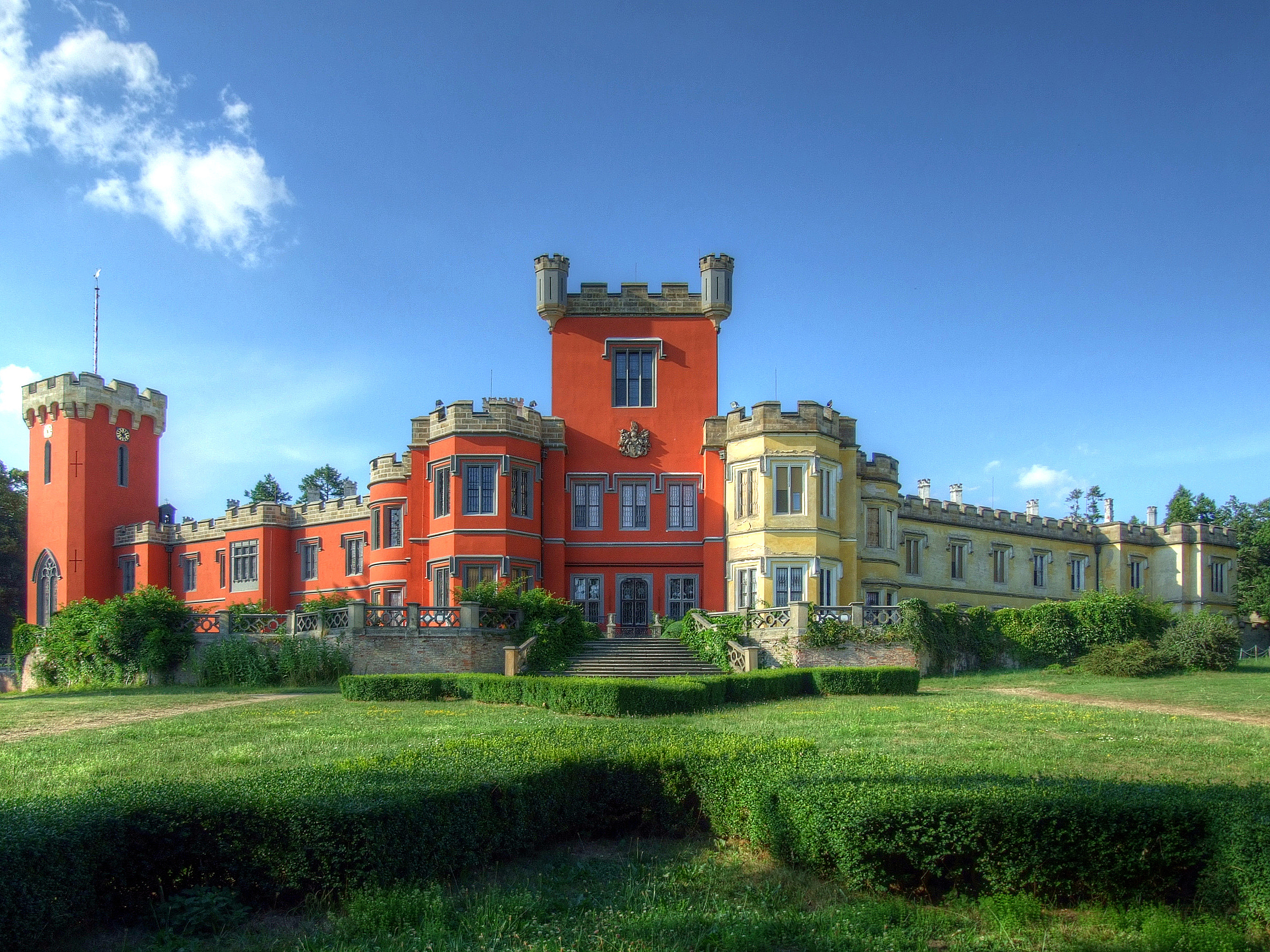
Hrádek u Nechanic Castle

Hrádek u Nechanic is a 19th-century Gothic style Romantic castle near the town of Hrádek in the Hradec Králové Region of the Czech Republic. In 2001 Hrádek u Nechanic was declared part of the National Cultural Heritage. The chateau is administered by the National Heritage Trust and the Ministry of Culture.

== History ==
Hrádek u Nechanic was built between 1839 and 1857 as a representative and summer seat by Count František Arnošt of Harrach, one of the most important representatives of the Jilemnice dynasty. The young Austrian architect Karl Fischer led building operations and suggested decoration of the castle's interior. The castle was designed by the English architect Edward Buckton Lamb. It is referred to as "Little Hluboká" because it resembles to Hluboká Castle in southern Bohemia. Most of the furniture was made by local artisans. The remainder of the interior was brought from Italy and Austria. Around the same time, L. Krüger converted part of the local forest into a park. In the left part of the park, a reserve and pheasantry were founded. In 1945, the castle was confiscated because of the Beneš decrees.

== Description ==
The castle is a two-storey building with a prismatic tower, which includes battlements, a small shooting tower in the middle and two polygonal risalits on both sides. The castle consists of two symmetrical wings. The west wing includes St. Ann's chapel. On the east side are economic and administrative buildings, and a theatre. The park covers 30 hectares (74 acres) and includes meadows, and forests with deciduous and conifer trees. Some trees are of exotic origin.

== Films and television ==
Many films and television series, including Anička s lískovými oříšky, Atentát, Fišpánská jablíčka, The Wolves of Willoughby Chase, From Hell, Hotel for Strangers, Jane Eyre and Dark Blue World, were filmed at Hrádek u Nechanic.
