= Srch =

- Municipality
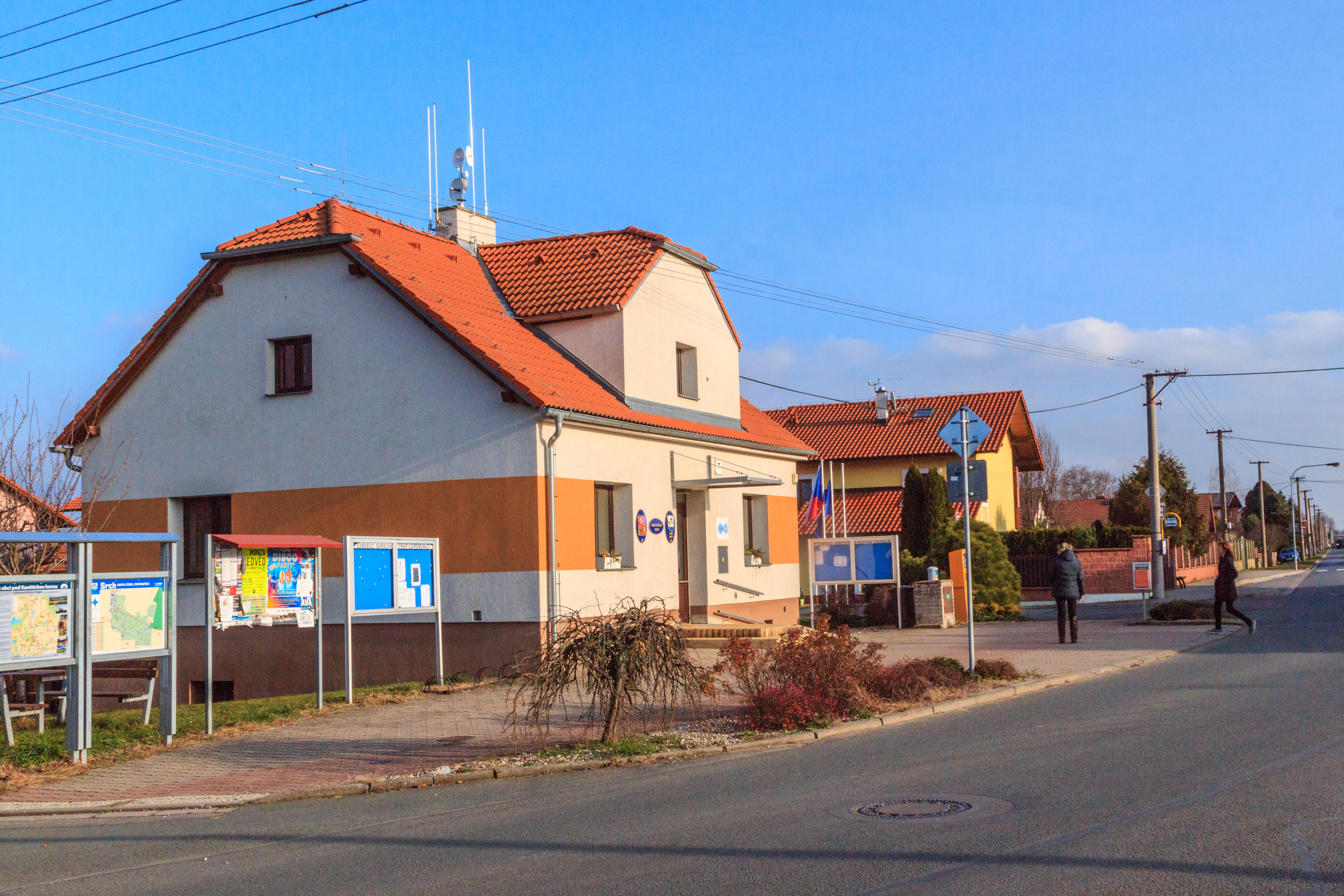
- Municipal office

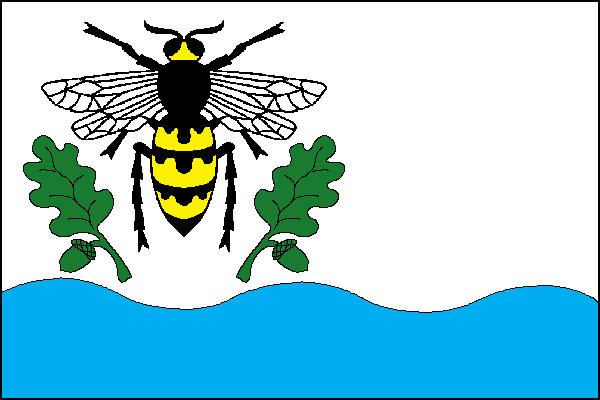
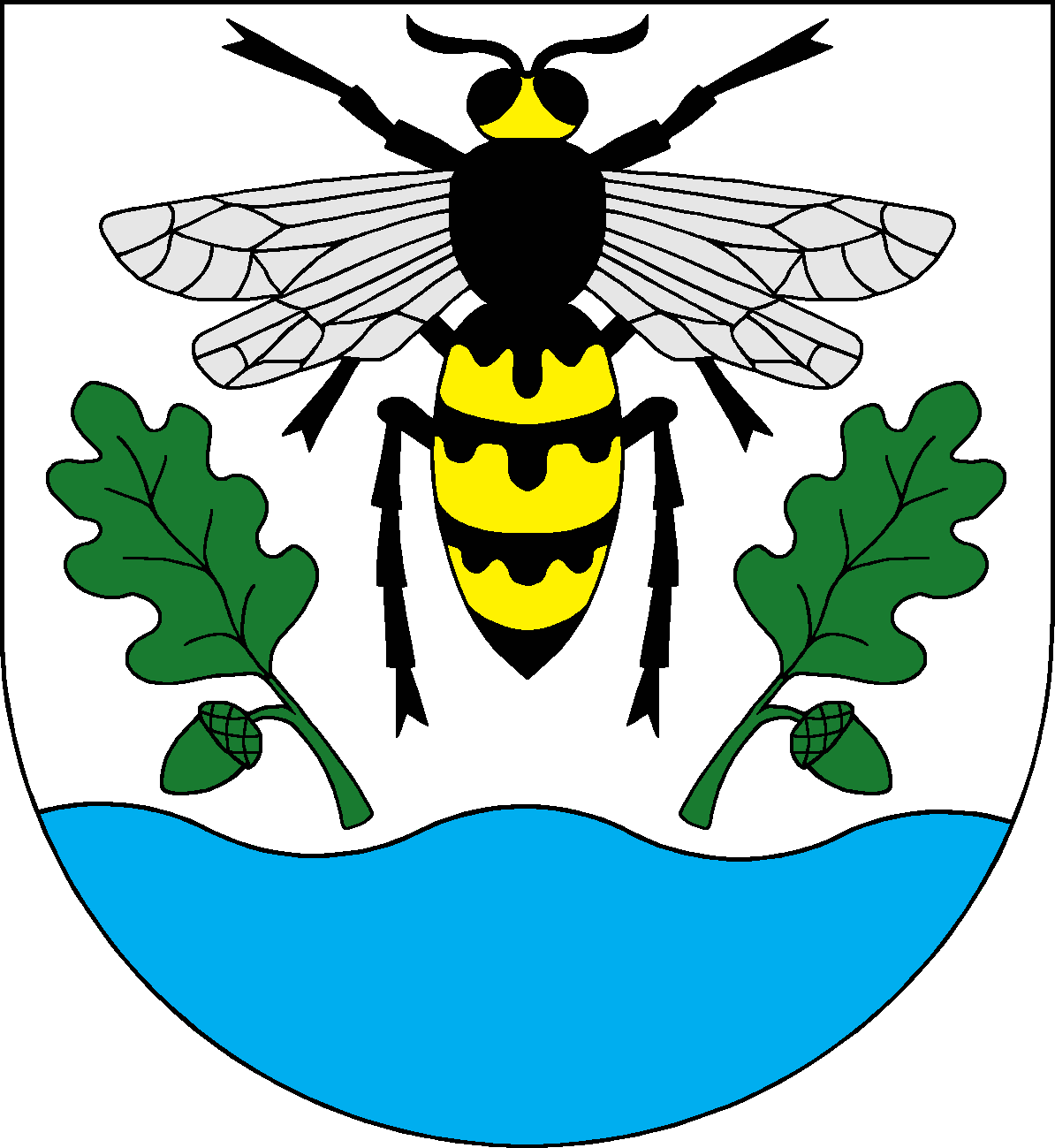
- Flag Coat of arms

- Location in the Czech Republic
- Coordinates: 50°5′6″N 15°45′49″E
- Country: Czech Republic
- Region: Pardubice
- District: Pardubice
- First mentioned: 1436

Area
  - Total: 8.43 km^{2} (3.25 sq mi)
- Elevation: 235 m (771 ft)

Population (2026-01-01)
  - Total: 1,799
  - Density: 213/km^{2} (553/sq mi)
- Time zone: UTC+1 (CET)
  - Summer (DST): UTC+2 (CEST)
- Postal codes: 533 45, 533 52
- Website: obecsrch.cz

Srch (German: Sirch) is a municipality and village in Pardubice District in the Pardubice Region of the Czech Republic. It has about 1,800 inhabitants.

== Administrative division ==
Srch consists of three municipal parts (in brackets population according to the 2021 census):

- Srch (1,316)
- Hrádek (224)
- Pohránov (145)

== Demographics ==
Historical population
Year	Pop.	±%
1869	686	—
1880	810	+18.1%
1890	829	+2.3%
1900	761	−8.2%
1910	808	+6.2%
1921	770	−4.7%
1930	840	+9.1%
1950	822	−2.1%
1961	832	+1.2%
1970	727	−12.6%
1980	744	+2.3%
1991	804	+8.1%
2001	912	+13.4%
2011	1,367	+49.9%
2021	1,685	+23.3%
Source: Censuses
