= Bradlec =

- Municipality
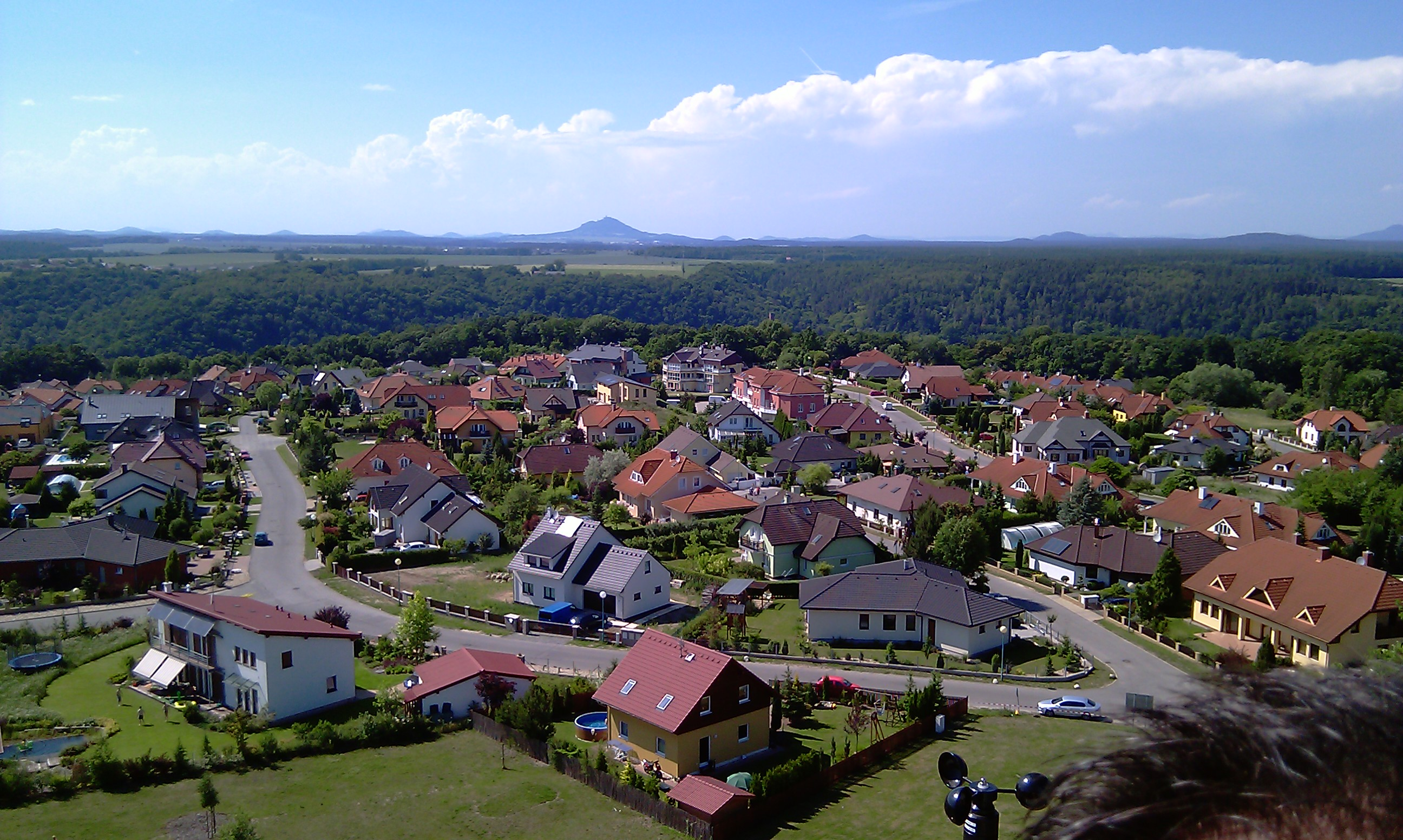
- View of Bradlec

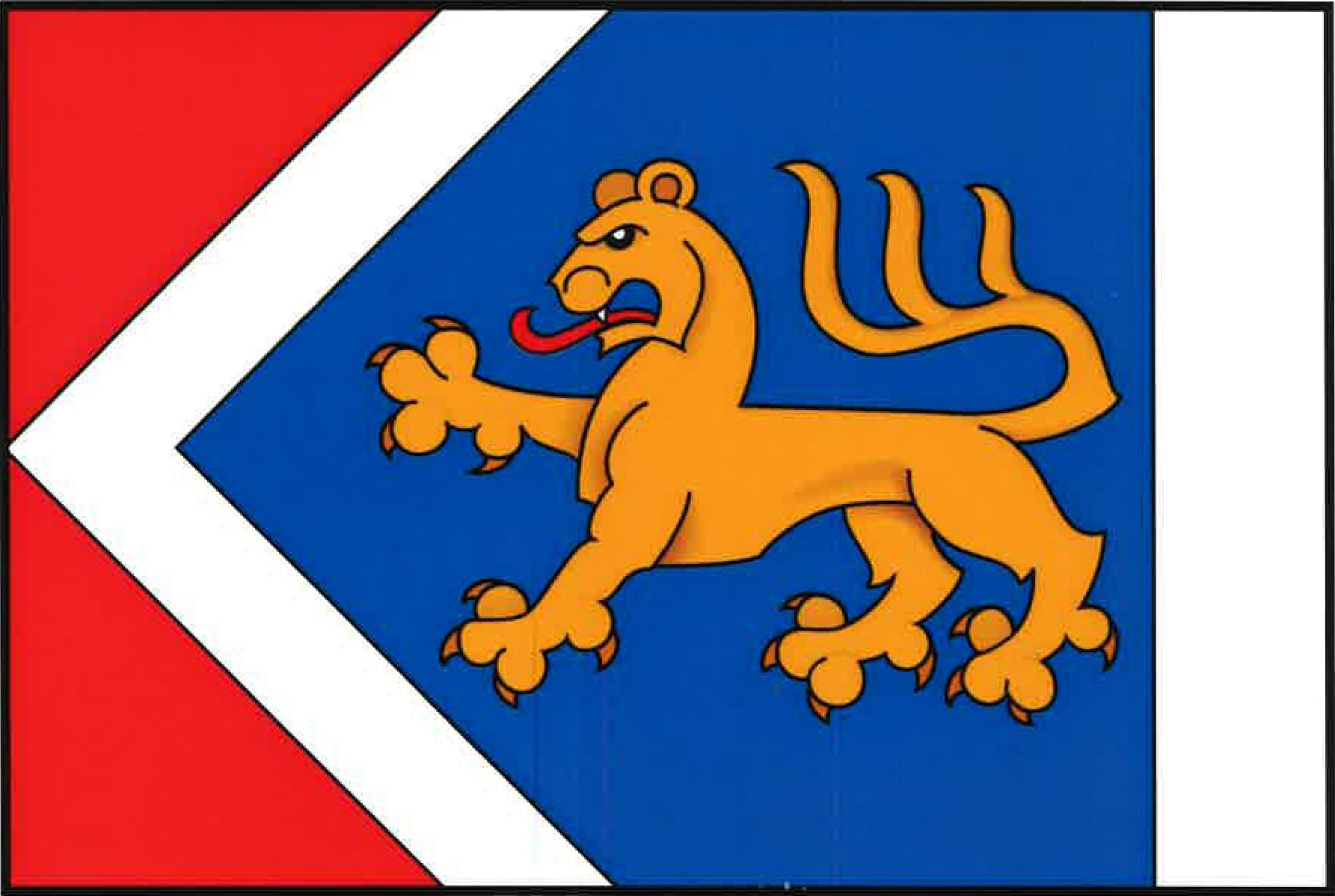
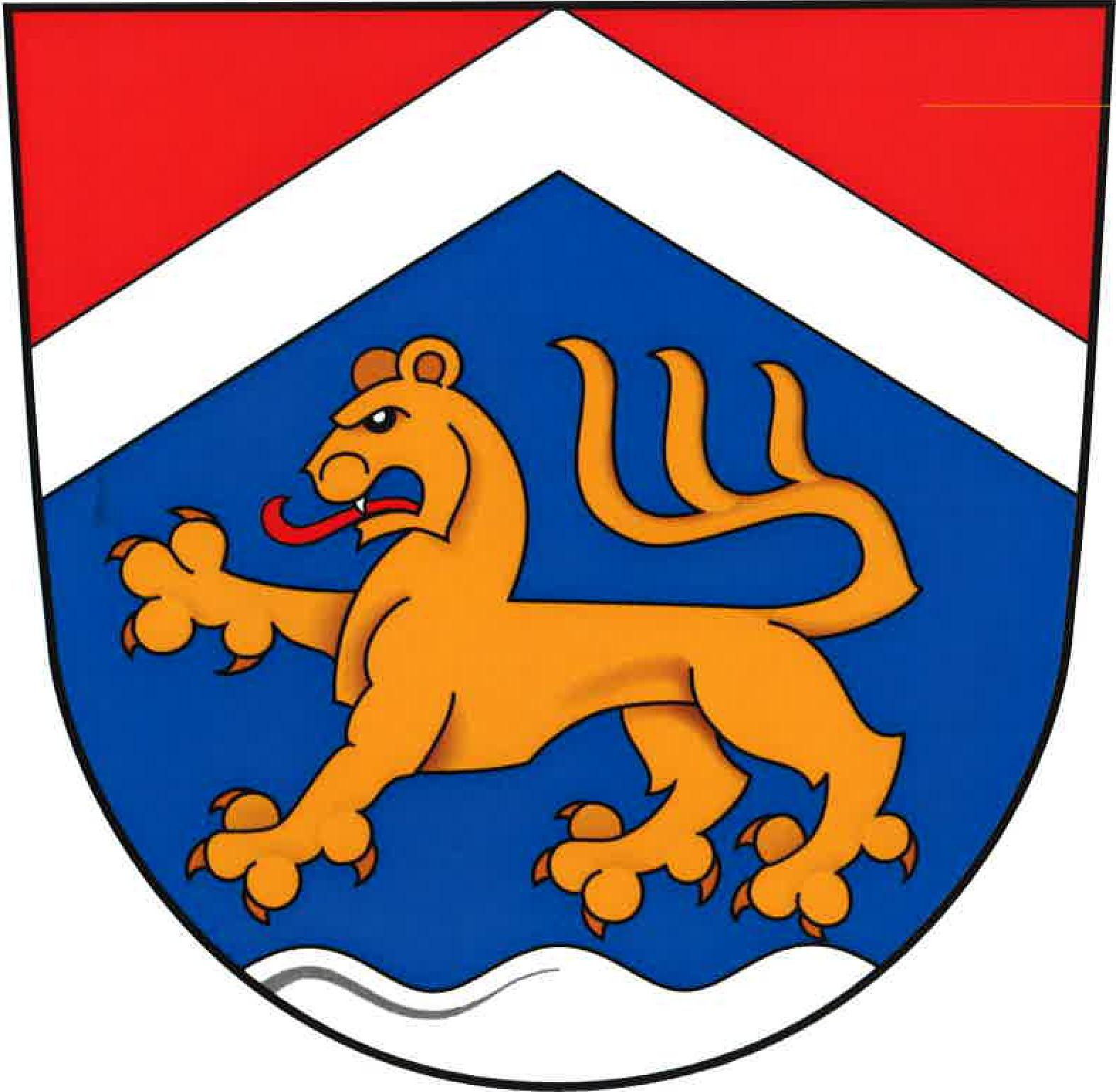
- Flag Coat of arms

- Location in the Czech Republic
- Coordinates: 50°27′5″N 15°54′37″E
- Country: Czech Republic
- Region: Central Bohemian
- District: Mladá Boleslav
- First mentioned: 1382

Area
  - Total: 2.63 km^{2} (1.02 sq mi)
- Elevation: 293 m (961 ft)

Population (2026-01-01)
  - Total: 1,453
  - Density: 552/km^{2} (1,430/sq mi)
- Time zone: UTC+1 (CET)
  - Summer (DST): UTC+2 (CEST)
- Postal code: 293 06
- Website: www.bradlec.cz

Bradlec is a municipality and village in Mladá Boleslav District in the Central Bohemian Region of the Czech Republic. It has about 1,500 inhabitants.

== Etymology ==
The name is probably derived from the old Czech word bradlo, meaning 'rocky formation'.

== Geography ==
Bradlec is located about 3 kilometres (2 mi) north of Mladá Boleslav and 48 km (30 mi) northeast of Prague. It lies mostly in the Jičín Uplands, only a small part of the municipal territory extend into the Jizera Table. The highest point is at 309 m (1,014 ft) above sea level.

The municipality is located on an elevation of volcanic origin above the Jizera river valley. There are two small flooded quarries in the centre of Bradlec.

== History ==
The first written mention of Bradlec is from 1382. The village was founded by Knights Hospitaller around 1250.

== Demographics ==
Historical population

| Year | Pop. | ±% |
|---|---|---|
| 1869 | 147 | — |
| 1880 | 169 | +15.0% |
| 1890 | 163 | −3.6% |
| 1900 | 204 | +25.2% |
| 1910 | 316 | +54.9% |

| Year | Pop. | ±% |
|---|---|---|
| 1921 | 301 | −4.7% |
| 1930 | 319 | +6.0% |
| 1950 | 212 | −33.5% |
| 1961 | 244 | +15.1% |
| 1970 | 178 | −27.0% |

| Year | Pop. | ±% |
|---|---|---|
| 1980 | 207 | +16.3% |
| 1991 | 215 | +3.9% |
| 2001 | 437 | +103.3% |
| 2011 | 1,216 | +178.3% |
| 2021 | 1,372 | +12.8% |

Source: Censuses

== Transport ==
There are no railways or major roads passing through the municipality.

== Sights ==
There are no protected cultural monuments in the municipality. Among the cultural landmarks are a small chapel and a wayside cross.
