= Bílé Poličany =

- Municipality
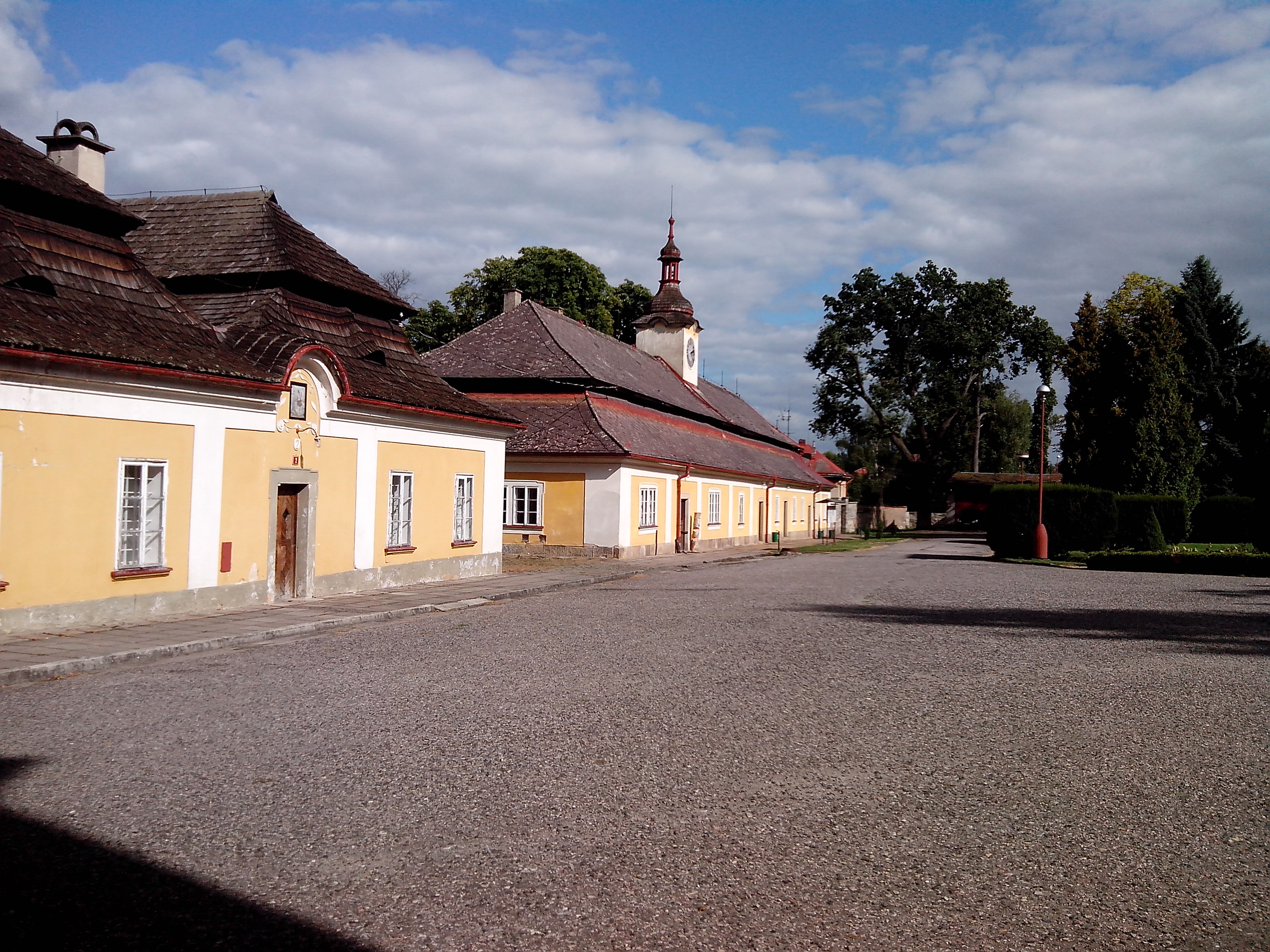
- Bílé Poličany Castle

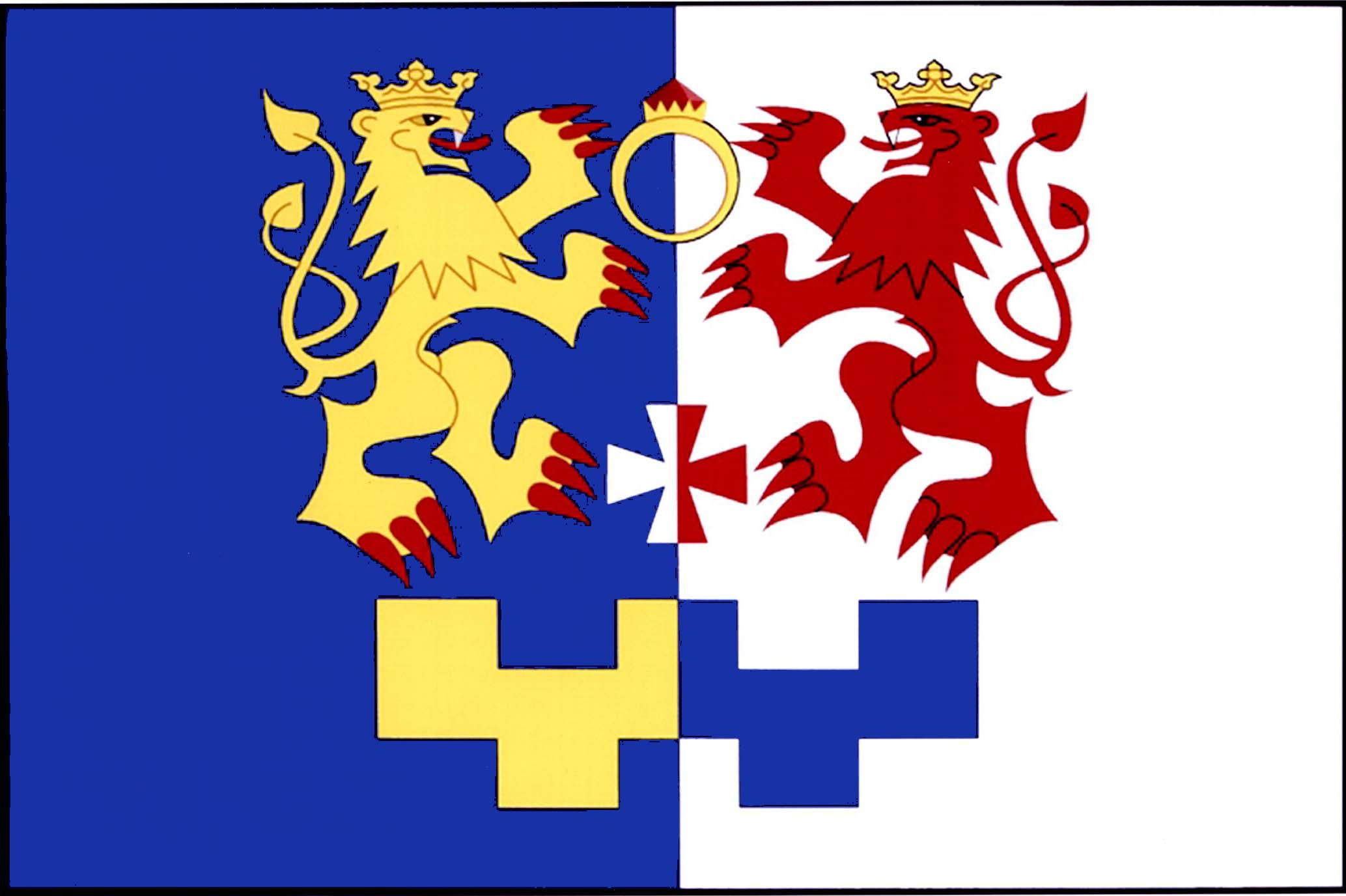
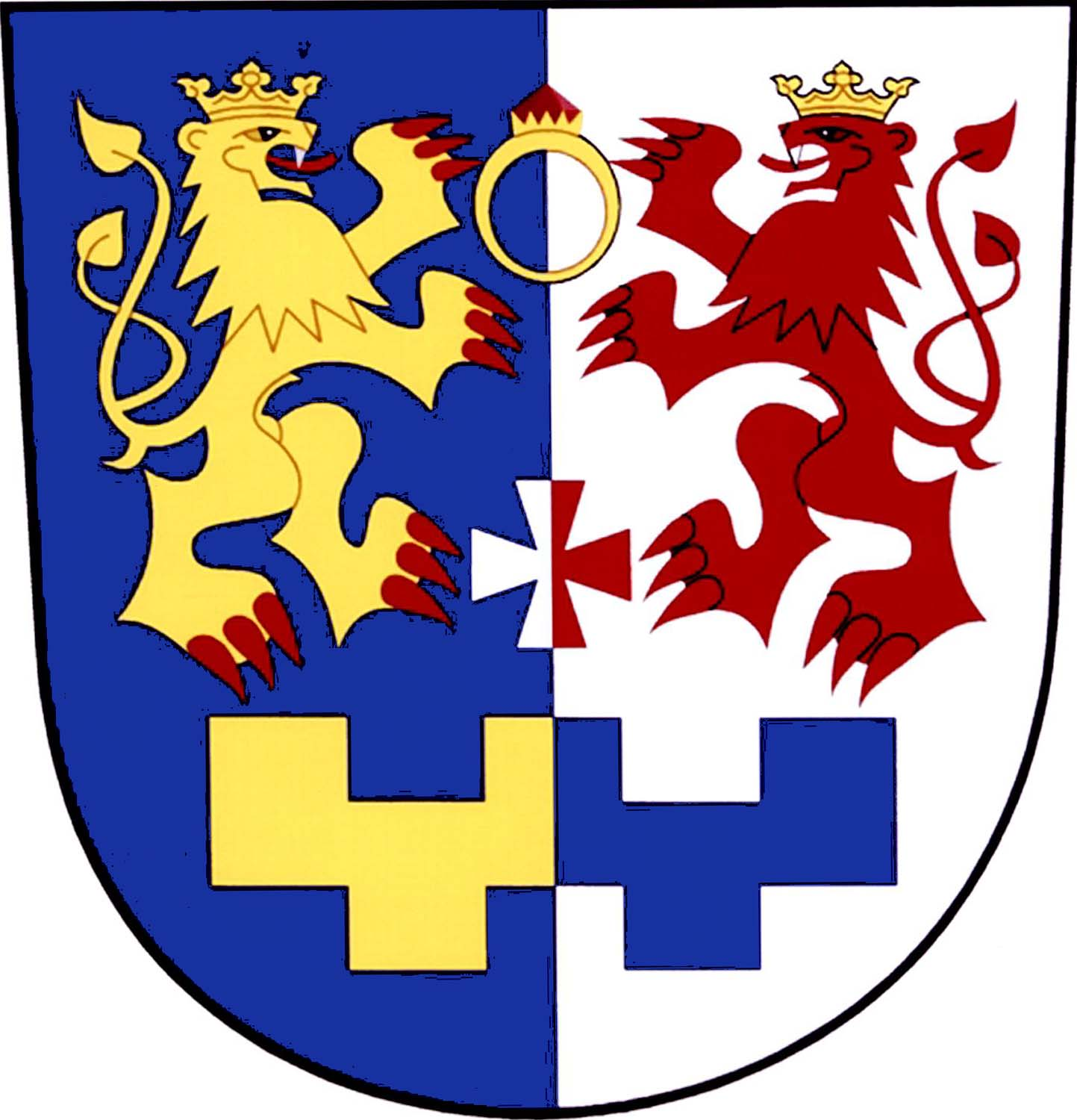
- Flag Coat of arms

- Location in the Czech Republic
- Coordinates: 50°23′27″N 15°43′55″E
- Country: Czech Republic
- Region: Hradec Králové
- District: Trutnov
- First mentioned: 1270

Area
  - Total: 5.37 km^{2} (2.07 sq mi)
- Elevation: 358 m (1,175 ft)

Population (2026-01-01)
  - Total: 164
  - Density: 30.5/km^{2} (79.1/sq mi)
- Time zone: UTC+1 (CET)
  - Summer (DST): UTC+2 (CEST)
- Postal code: 544 52
- Website: www.bilepolicany.cz

Bílé Poličany is a municipality and village in Trutnov District in the Hradec Králové Region of the Czech Republic. It has about 200 inhabitants.

== Demographics ==
Historical population
Year	Pop.	±%
1869	666	—
1880	687	+3.2%
1890	554	−19.4%
1900	517	−6.7%
1910	492	−4.8%
1921	454	−7.7%
1930	390	−14.1%
1950	329	−15.6%
1961	265	−19.5%
1970	245	−7.5%
1980	196	−20.0%
1991	162	−17.3%
2001	152	−6.2%
2011	146	−3.9%
2021	162	+11.0%
Source: Censuses
