= Hrádek (Ústí nad Orlicí District) =

- Municipality
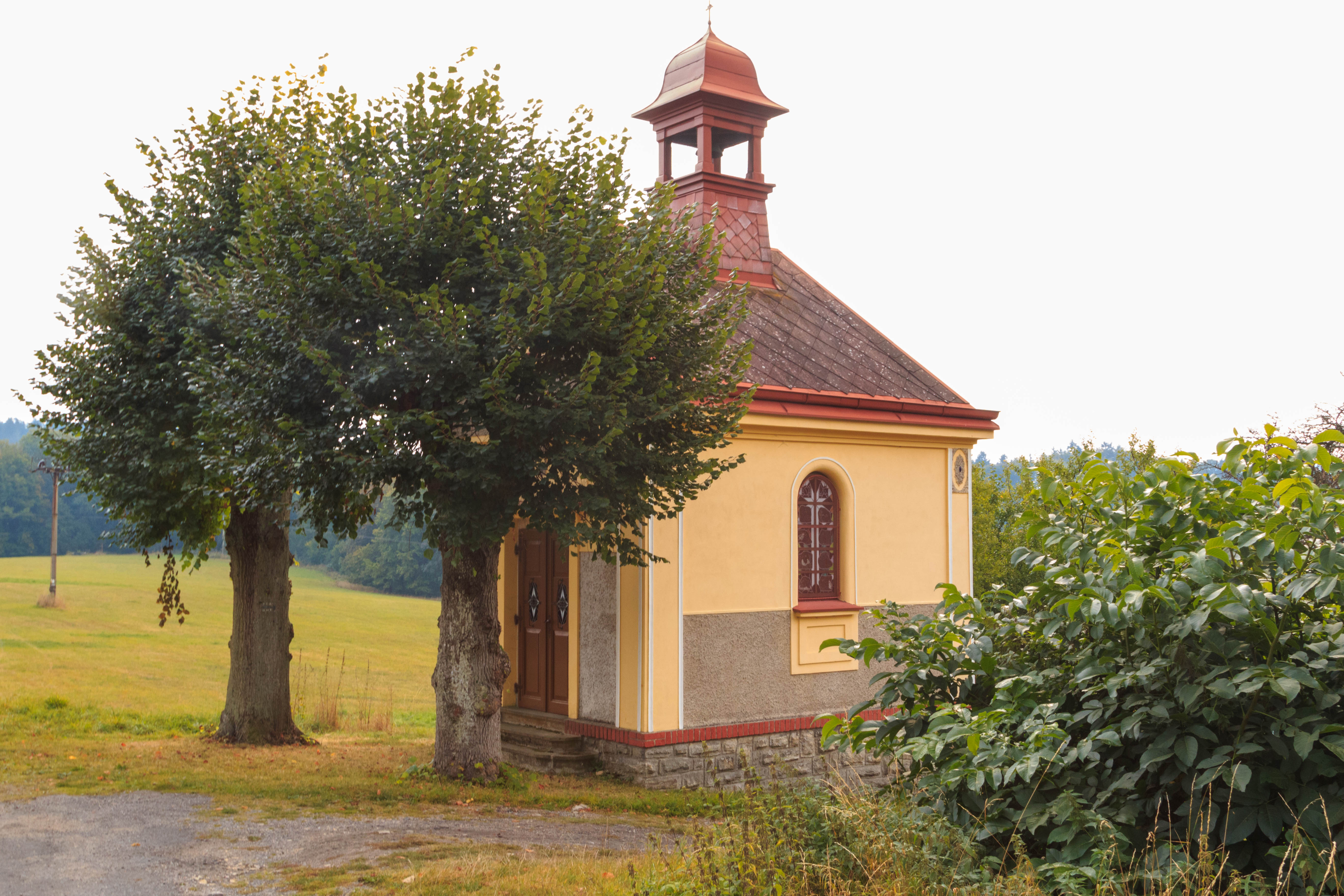
- Chapel

- Flag Coat of arms

- Location in the Czech Republic
- Coordinates: 49°58′6″N 16°20′18″E
- Country: Czech Republic
- Region: Pardubice
- District: Ústí nad Orlicí
- First mentioned: 1432

Area
  - Total: 1.00 km^{2} (0.39 sq mi)
- Elevation: 405 m (1,329 ft)

Population (2026-01-01)
  - Total: 95
  - Density: 95/km^{2} (250/sq mi)
- Time zone: UTC+1 (CET)
  - Summer (DST): UTC+2 (CEST)
- Postal code: 562 01
- Website: www.hradek-uo.cz

Hrádek is a municipality and village in Ústí nad Orlicí District in the Pardubice Region of the Czech Republic. It has about 100 inhabitants.

== Demographics ==
Historical population
Year	Pop.	±%
1869	197	—
1880	193	−2.0%
1890	226	+17.1%
1900	241	+6.6%
1910	222	−7.9%
1921	175	−21.2%
1930	170	−2.9%
1950	140	−17.6%
1961	134	−4.3%
1970	105	−21.6%
1980	91	−13.3%
1991	80	−12.1%
2001	90	+12.5%
2011	91	+1.1%
2021	103	+13.2%
Source: Censuses
