= Volanice =

- Municipality
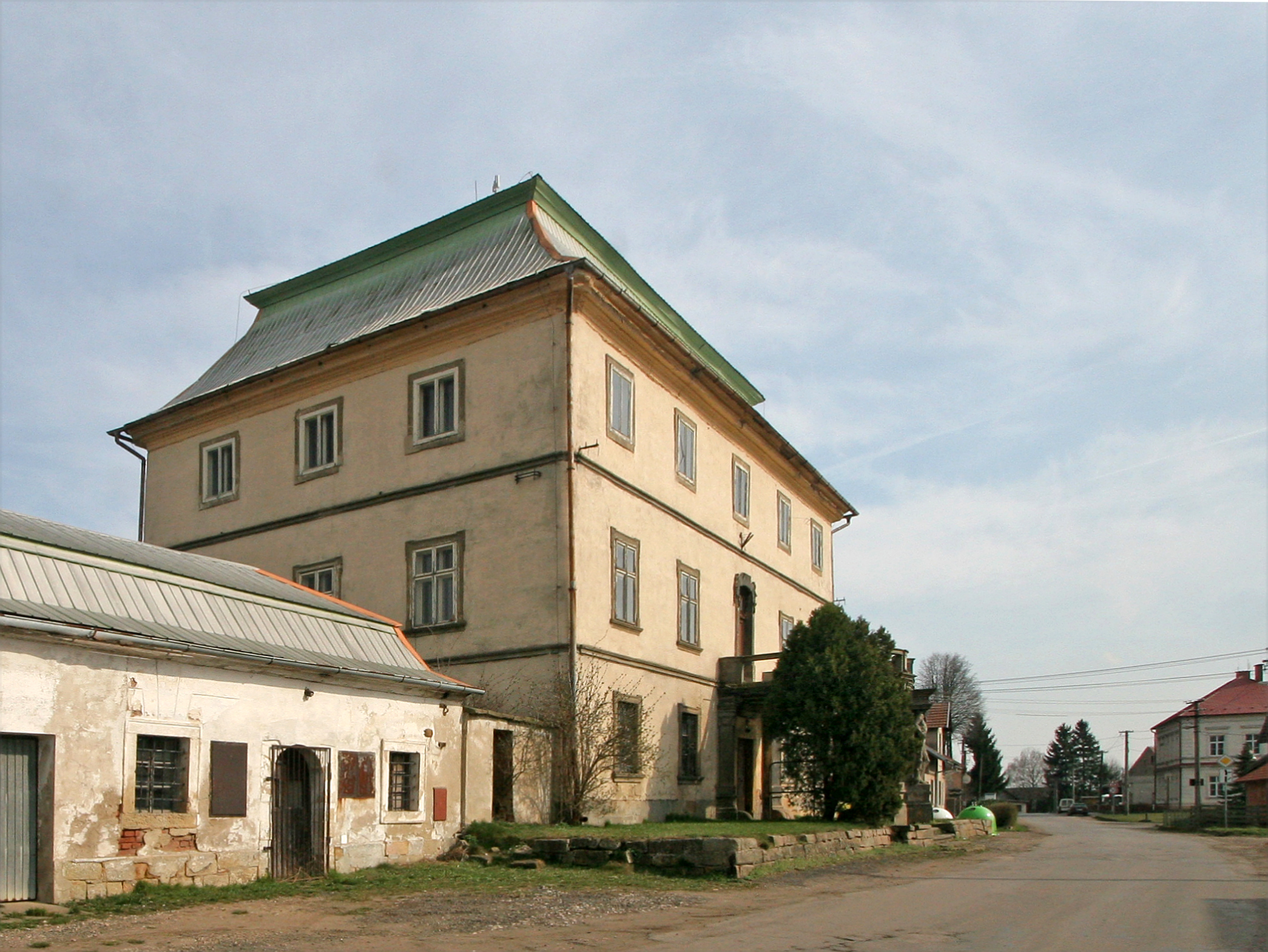
- Volanice Castle

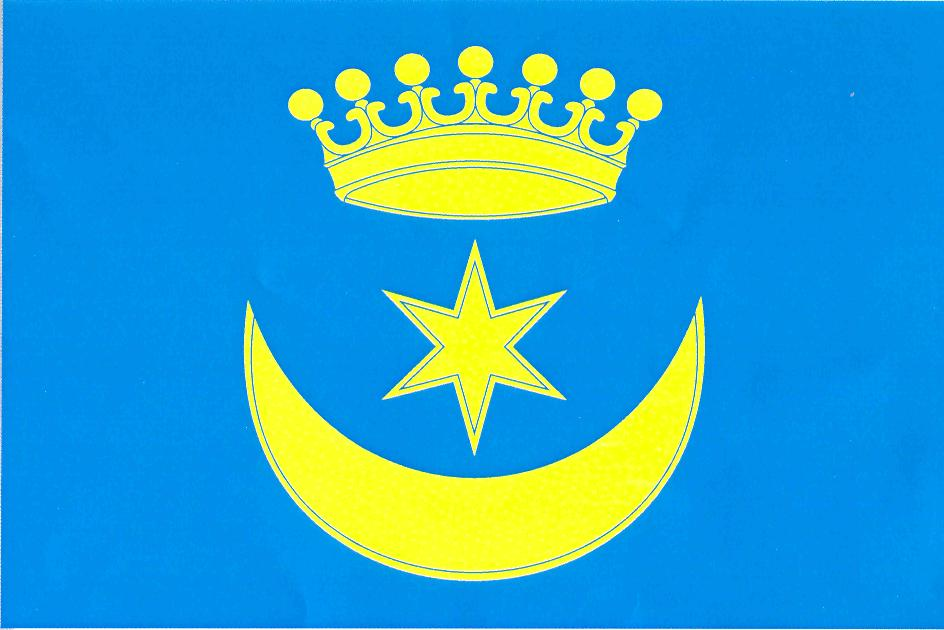
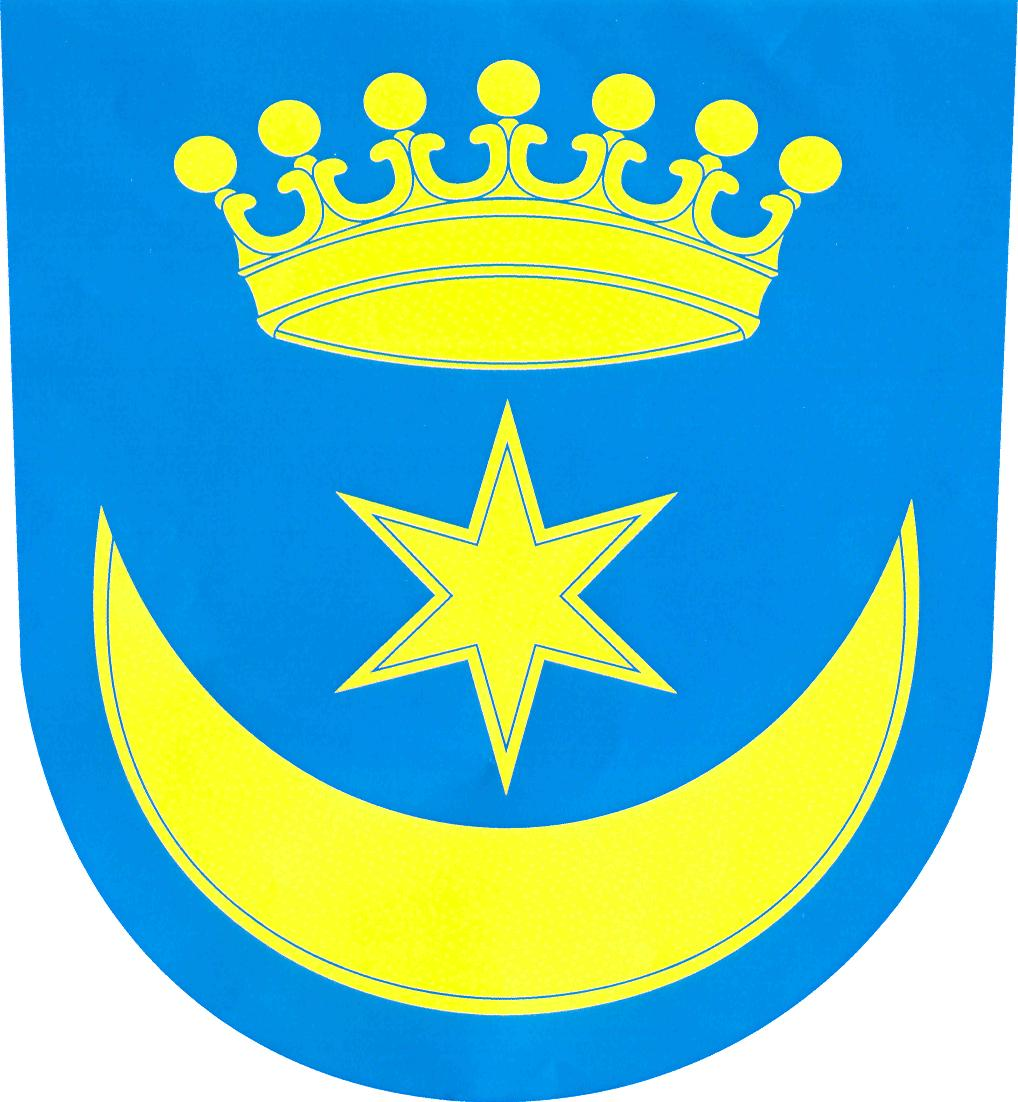
- Flag Coat of arms

- Location in the Czech Republic
- Coordinates: 50°20′8″N 15°23′54″E
- Country: Czech Republic
- Region: Hradec Králové
- District: Jičín
- First mentioned: 1325

Area
  - Total: 6.22 km^{2} (2.40 sq mi)
- Elevation: 250 m (820 ft)

Population (2026-01-01)
  - Total: 231
  - Density: 37.1/km^{2} (96.2/sq mi)
- Time zone: UTC+1 (CET)
  - Summer (DST): UTC+2 (CEST)
- Postal code: 507 03
- Website: www.volanice.cz

Volanice is a municipality and village in Jičín District in the Hradec Králové Region of the Czech Republic. It has about 200 inhabitants.

== Demographics ==
Historical population
Year	Pop.	±%
1869	775	—
1880	836	+7.9%
1890	743	−11.1%
1900	713	−4.0%
1910	695	−2.5%
1921	668	−3.9%
1930	639	−4.3%
1950	419	−34.4%
1961	397	−5.3%
1970	344	−13.4%
1980	336	−2.3%
1991	266	−20.8%
2001	236	−11.3%
2011	213	−9.7%
2021	232	+8.9%
Source: Censuses
