= Sobčice =

- Municipality
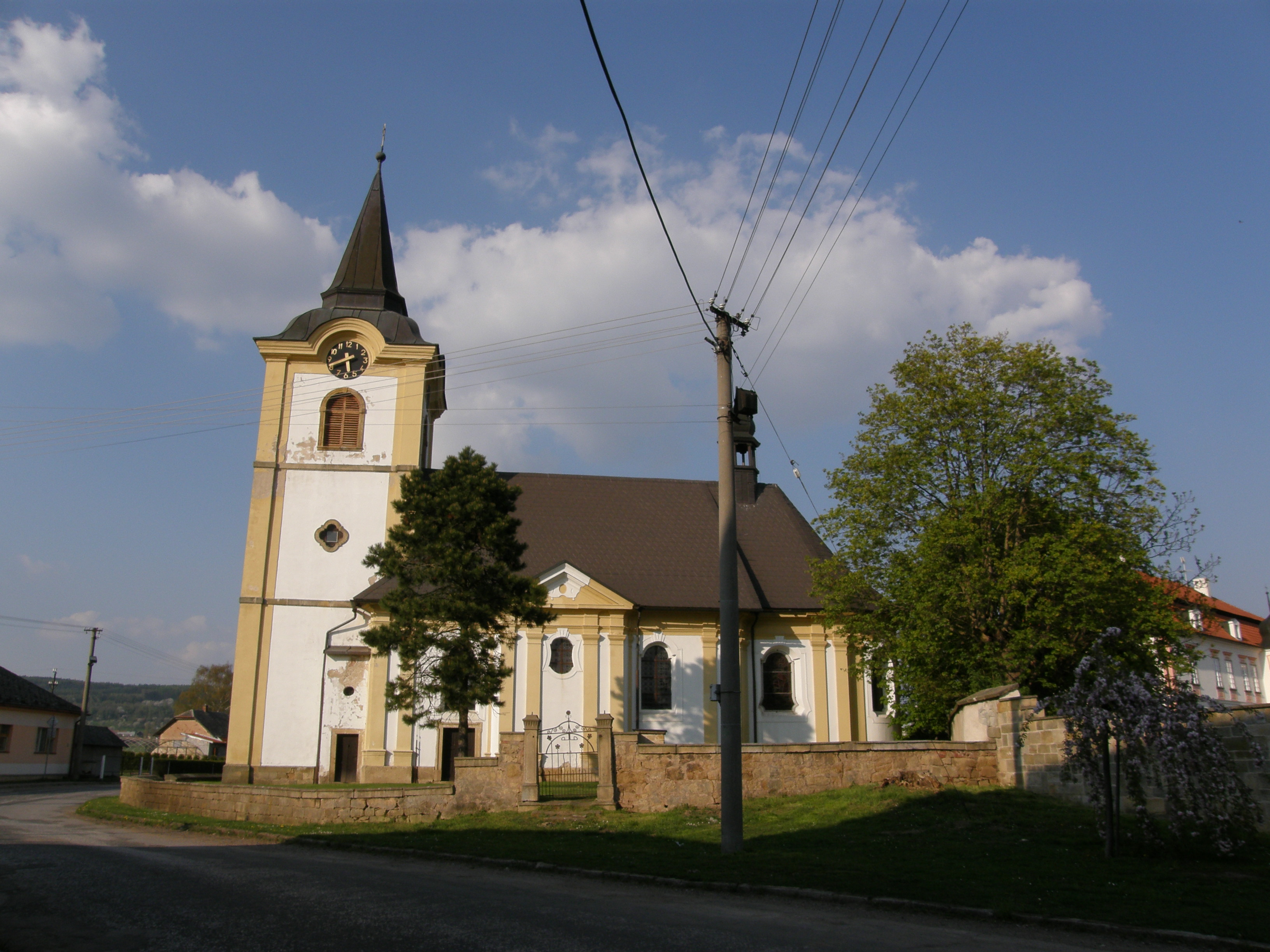
- Church of Saint Procopius

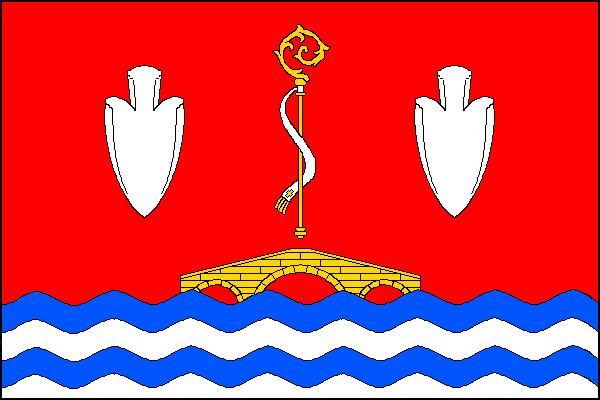
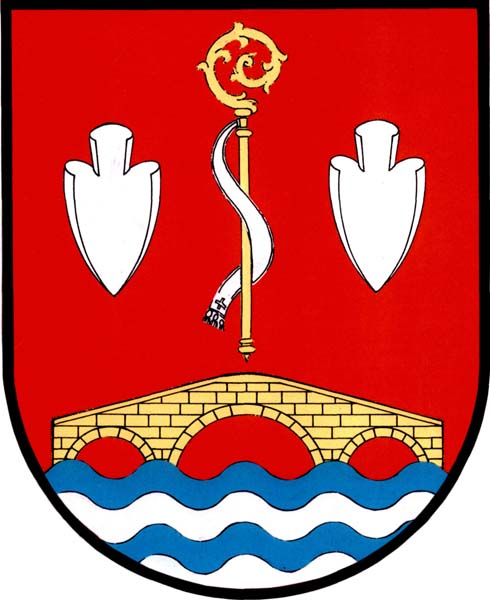
- Flag Coat of arms

- Location in the Czech Republic
- Coordinates: 50°22′20″N 15°30′54″E
- Country: Czech Republic
- Region: Hradec Králové
- District: Jičín
- First mentioned: 1281

Area
  - Total: 3.65 km^{2} (1.41 sq mi)
- Elevation: 252 m (827 ft)

Population (2026-01-01)
  - Total: 296
  - Density: 81.1/km^{2} (210/sq mi)
- Time zone: UTC+1 (CET)
  - Summer (DST): UTC+2 (CEST)
- Postal code: 508 01
- Website: sobcice.cz

Sobčice is a municipality and village in Jičín District in the Hradec Králové Region of the Czech Republic. It has about 300 inhabitants.

== Etymology ==
The name is derived from the personal name Sobek, meaning "the village of Sobek's people".

== Geography ==
Sobčice is located about 13 kilometres (8 mi) southeast of Jičín and 28 km (17 mi) northwest of Hradec Králové. It lies mostly in a flat agricultural landscape in the East Elbe Table. A small spur of the municipal territory in the north extends into the Jičín Uplands and includes the highest point of Sobčice at 287 m (942 ft) above sea level. The Javorka River flows through the municipality.

== History ==
The first written mention of Sobčice is from 1281. Until the 15th century, the village was owned by a local noble family who called themselves the Lords of Sobčice. After that it was a property of various other lesser nobles. In the mid-16th century, Sobčice was acquired by the Waldstein family through marriage. Anna Hasištejnská of Lobkowicz bought Sobčice in 1577, but soon sold it to the Dohalský of Dohalice family. In 1627, Albrecht von Wallenstein bought the village and had the new castle built in 1630–1634. He then gave Sobčice to the Dohalský family as a fief.

From 1661 until 1782, Sobčice was owned by the Carthusian monastery in Valdice. The monastery had built here a school and the village became a centre of education. The monastery was abolished in 1782 and Sobčice was acquired by the Trautmannsdorff family at auction in 1791. They owned the estate until 1945.

== Demographics ==
Historical population

Year	Pop.	±%
1869	727	—
1880	715	−1.7%
1890	704	−1.5%
1900	604	−14.2%
1910	576	−4.6%

Year	Pop.	±%
1921	566	−1.7%
1930	540	−4.6%
1950	380	−29.6%
1961	350	−7.9%
1970	323	−7.7%

Year	Pop.	±%
1980	313	−3.1%
1991	296	−5.4%
2001	282	−4.7%
2011	284	+0.7%
2021	286	+0.7%

Source: Censuses

== Transport ==
The I/35 road (the section from Hradec Králové to Jičín, part of the European route E442) runs through the northern part of the municipality.

Sobčice is located on the railway line Hradec Králové–Turnov.

== Sights ==
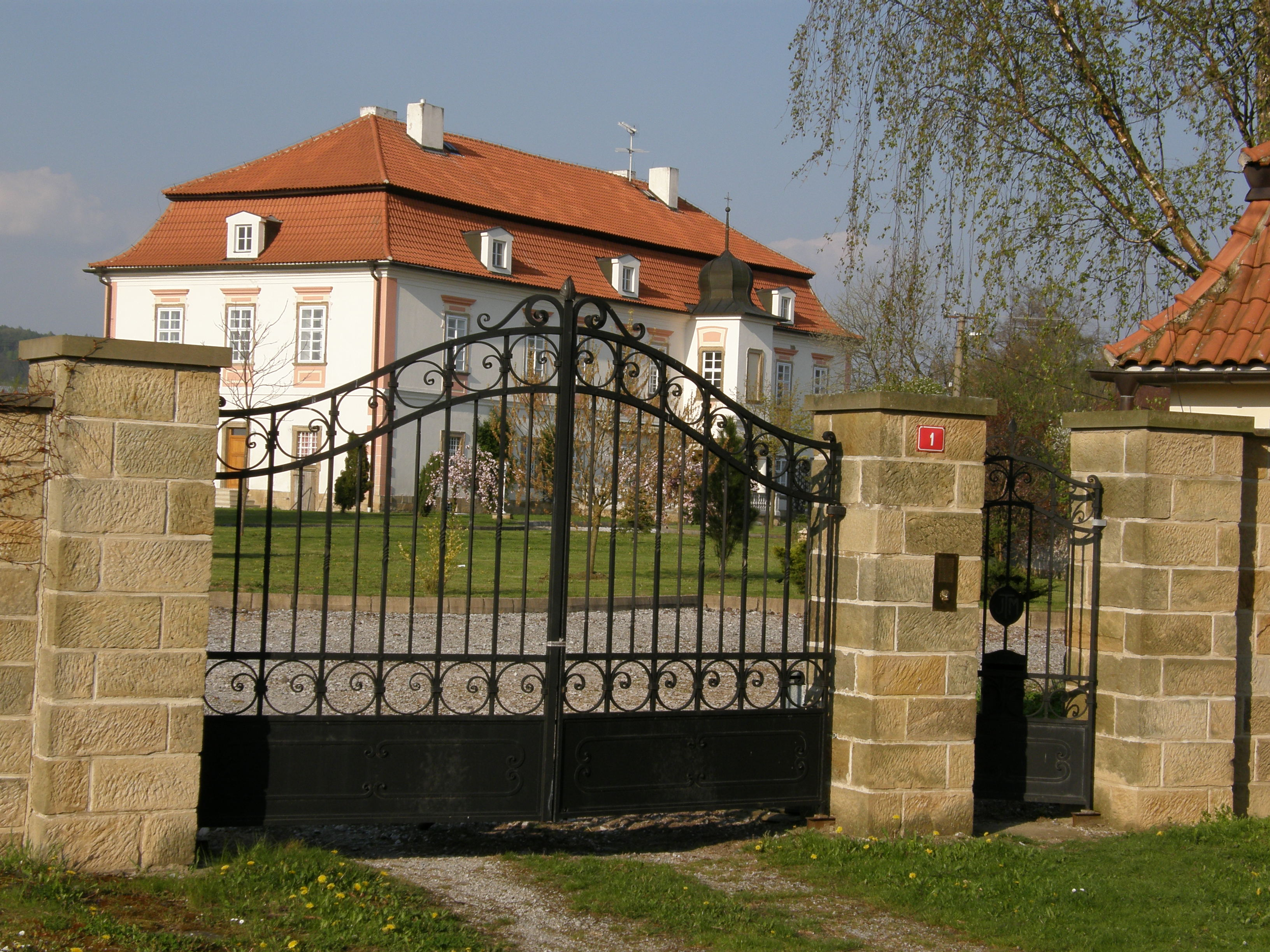
Sobčice Castle

The main landmark of Sobčice is the Church of Saint Procopius. It was built in the late Baroque style in 1761–1777.

The Sobčice Castle was built in the early Baroque style in 1630–1634 and modified in 1739. It was built on the site of a fortress that burned down in 1575. Today it is privately owned and inaccessible to the public.
