= Holovousy (Jičín District) =

- Municipality
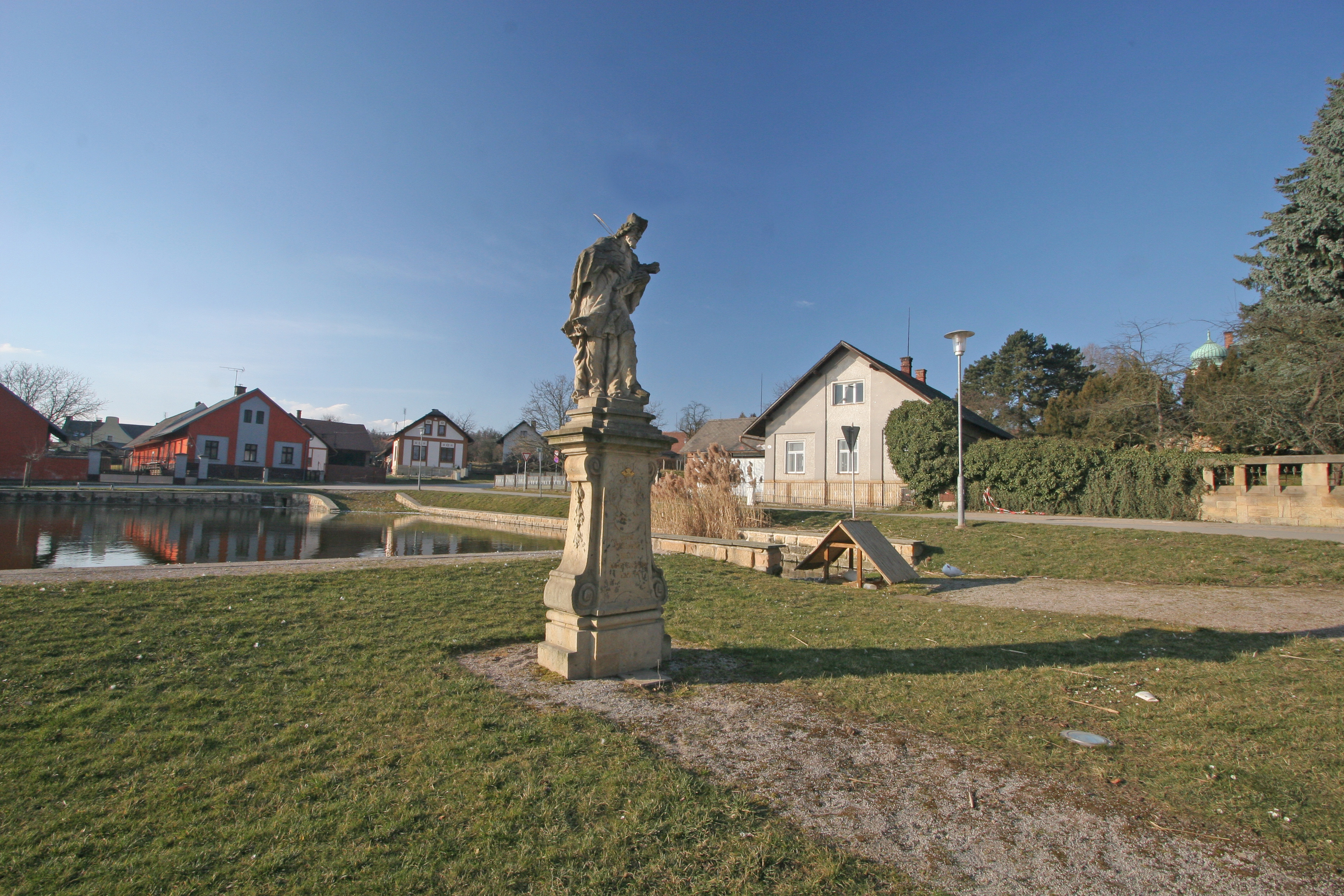
- Statue of Saint John of Nepomuk

- Flag Coat of arms

- Location in the Czech Republic
- Coordinates: 50°22′31″N 15°34′39″E
- Country: Czech Republic
- Region: Hradec Králové
- District: Jičín
- First mentioned: 1260

Area
  - Total: 9.30 km^{2} (3.59 sq mi)
- Elevation: 306 m (1,004 ft)

Population (2026-01-01)
  - Total: 559
  - Density: 60.1/km^{2} (156/sq mi)
- Time zone: UTC+1 (CET)
  - Summer (DST): UTC+2 (CEST)
- Postal code: 508 01
- Website: www.holovousy.cz//

Holovousy is a municipality and village in Jičín District in the Hradec Králové Region of the Czech Republic. It has about 600 inhabitants.

== Administrative division ==
Holovousy consists of four municipal parts (in brackets population according to the 2021 census):

- Holovousy (256)
- Chloumky (29)
- Chodovice (232)
- Dolní Mezihoří (1)

== Demographics ==
Historical population
Year	Pop.	±%
1869	797	—
1880	902	+13.2%
1890	896	−0.7%
1900	871	−2.8%
1910	872	+0.1%
1921	870	−0.2%
1930	840	−3.4%
1950	650	−22.6%
1961	608	−6.5%
1970	573	−5.8%
1980	560	−2.3%
1991	495	−11.6%
2001	471	−4.8%
2011	508	+7.9%
2021	518	+2.0%
Source: Censuses
