= Hrádek (Hradec Králové District) =

- Municipality
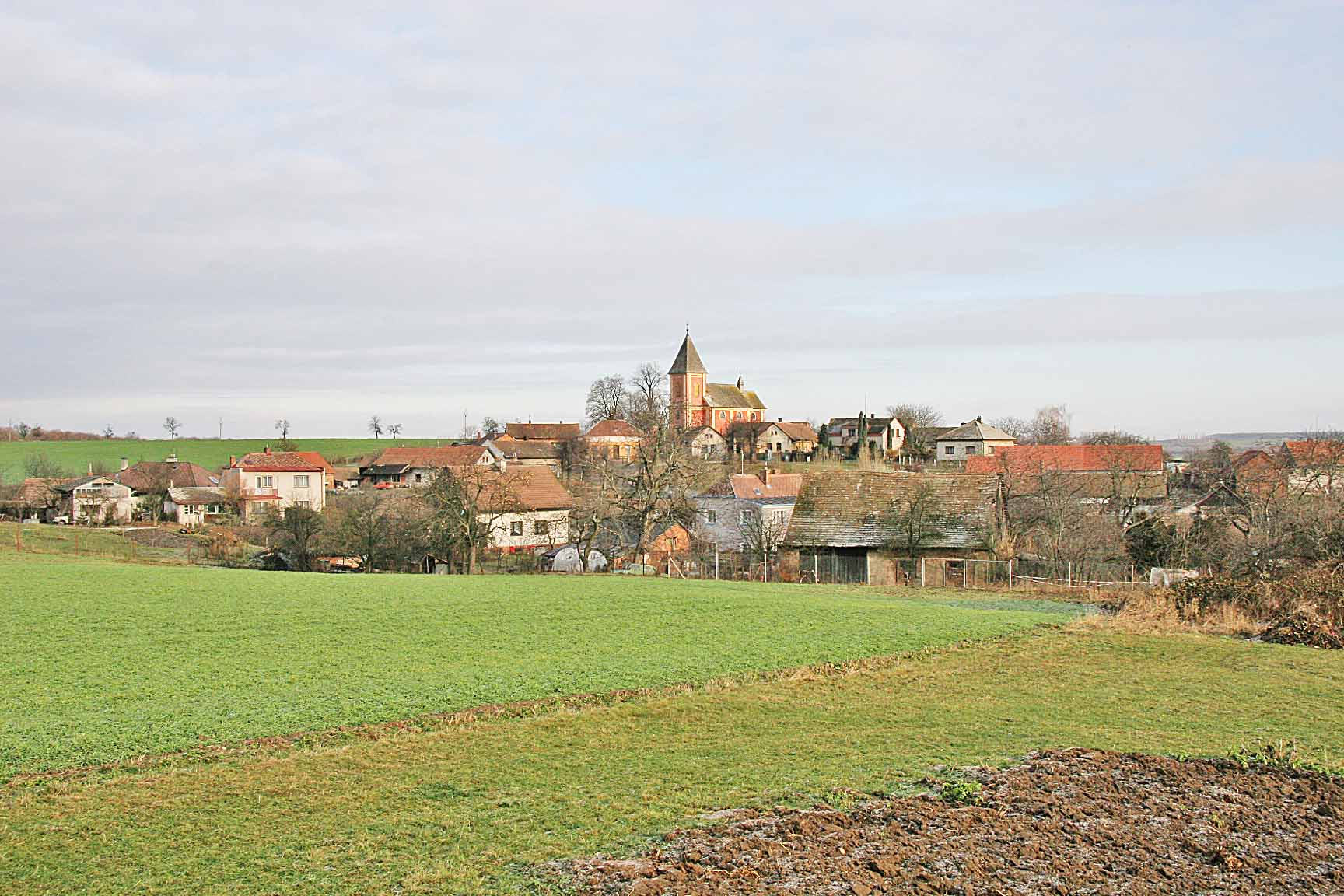
- General view

- Flag Coat of arms

- Location in the Czech Republic
- Coordinates: 50°13′24″N 15°40′2″E
- Country: Czech Republic
- Region: Hradec Králové
- District: Hradec Králové
- First mentioned: 1377

Area
  - Total: 2.76 km^{2} (1.07 sq mi)
- Elevation: 275 m (902 ft)

Population (2026-01-01)
  - Total: 184
  - Density: 66.7/km^{2} (173/sq mi)
- Time zone: UTC+1 (CET)
  - Summer (DST): UTC+2 (CEST)
- Postal code: 503 15
- Website: www.hradek-u-nechanic.cz

Hrádek is a municipality and village in Hradec Králové District in the Hradec Králové Region of the Czech Republic. It has about 200 inhabitants.

== Etymology ==
The Czech word hrádek (a diminutive of hrad) means 'small castle'.

== Geography ==
Hrádek is located about 10 kilometres (6 mi) west of Hradec Králové. It lies a flat landscape in the East Elbe Table. The highest point is at 292 m (958 ft) above sea level.

== History ==
The first written mention of Hrádek is from 1377. A fortress stood here until 1528.

== Demographics ==
Historical population

Year	Pop.	±%
1869	281	—
1880	279	−0.7%
1890	259	−7.2%
1900	288	+11.2%
1910	261	−9.4%

Year	Pop.	±%
1921	288	+10.3%
1930	254	−11.8%
1950	205	−19.3%
1961	205	+0.0%
1970	191	−6.8%

Year	Pop.	±%
1980	173	−9.4%
1991	172	−0.6%
2001	180	+4.7%
2011	188	+4.4%
2021	172	−8.5%

Source: Censuses

== Transport ==
There are no railways or major roads passing through the municipality.

== Sights ==
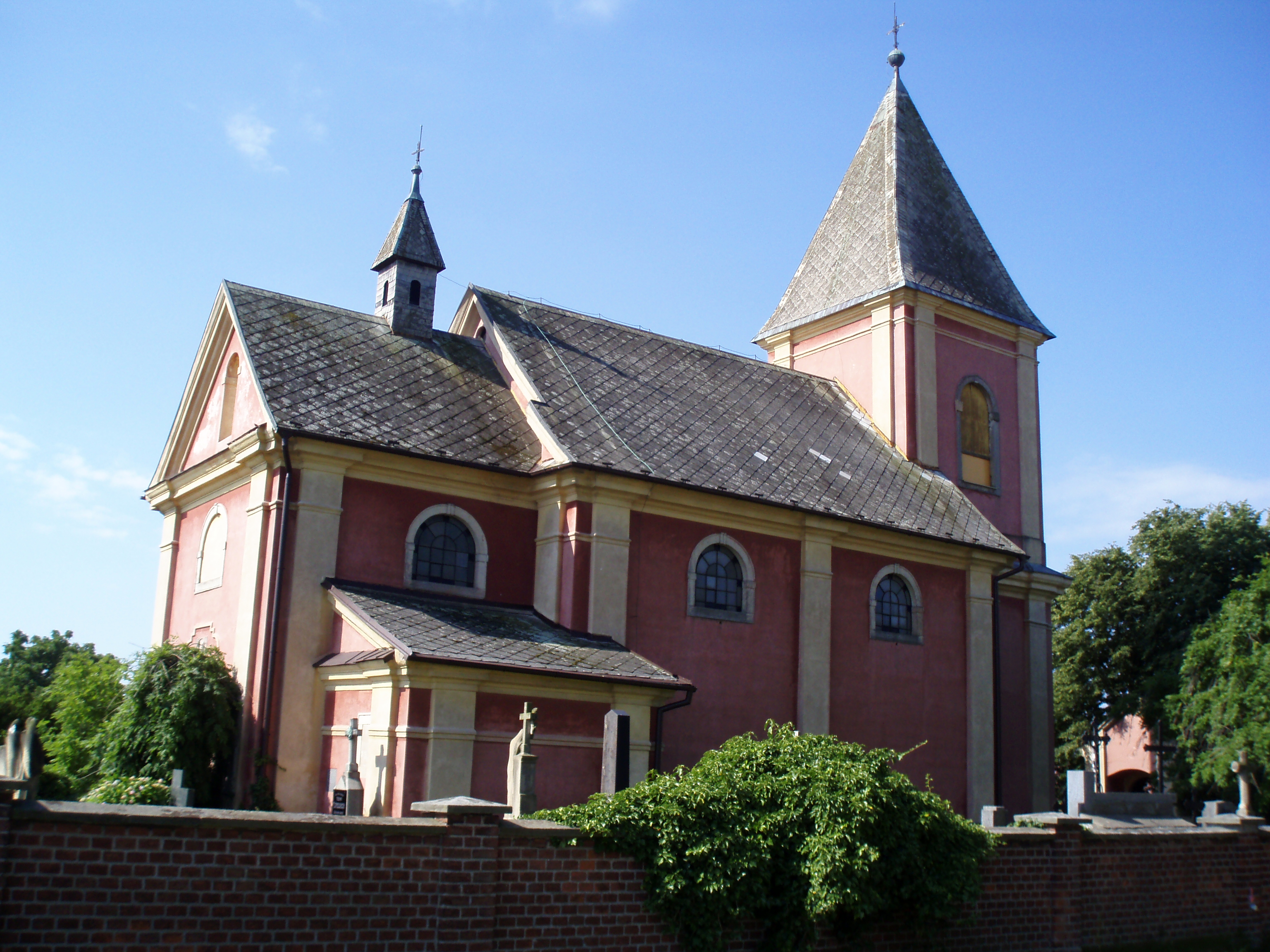
Church of Saint George

The main landmark of Hrádek is the Church of Saint George. It was built in 1692, after the old wooden church from the first half of the 14th century was destroyed during the Thirty Years' War.

The Hrádek u Nechanic Castle was built in the neo-Gothic style in 1839–1857, but despite its name and location in the vicinity of the village, it lies outside the municipal territory.
