= Syrovátka =

- Municipality
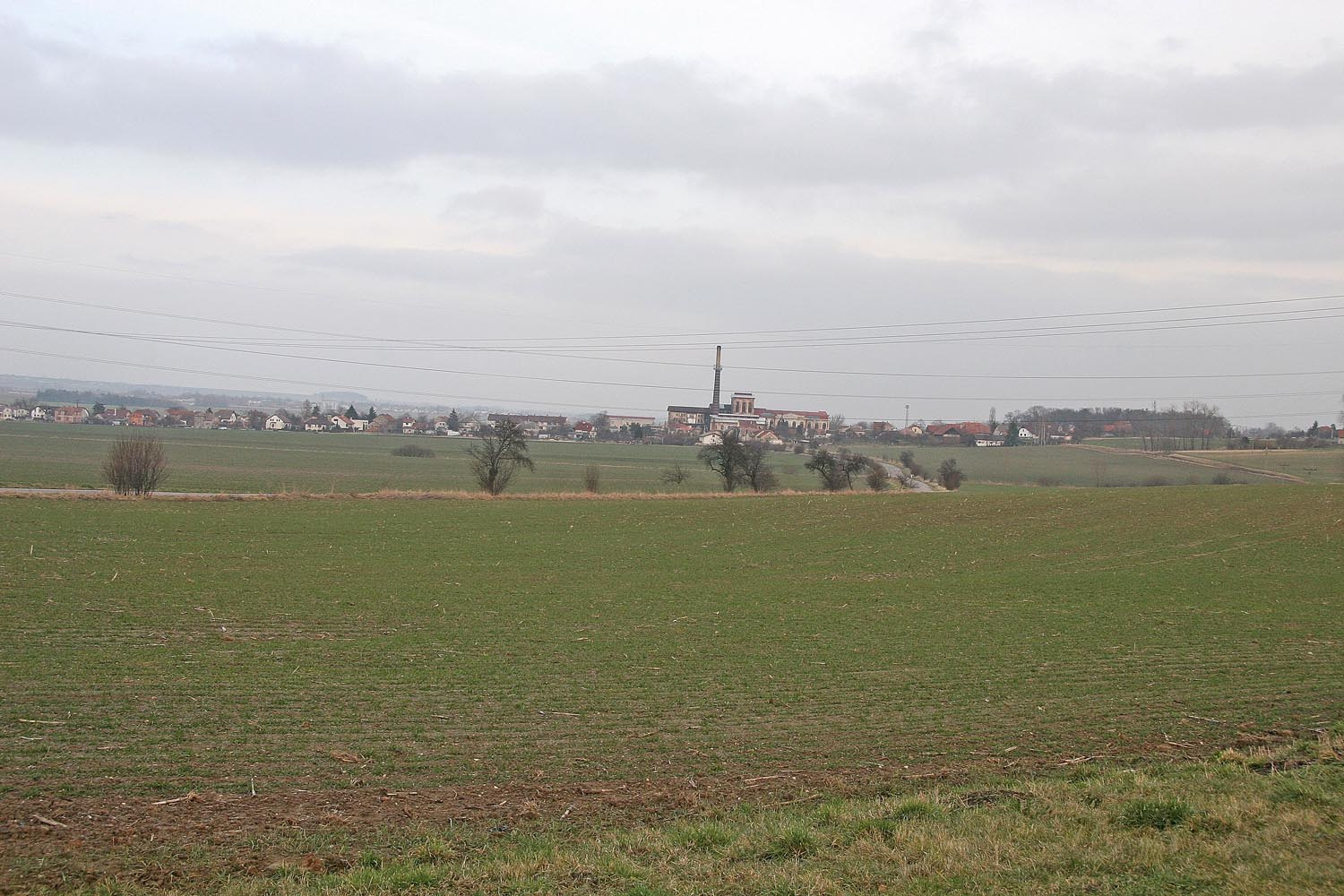
- View from the west

- Flag Coat of arms

- Location in the Czech Republic
- Coordinates: 50°9′17″N 15°39′46″E
- Country: Czech Republic
- Region: Hradec Králové
- District: Hradec Králové
- First mentioned: 1339

Area
  - Total: 1.83 km^{2} (0.71 sq mi)
- Elevation: 257 m (843 ft)

Population (2026-01-01)
  - Total: 467
  - Density: 255/km^{2} (661/sq mi)
- Time zone: UTC+1 (CET)
  - Summer (DST): UTC+2 (CEST)
- Postal code: 503 27
- Website: www.syrovatka.cz

Syrovátka is a municipality and village in Hradec Králové District in the Hradec Králové Region of the Czech Republic. It has about 500 inhabitants.

== Demographics ==
Historical population
Year	Pop.	±%
1869	354	—
1880	385	+8.8%
1890	384	−0.3%
1900	366	−4.7%
1910	364	−0.5%
1921	346	−4.9%
1930	434	+25.4%
1950	372	−14.3%
1961	429	+15.3%
1970	432	+0.7%
1980	387	−10.4%
1991	339	−12.4%
2001	383	+13.0%
2011	398	+3.9%
2021	424	+6.5%
Source: Censuses
