= Jičíněves =

- Municipality
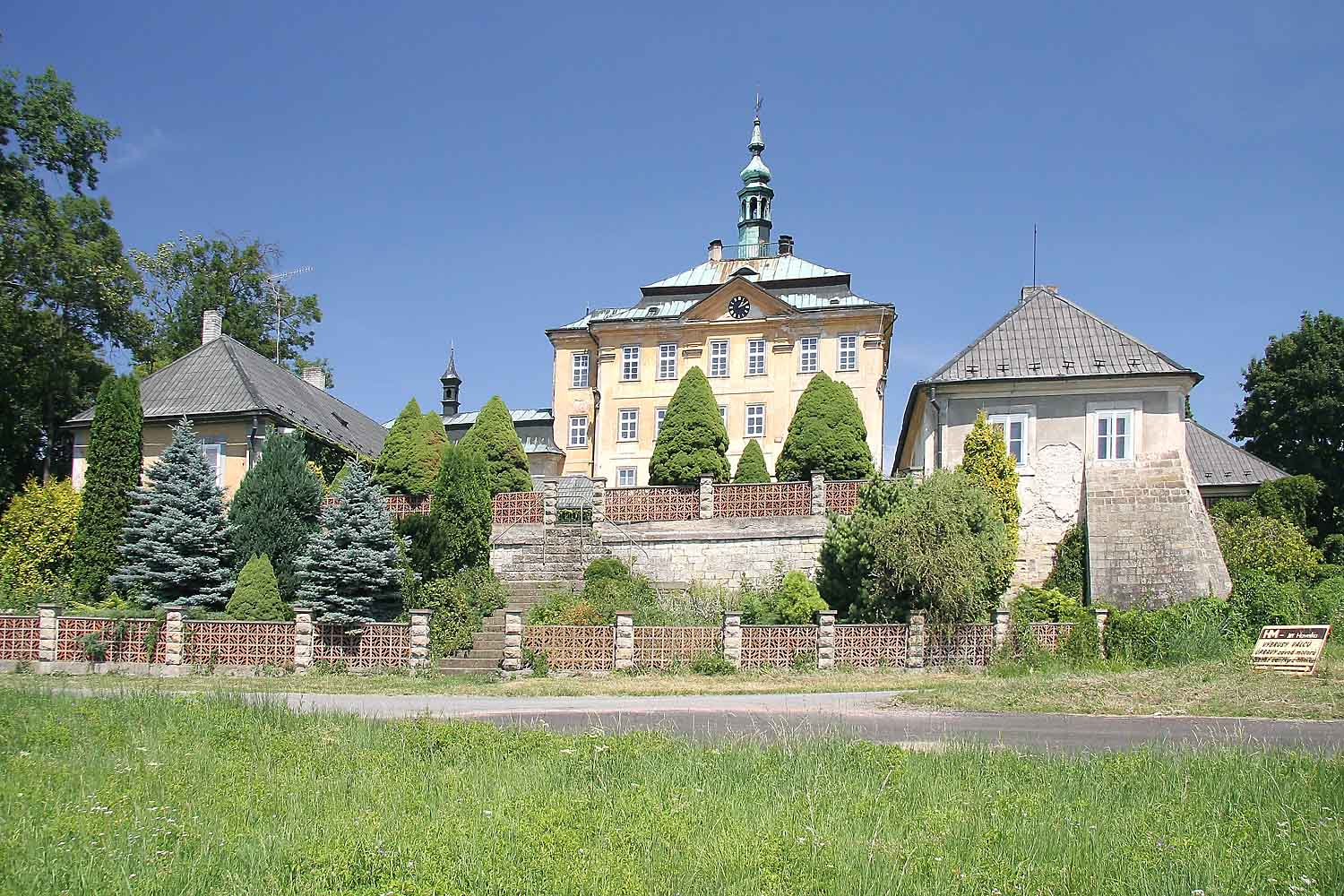
- Jičíněves Castle

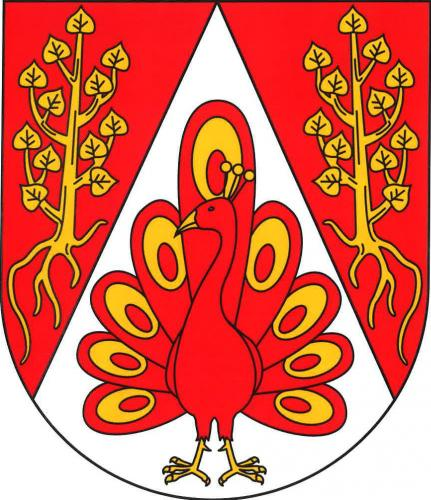
- Coat of arms

- Location in the Czech Republic
- Coordinates: 50°22′23″N 15°20′15″E
- Country: Czech Republic
- Region: Hradec Králové
- District: Jičín
- First mentioned: 1366

Area
  - Total: 16.97 km^{2} (6.55 sq mi)
- Elevation: 254 m (833 ft)

Population (2026-01-01)
  - Total: 661
  - Density: 39.0/km^{2} (101/sq mi)
- Time zone: UTC+1 (CET)
  - Summer (DST): UTC+2 (CEST)
- Postal codes: 506 01, 507 31, 507 33
- Website: www.jicineves.cz

Jičíněves (Czech pronunciation: [ˈjɪtʃiːɲɛvɛs]) is a municipality and village in Jičín District in the Hradec Králové Region of the Czech Republic. It has about 700 inhabitants.

== Administrative division ==
Jičíněves consists of six municipal parts (in brackets population according to the 2021 census):

- Jičíněves (343)
- Bartoušov (76)
- Dolany (40)
- Keteň (44)
- Labouň (34)
- Žitětín (55)

== Demographics ==
Historical population
Year	Pop.	±%
1869	1,380	—
1880	1,463	+6.0%
1890	1,616	+10.5%
1900	1,565	−3.2%
1910	1,544	−1.3%
1921	1,497	−3.0%
1930	1,388	−7.3%
1950	1,118	−19.5%
1961	992	−11.3%
1970	885	−10.8%
1980	745	−15.8%
1991	656	−11.9%
2001	583	−11.1%
2011	560	−3.9%
2021	592	+5.7%
Source: Censuses
