= Chvalkovice (Náchod District) =

- Municipality
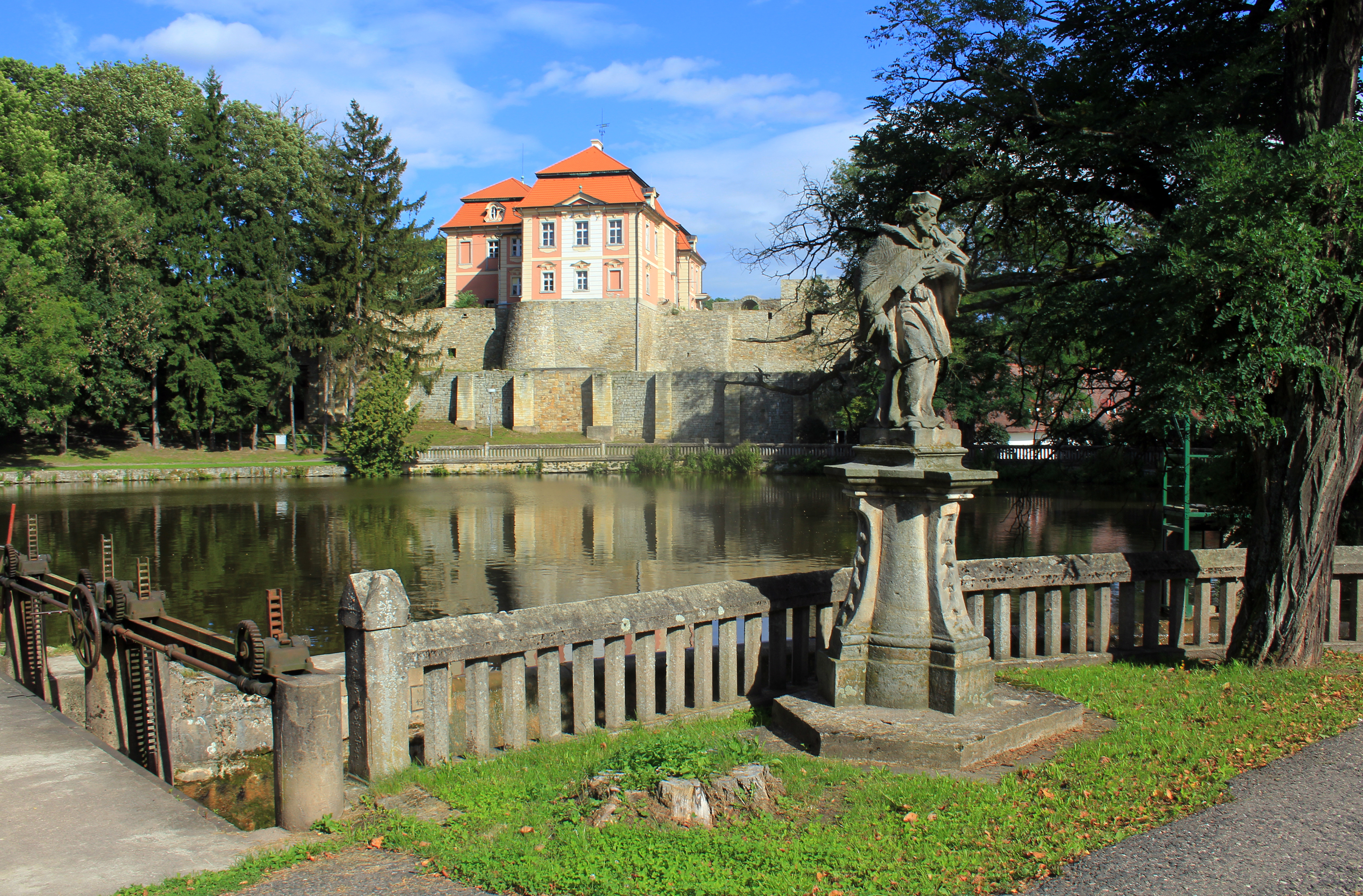
- Chvalkovice Castle

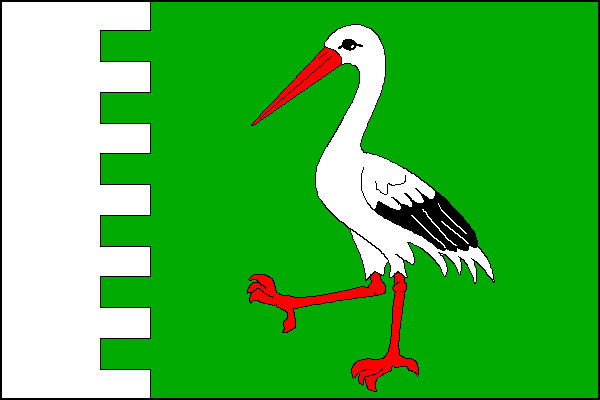
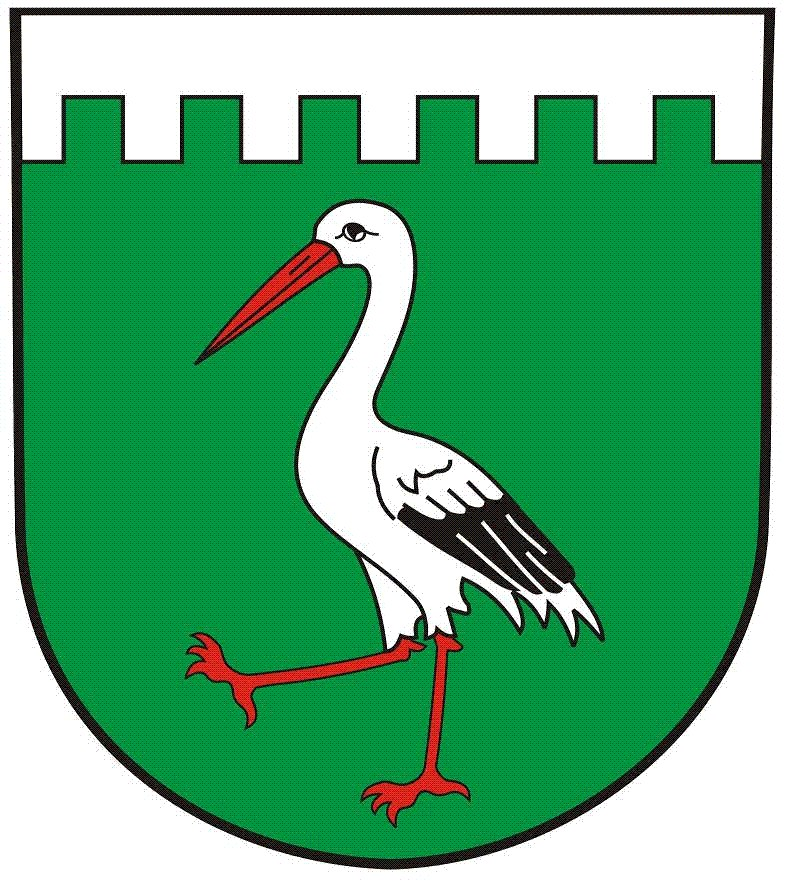
- Flag Coat of arms

- Location in the Czech Republic
- Coordinates: 50°24′52″N 15°58′42″E
- Country: Czech Republic
- Region: Hradec Králové
- District: Náchod
- First mentioned: 1350

Area
  - Total: 12.30 km^{2} (4.75 sq mi)
- Elevation: 306 m (1,004 ft)

Population (2026-01-01)
  - Total: 818
  - Density: 66.5/km^{2} (172/sq mi)
- Time zone: UTC+1 (CET)
  - Summer (DST): UTC+2 (CEST)
- Postal code: 552 04
- Website: www.chvalkovice.cz

Chvalkovice is a municipality and village in Náchod District in the Hradec Králové Region of the Czech Republic. It has about 800 inhabitants.

== Administrative division ==
Chvalkovice consists of seven municipal parts (in brackets population according to the 2021 census):

- Chvalkovice (382)
- Kopaniny (24)
- Malá Bukovina (22)
- Miskolezy (148)
- Střeziměřice (30)
- Velká Bukovina (105)
- Výhled (37)

== Demographics ==
Historical population
Year	Pop.	±%
1869	2,097	—
1880	1,907	−9.1%
1890	1,733	−9.1%
1900	1,781	+2.8%
1910	1,790	+0.5%
1921	1,558	−13.0%
1930	1,487	−4.6%
1950	959	−35.5%
1961	914	−4.7%
1970	809	−11.5%
1980	763	−5.7%
1991	637	−16.5%
2001	630	−1.1%
2011	666	+5.7%
2021	748	+12.3%
Source: Censuses
