= Třibřichy =

- Municipality
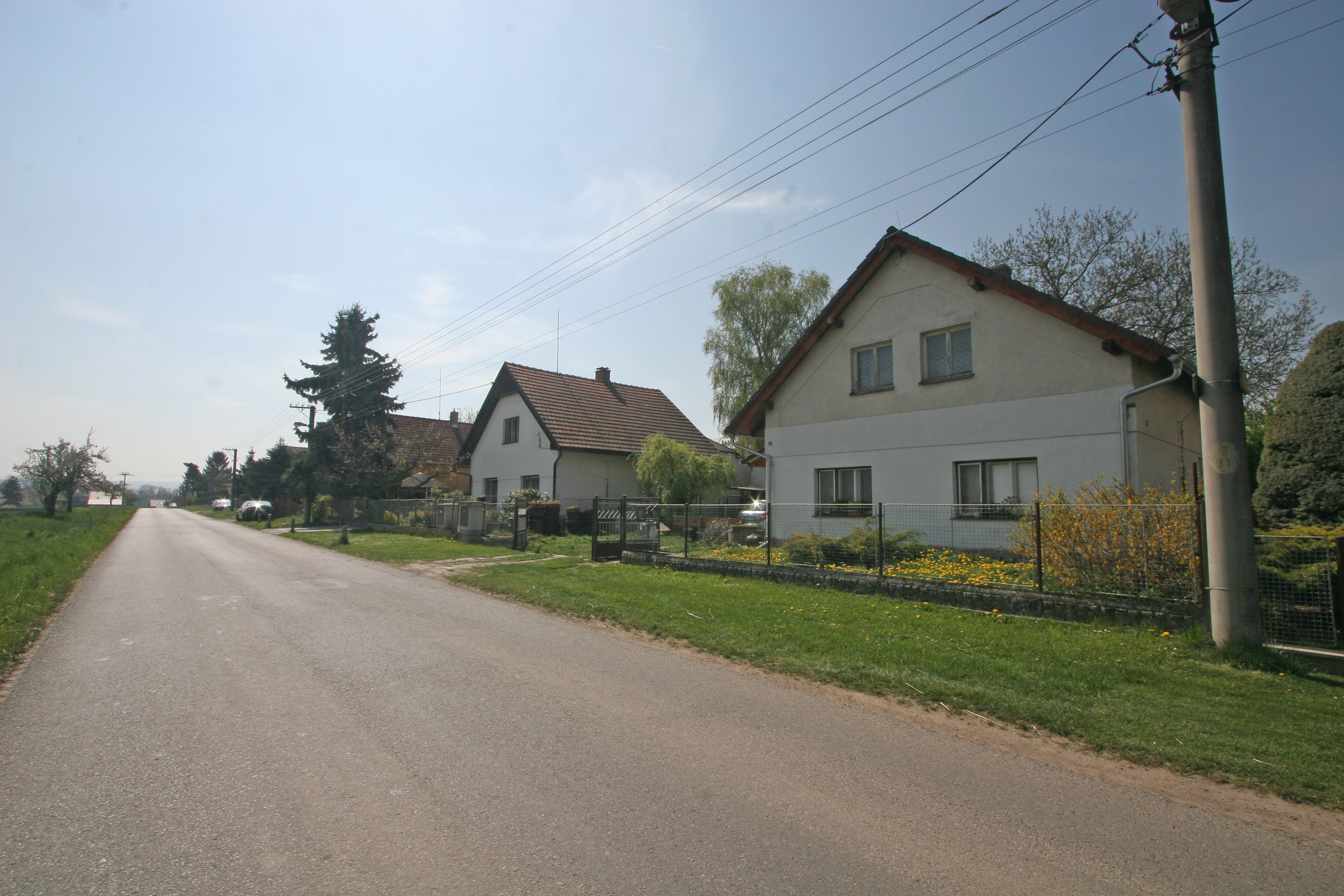
- Northern part of Třibřichy

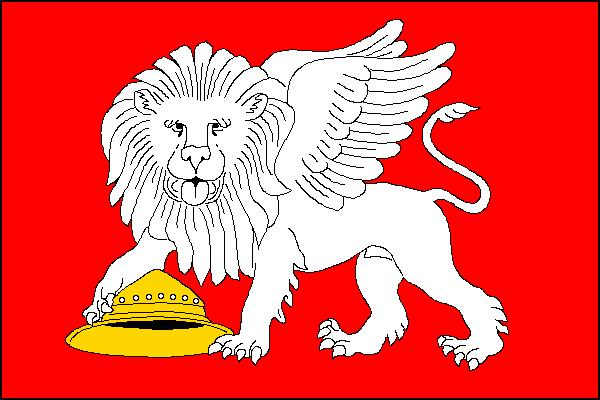
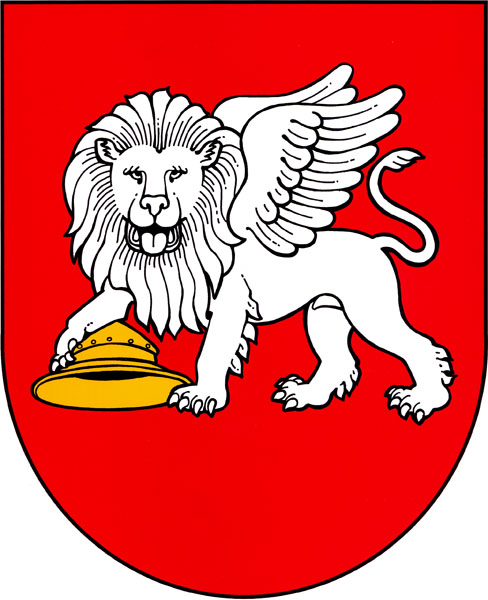
- Flag Coat of arms

- Location in the Czech Republic
- Coordinates: 49°57′55″N 15°44′21″E
- Country: Czech Republic
- Region: Pardubice
- District: Chrudim
- First mentioned: 1415

Area
  - Total: 4.15 km^{2} (1.60 sq mi)
- Elevation: 253 m (830 ft)

Population (2026-01-01)
  - Total: 277
  - Density: 66.7/km^{2} (173/sq mi)
- Time zone: UTC+1 (CET)
  - Summer (DST): UTC+2 (CEST)
- Postal code: 537 01
- Website: obectribrichy.cz

Třibřichy is a municipality and village in Chrudim District in the Pardubice Region of the Czech Republic. It has about 300 inhabitants.

== Demographics ==
Historical population
Year	Pop.	±%
1869	429	—
1880	407	−5.1%
1890	437	+7.4%
1900	492	+12.6%
1910	489	−0.6%
1921	455	−7.0%
1930	494	+8.6%
1950	338	−31.6%
1961	340	+0.6%
1970	331	−2.6%
1980	304	−8.2%
1991	270	−11.2%
2001	285	+5.6%
2011	274	−3.9%
2021	299	+9.1%
Source: Censuses
