= Hošťalovice =

- Municipality
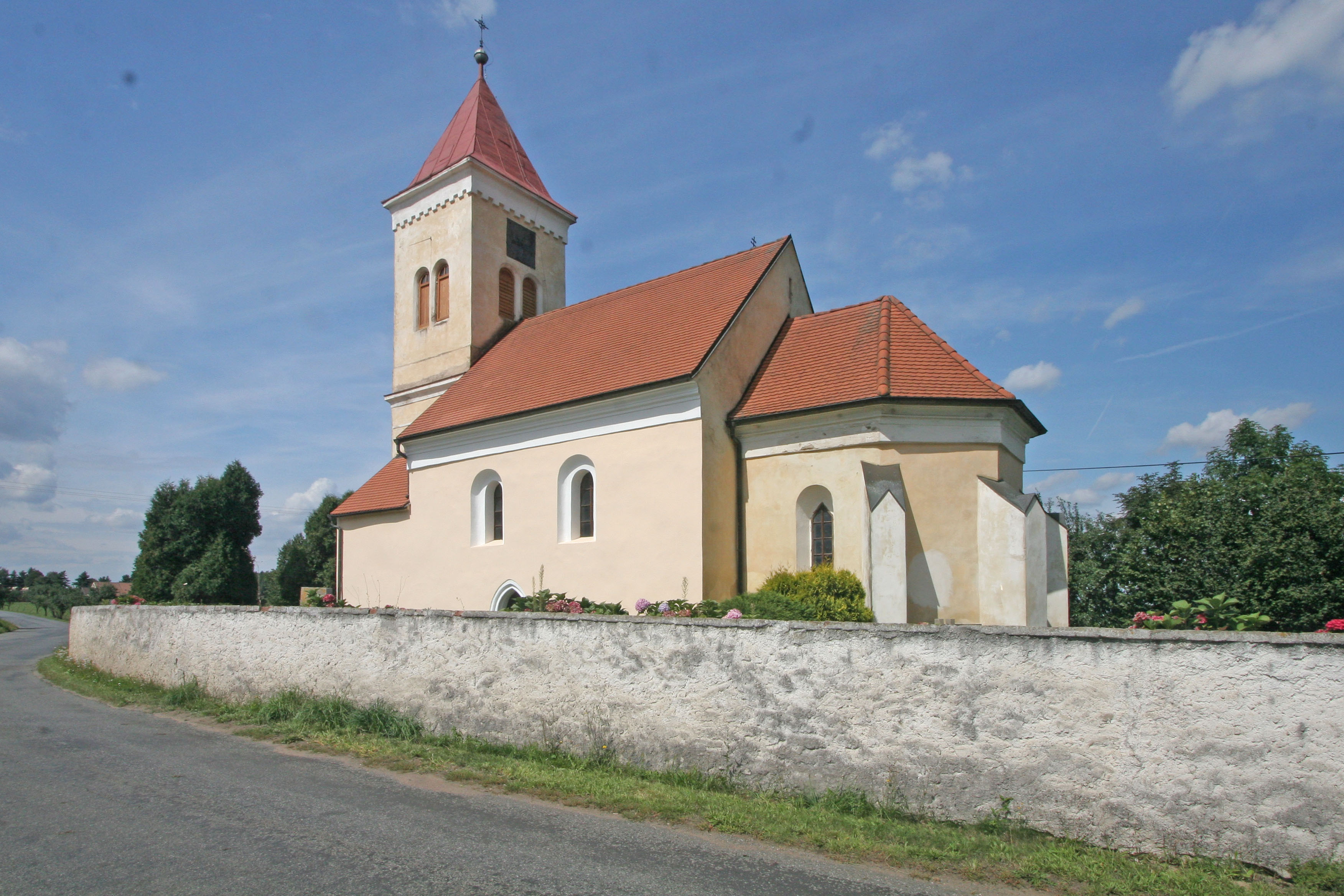
- Church of Saint Gall

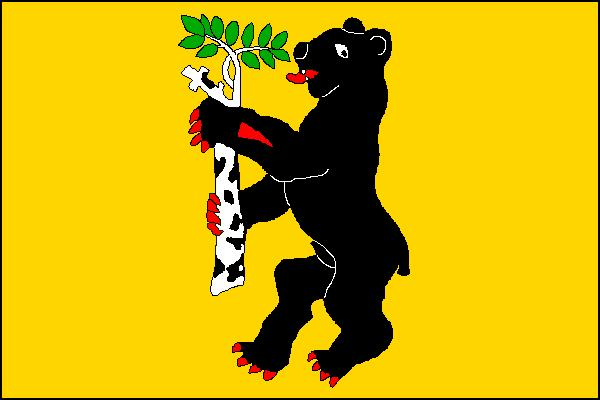
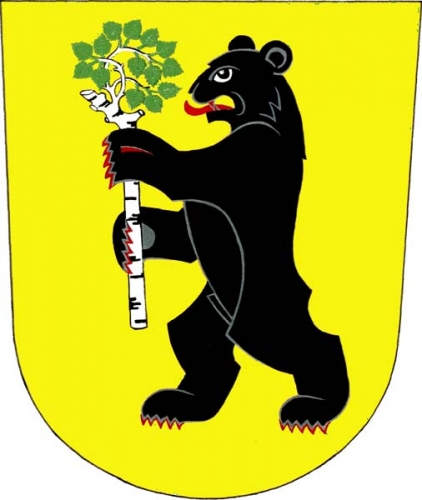
- Flag Coat of arms

- Location in the Czech Republic
- Coordinates: 49°56′5″N 15°34′34″E
- Country: Czech Republic
- Region: Pardubice
- District: Chrudim
- First mentioned: 1349

Area
  - Total: 4.50 km^{2} (1.74 sq mi)
- Elevation: 412 m (1,352 ft)

Population (2026-01-01)
  - Total: 145
  - Density: 32.2/km^{2} (83.5/sq mi)
- Time zone: UTC+1 (CET)
  - Summer (DST): UTC+2 (CEST)
- Postal code: 538 03
- Website: www.hostalovice.cz

Hošťalovice is a municipality and village in Chrudim District in the Pardubice Region of the Czech Republic. It has about 100 inhabitants.

== Administrative division ==
Hošťalovice consists of two municipal parts (in brackets population according to the 2021 census):

- Hošťalovice (117)
- Březinka (26)

== Demographics ==
Historical population
Year	Pop.	±%
1869	219	—
1880	238	+8.7%
1890	258	+8.4%
1900	282	+9.3%
1910	328	+16.3%
1921	323	−1.5%
1930	306	−5.3%
1950	257	−16.0%
1961	251	−2.3%
1970	246	−2.0%
1980	195	−20.7%
1991	151	−22.6%
2001	134	−11.3%
2011	141	+5.2%
2021	143	+1.4%
Source: Censuses
