= Prosetín (Chrudim District) =

- Municipality
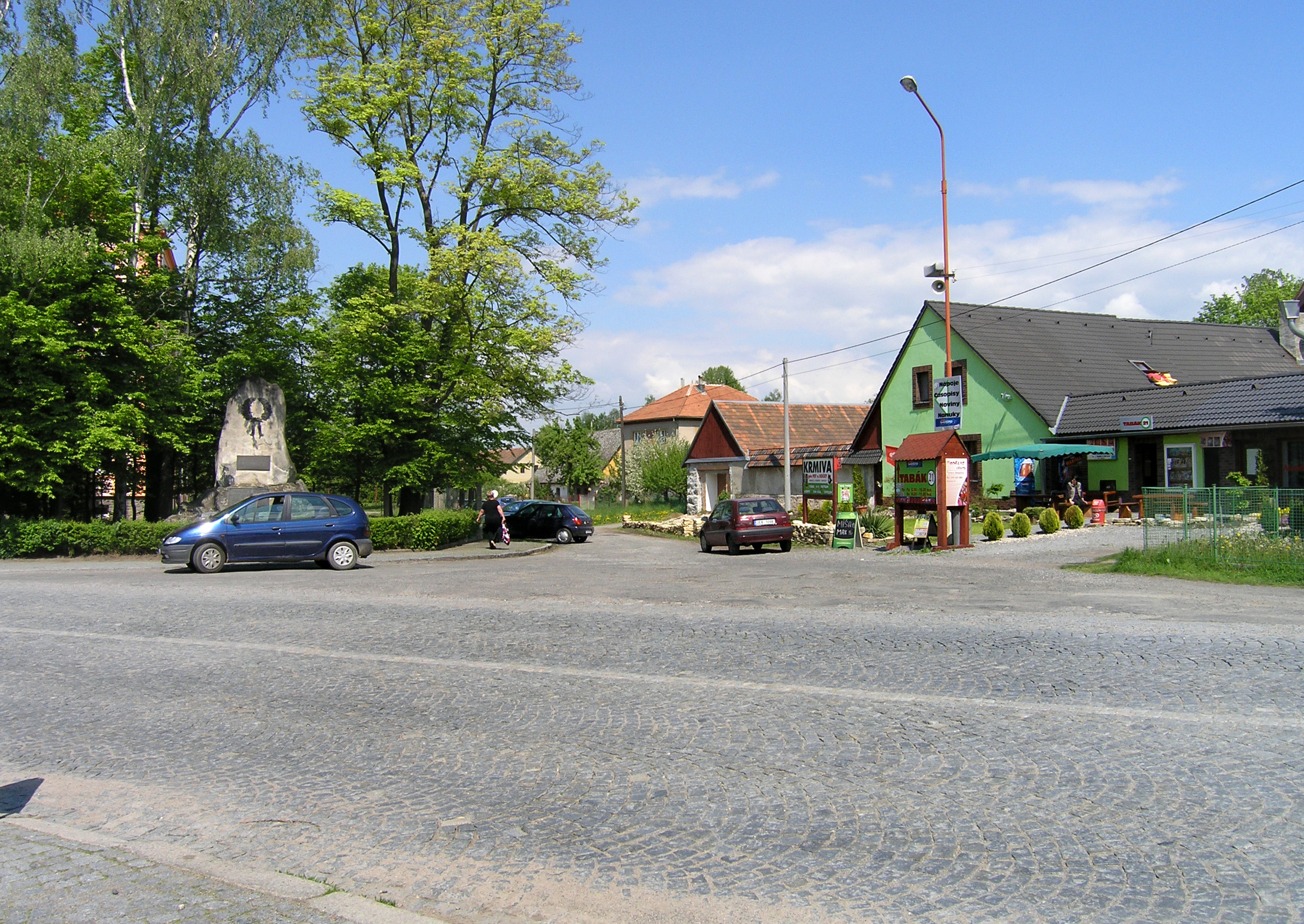
- Centre of Prosetín

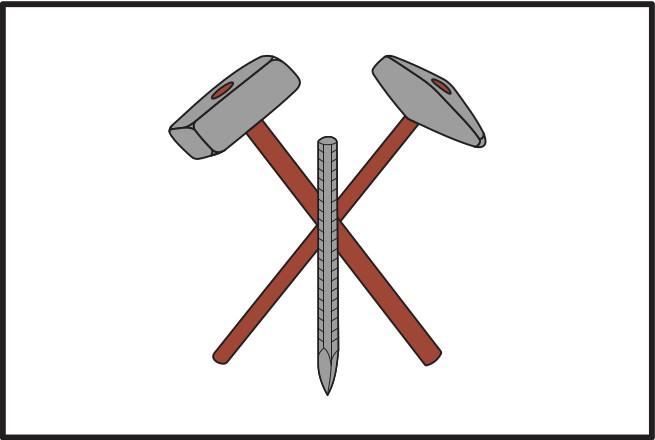
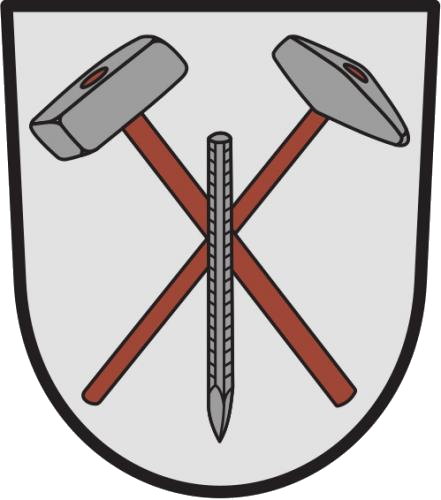
- Flag Coat of arms

- Location in the Czech Republic
- Coordinates: 49°49′59″N 15°57′28″E
- Country: Czech Republic
- Region: Pardubice
- District: Chrudim
- First mentioned: 1445

Area
  - Total: 5.32 km^{2} (2.05 sq mi)
- Elevation: 421 m (1,381 ft)

Population (2026-01-01)
  - Total: 794
  - Density: 149/km^{2} (387/sq mi)
- Time zone: UTC+1 (CET)
  - Summer (DST): UTC+2 (CEST)
- Postal codes: 539 73, 539 76
- Website: www.prosetin.eu

Prosetín is a municipality and village in Chrudim District in the Pardubice Region of the Czech Republic. It has about 800 inhabitants.

== Administrative division ==
Prosetín consists of three municipal parts (in brackets population according to the 2021 census):

- Prosetín (655)
- Malinné (91)
- Mokrýšov (38)

== Demographics ==
Historical population
Year	Pop.	±%
1869	663	—
1880	681	+2.7%
1890	689	+1.2%
1900	805	+16.8%
1910	825	+2.5%
1921	818	−0.8%
1930	1,086	+32.8%
1950	847	−22.0%
1961	965	+13.9%
1970	831	−13.9%
1980	865	+4.1%
1991	824	−4.7%
2001	800	−2.9%
2011	774	−3.2%
2021	784	+1.3%
Source: Censuses
