= Lipovec (Chrudim District) =

- Municipality
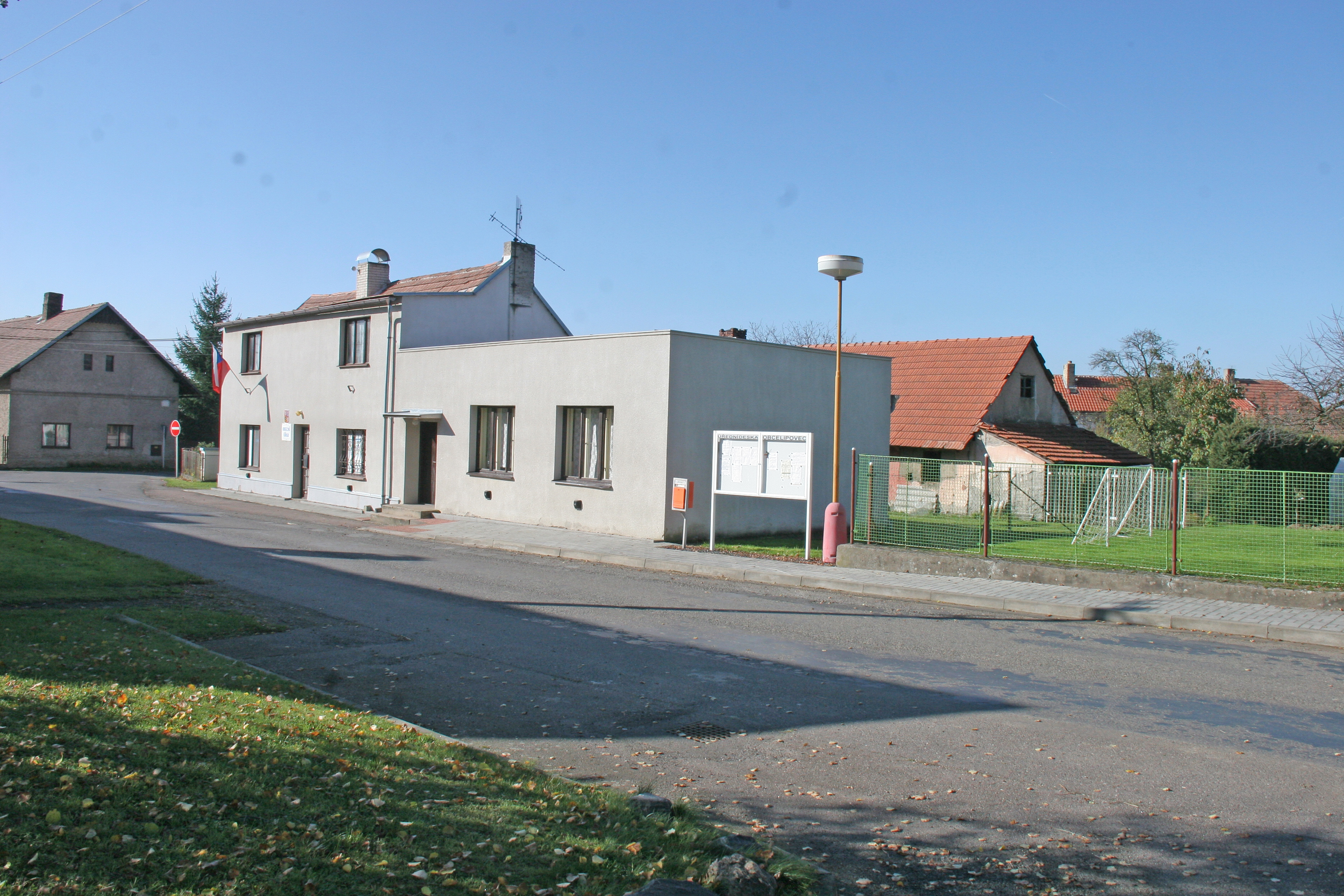
- Municipal office

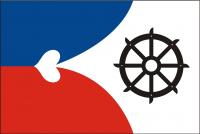
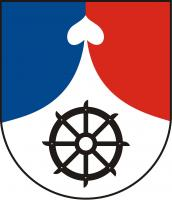
- Flag Coat of arms

- Location in the Czech Republic
- Coordinates: 49°54′59″N 15°32′42″E
- Country: Czech Republic
- Region: Pardubice
- District: Chrudim
- First mentioned: 1401

Area
  - Total: 5.38 km^{2} (2.08 sq mi)
- Elevation: 340 m (1,120 ft)

Population (2026-01-01)
  - Total: 239
  - Density: 44.4/km^{2} (115/sq mi)
- Time zone: UTC+1 (CET)
  - Summer (DST): UTC+2 (CEST)
- Postal code: 538 43
- Website: www.lipovec-licomerice.cz

Lipovec is a municipality and village in Chrudim District in the Pardubice Region of the Czech Republic. It has about 200 inhabitants.

== Administrative division ==
Lipovec consists of two municipal parts (in brackets population according to the 2021 census):

- Lipovec (124)
- Licoměřice (121)

== Demographics ==
Historical population
Year	Pop.	±%
1869	573	—
1880	613	+7.0%
1890	575	−6.2%
1900	551	−4.2%
1910	573	+4.0%
1921	551	−3.8%
1930	512	−7.1%
1950	388	−24.2%
1961	367	−5.4%
1970	348	−5.2%
1980	309	−11.2%
1991	229	−25.9%
2001	231	+0.9%
2011	233	+0.9%
2021	245	+5.2%
Source: Censuses
