= Pokřikov =

- Municipality
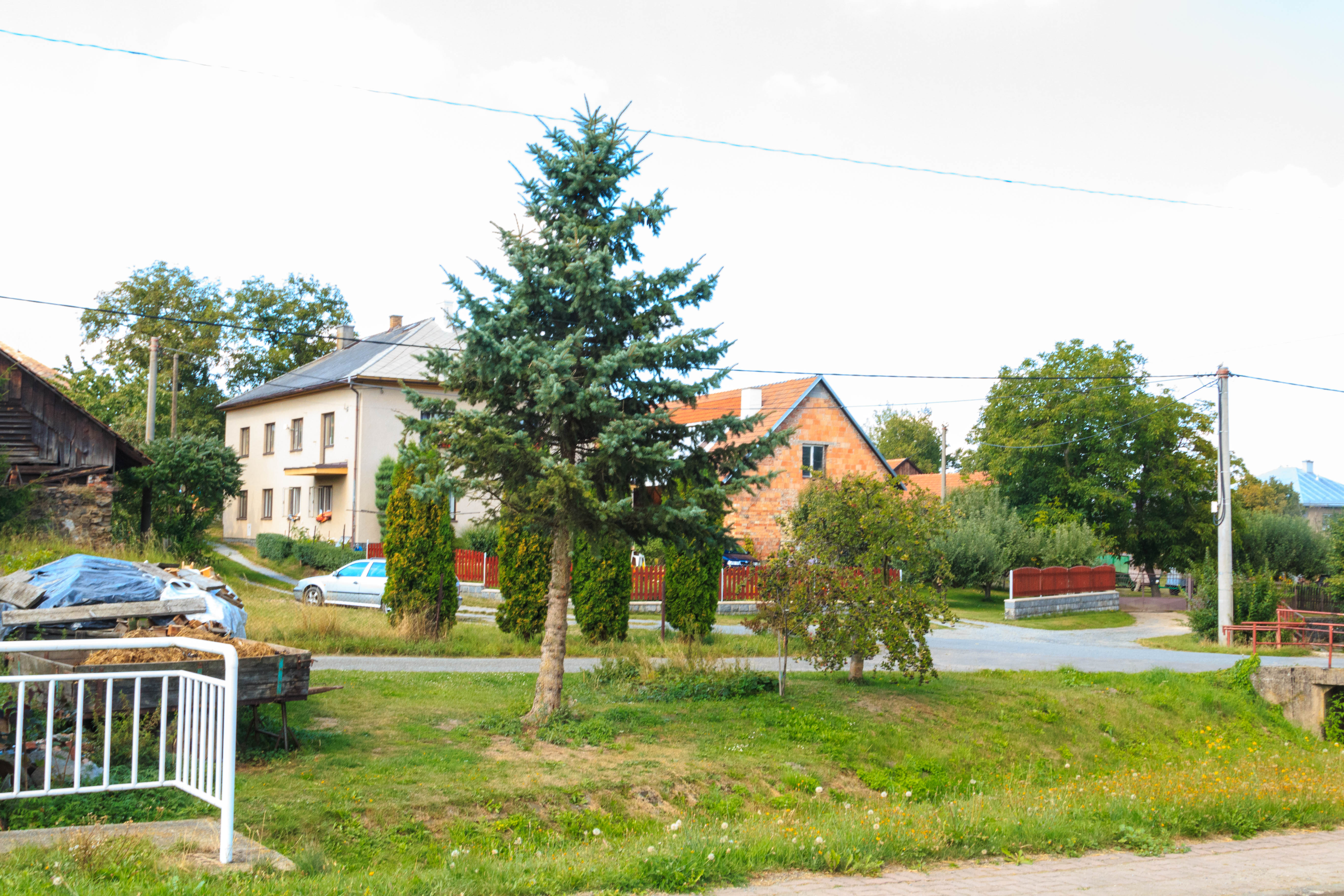
- Northern part of Pokřikov

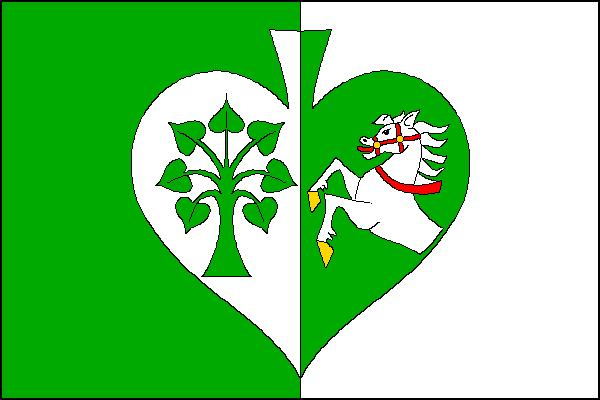
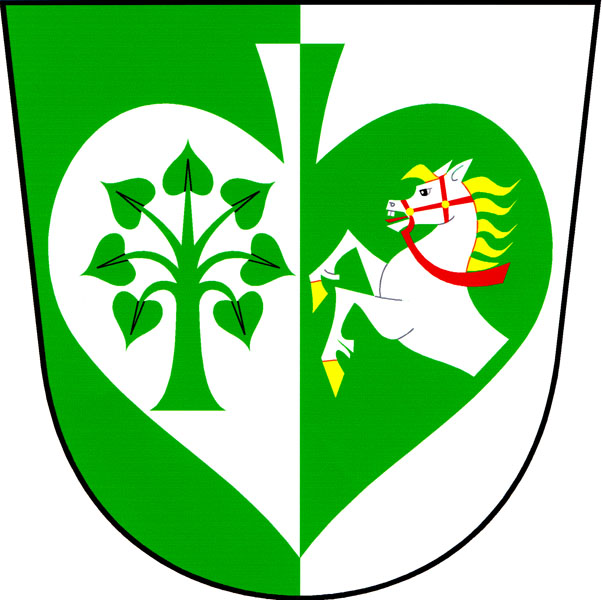
- Flag Coat of arms

- Location in the Czech Republic
- Coordinates: 49°47′49″N 15°59′18″E
- Country: Czech Republic
- Region: Pardubice
- District: Chrudim
- First mentioned: 1392

Area
  - Total: 4.86 km^{2} (1.88 sq mi)
- Elevation: 497 m (1,631 ft)

Population (2026-01-01)
  - Total: 252
  - Density: 51.9/km^{2} (134/sq mi)
- Time zone: UTC+1 (CET)
  - Summer (DST): UTC+2 (CEST)
- Postal code: 539 01
- Website: www.pokrikov.cz

Pokřikov is a municipality and village in Chrudim District in the Pardubice Region of the Czech Republic. It has about 300 inhabitants.

== History ==
The first written mention of Pokřikov is from 1392.

== Demographics ==
Historical population
Year	Pop.	±%
1869	392	—
1880	455	+16.1%
1890	477	+4.8%
1900	483	+1.3%
1910	474	−1.9%
1921	478	+0.8%
1930	466	−2.5%
1950	395	−15.2%
1961	375	−5.1%
1970	352	−6.1%
1980	317	−9.9%
1991	286	−9.8%
2001	272	−4.9%
2011	264	−2.9%
2021	251	−4.9%
Source: Censuses
