= Perálec =

- Municipality
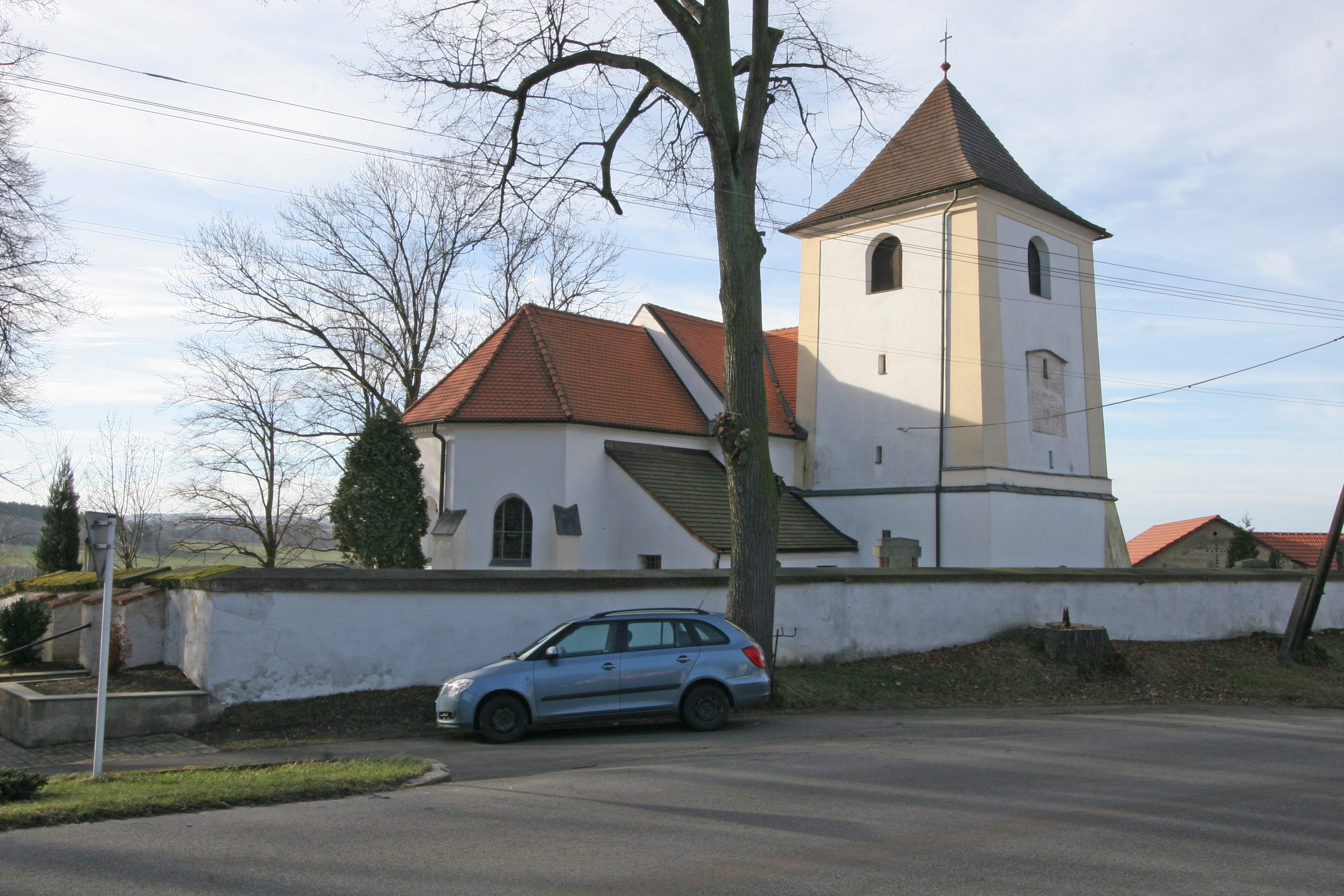
- Church of Saint John the Baptist

- Flag Coat of arms

- Location in the Czech Republic
- Coordinates: 49°49′37″N 16°4′48″E
- Country: Czech Republic
- Region: Pardubice
- District: Chrudim
- First mentioned: 1349

Area
  - Total: 4.57 km^{2} (1.76 sq mi)
- Elevation: 477 m (1,565 ft)

Population (2026-01-01)
  - Total: 259
  - Density: 56.7/km^{2} (147/sq mi)
- Time zone: UTC+1 (CET)
  - Summer (DST): UTC+2 (CEST)
- Postal code: 539 44
- Website: www.peralec.cz

Perálec is a municipality and village in Chrudim District in the Pardubice Region of the Czech Republic. It has about 300 inhabitants.

== Administrative division ==
Perálec consists of two municipal parts (in brackets population according to the 2021 census):

- Perálec (196)
- Kutřín (44)

== Demographics ==
Historical population
Year	Pop.	±%
1869	496	—
1880	543	+9.5%
1890	513	−5.5%
1900	512	−0.2%
1910	522	+2.0%
1921	481	−7.9%
1930	460	−4.4%
1950	365	−20.7%
1961	342	−6.3%
1970	317	−7.3%
1980	267	−15.8%
1991	247	−7.5%
2001	251	+1.6%
2011	234	−6.8%
2021	240	+2.6%
Source: Censuses
