= Vojtěchov (Chrudim District) =

- Municipality
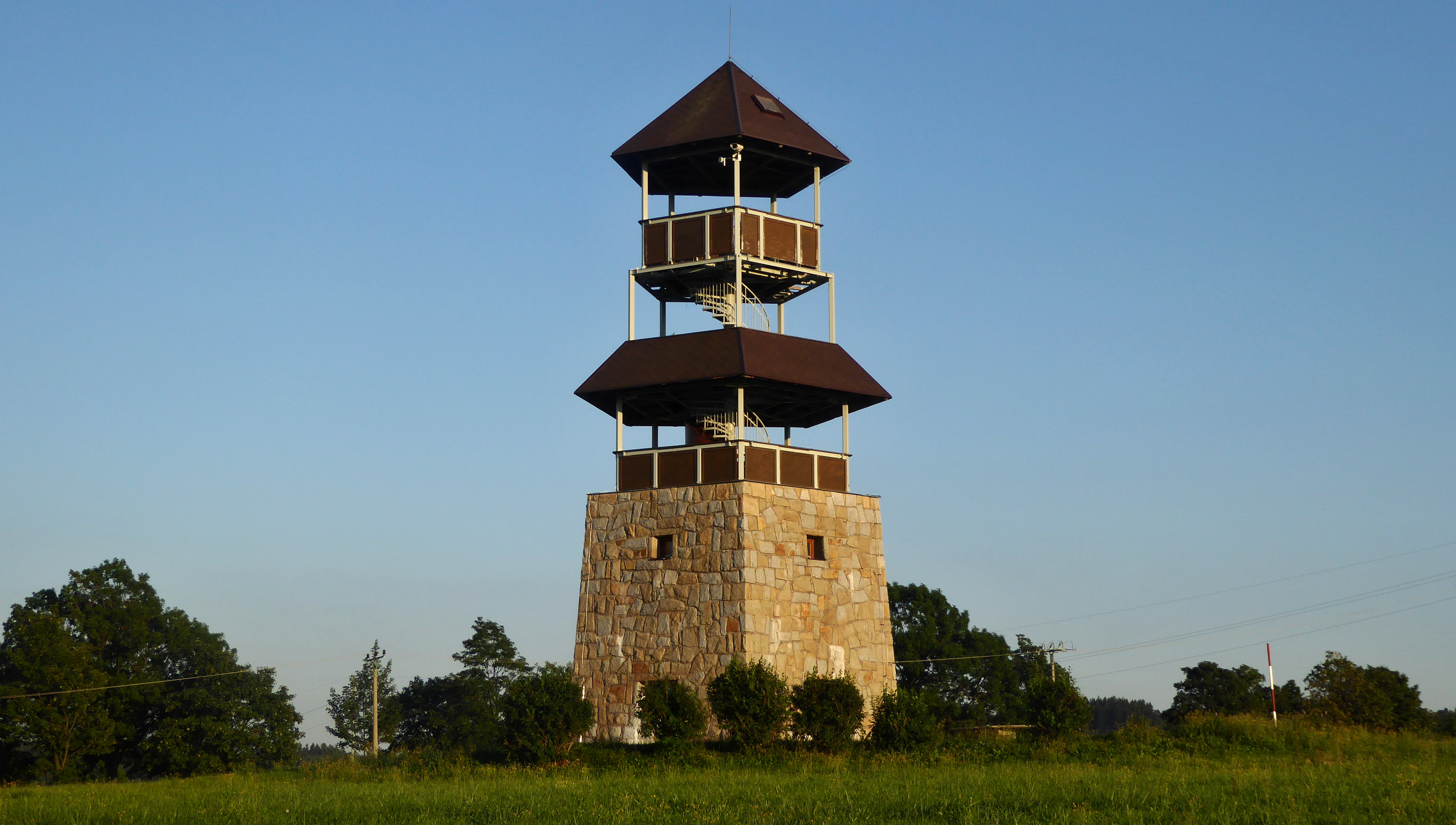
- Vojtěchov observation tower

- Flag Coat of arms

- Location in the Czech Republic
- Coordinates: 49°47′19″N 15°58′25″E
- Country: Czech Republic
- Region: Pardubice
- District: Chrudim
- First mentioned: 1392

Area
  - Total: 7.13 km^{2} (2.75 sq mi)
- Elevation: 528 m (1,732 ft)

Population (2026-01-01)
  - Total: 395
  - Density: 55.4/km^{2} (143/sq mi)
- Time zone: UTC+1 (CET)
  - Summer (DST): UTC+2 (CEST)
- Postal code: 539 01
- Website: www.obecvojtechov.cz

Vojtěchov is a municipality and village in Chrudim District in the Pardubice Region of the Czech Republic. It has about 400 inhabitants.

== Administrative division ==
Vojtěchov consists of two municipal parts (in brackets population according to the 2021 census):

- Vojtěchov (364)
- Pláňavy (26)

== Demographics ==
Historical population
Year	Pop.	±%
1869	577	—
1880	553	−4.2%
1890	535	−3.3%
1900	559	+4.5%
1910	567	+1.4%
1921	589	+3.9%
1930	622	+5.6%
1950	476	−23.5%
1961	494	+3.8%
1970	466	−5.7%
1980	439	−5.8%
1991	434	−1.1%
2001	422	−2.8%
2011	427	+1.2%
2021	390	−8.7%
Source: Censuses
