= Chrudim District =

Chrudim District Okres Chrudim
- District
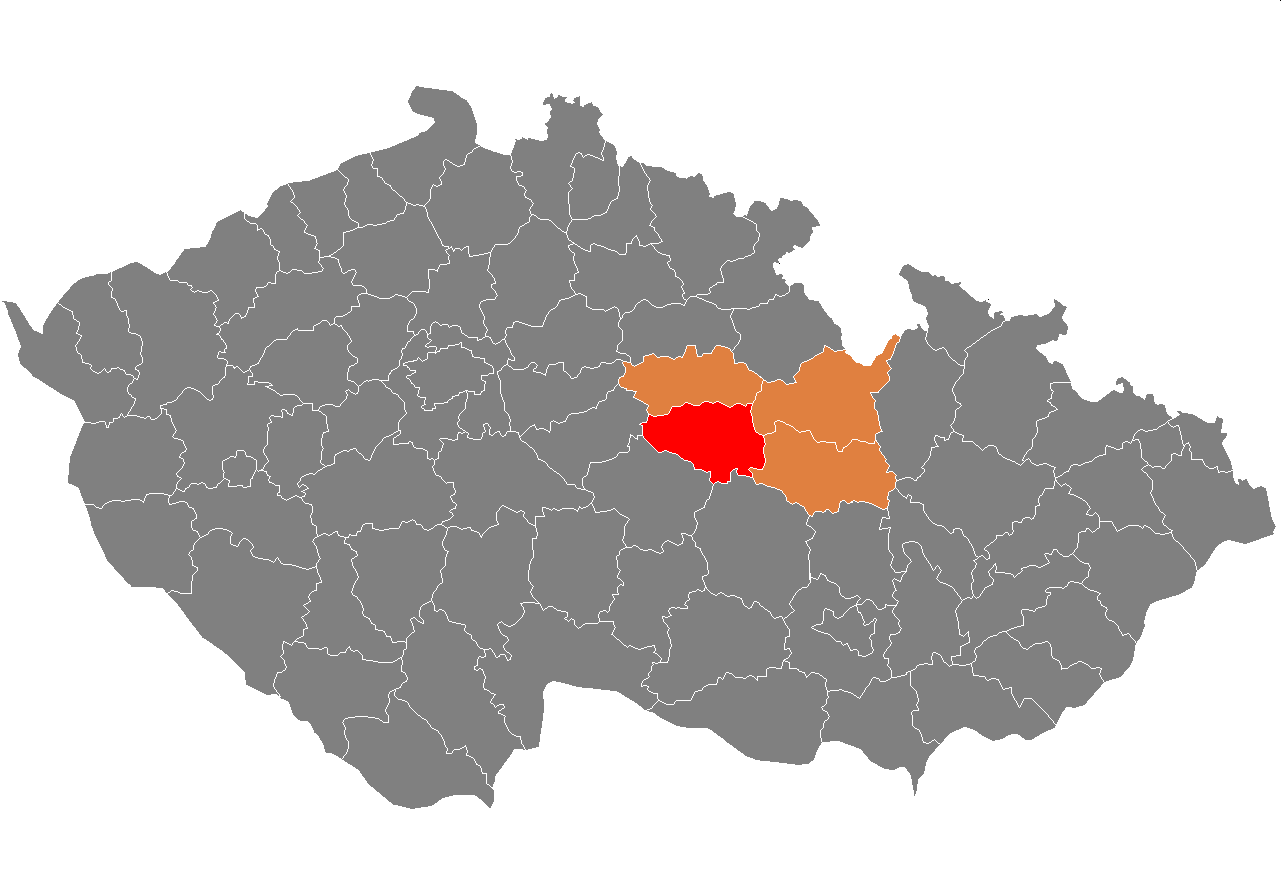
- Location in the Pardubice Region within the Czech Republic
- Coordinates: 49°52′N 15°54′E
- Country: Czech Republic
- Region: Pardubice
- Capital: Chrudim

Area
  - Total: 992.89 km^{2} (383.36 sq mi)

Population (2026)
  - Total: 106,533
  - Density: 107.30/km^{2} (277.90/sq mi)
- Time zone: UTC+1 (CET)
  - Summer (DST): UTC+2 (CEST)
- Municipalities: 108
- * Towns: 13
- * Market towns: 5

Chrudim District (Czech: okres Chrudim) is a district in the Pardubice Region of the Czech Republic. Its capital is the town of Chrudim.

== Administrative division ==
Chrudim District is divided into two administrative districts of municipalities with extended competence: Chrudim and Hlinsko.

=== List of municipalities ===
Towns are marked in bold and market towns in italics:

Chrudim - Běstvina - Biskupice - Bítovany - Bojanov - Bor u Skutče - Bořice - Bousov - Bylany - Ctětín - Čankovice - České Lhotice - Chrast - Chroustovice - Dědová - Dolní Bezděkov - Dřenice - Dvakačovice - Hamry - Heřmanův Městec - Hlinsko - Hluboká - Hodonín - Holetín - Honbice - Horka - Horní Bradlo - Hošťalovice - Hrochův Týnec - Hroubovice - Jeníkov - Jenišovice - Kameničky - Kladno - Klešice - Kněžice - Kočí - Kostelec u Heřmanova Městce - Krásné - Křižanovice - Krouna - Lány - Leštinka - Libkov - Liboměřice - Licibořice - Lipovec - Lozice - Lukavice - Luže - Míčov-Sušice - Miřetice - Mladoňovice - Morašice - Mrákotín - Nabočany - Načešice - Nasavrky - Orel - Ostrov - Otradov - Perálec - Podhořany u Ronova - Pokřikov - Prachovice - Předhradí - Přestavlky - Proseč - Prosetín - Raná - Rabštejnská Lhota - Řestoky - Ronov nad Doubravou - Rosice - Rozhovice - Seč - Skuteč - Slatiňany - Smrček - Sobětuchy - Stolany - Střemošice - Studnice - Svídnice - Svratouch - Tisovec - Třemošnice - Trhová Kamenice - Třibřichy - Trojovice - Tuněchody - Úherčice - Úhřetice - Vápenný Podol - Včelákov - Vejvanovice - Vítanov - Vojtěchov - Vortová - Vrbatův Kostelec - Všeradov - Vysočina - Vyžice - Zaječice - Zájezdec - Zderaz - Žlebské Chvalovice - Žumberk

== Geography ==
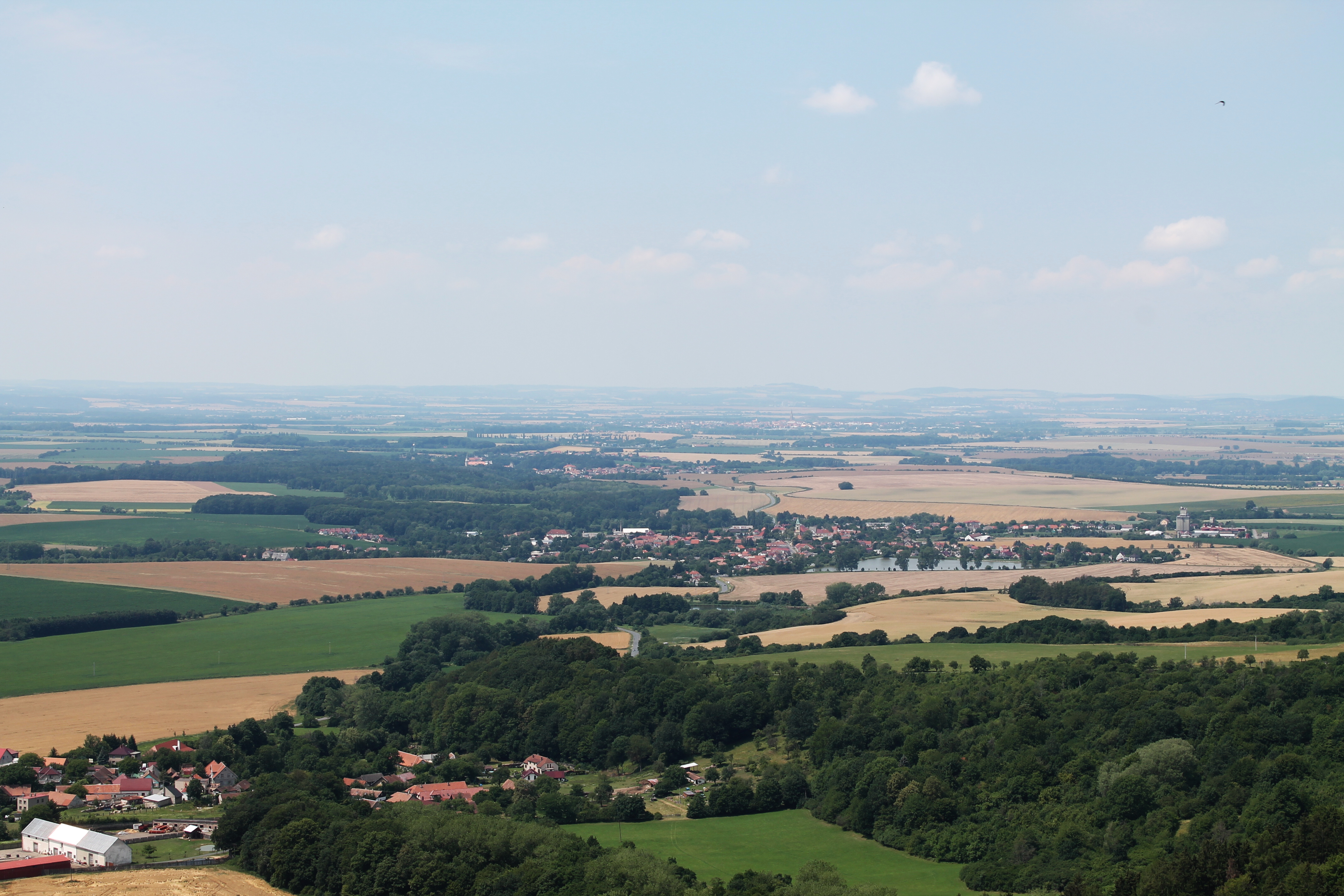
Třemošnice and surrounding landscape

The landscape consists of two distinct parts. Towards the south the district is hilly and mostly forested, in the north it is flatter and deforested. The territory extends into five geomorphological mesoregions: Iron Mountains (most of the territory), Svitavy Uplands (north), Central Elbe Table (a small part in the west), Upper Sázava Hills (a small part in the west) and East Elbe Table (a small part in the northeast). The highest point of the district is the hill Karlštejn in Svratouch with an elevation of 784 m (2,572 ft), the lowest point is the river bed of the Chrudimka in Úhřetice at 230 m (750 ft).

From the total district area of 992.9 km^{2} (383.4 sq mi), agricultural land occupies 602.1 km^{2} (232.5 sq mi), forests occupy 288.1 km^{2} (111.2 sq mi), and water area occupies 15.4 km^{2} (5.9 sq mi). Forests cover 29.0% of the district's area.

The most important river is the Chrudimka, which flows across the district from south to north. The Doubrava crosses the district in the west. The largest body of water is Seč Reservoir with an area of 220 ha (540 acres).

Two protected landscape areas extend into the district: Iron Mountains in the east and Žďárské vrchy in the south.

== Demographics ==
Historical population

Year	Pop.	±%
1869	112,143	—
1880	118,811	+5.9%
1890	118,948	+0.1%
1900	121,971	+2.5%
1910	126,851	+4.0%

Year	Pop.	±%
1921	123,317	−2.8%
1930	123,957	+0.5%
1950	102,109	−17.6%
1961	106,402	+4.2%
1970	104,210	−2.1%

Year	Pop.	±%
1980	105,548	+1.3%
1991	104,662	−0.8%
2001	103,934	−0.7%
2011	103,199	−0.7%
2021	102,743	−0.4%

Source: Censuses

=== Most populous municipalities ===
Name	Population	Area (km^{2})
Chrudim	23,562	33
Hlinsko	9,504	24
Skuteč	5,061	35
Heřmanův Městec	4,933	14
Slatiňany	4,134	16
Třemošnice	3,380	19
Chrast	3,181	18
Luže	2,589	31
Hrochův Týnec	2,187	13
Proseč	2,143	34

== Economy ==
The largest employers with headquarters in Chrudim District and at least 500 employees are:

Economic entity	Location	Number of employees	Main activity
Arriva Autobusy	Chrudim	1,000–1,499	Urban and suburban passenger transport
Hamzova odborná léčebna pro děti a dospělé	Luže	500–999	Health care
DAKO-CZ	Třemošnice	500–999	Manufacture of braking systems for rolling stock
Kovolis Hedvikov	Třemošnice	500–999	Casting of metals

== Transport ==
With the exception of a short section of the D35 motorway in the northernmost part of the district, there are no other motorways. The most important road is the I/37 road from Pardubice to Ždírec nad Doubravou.

== Sights ==
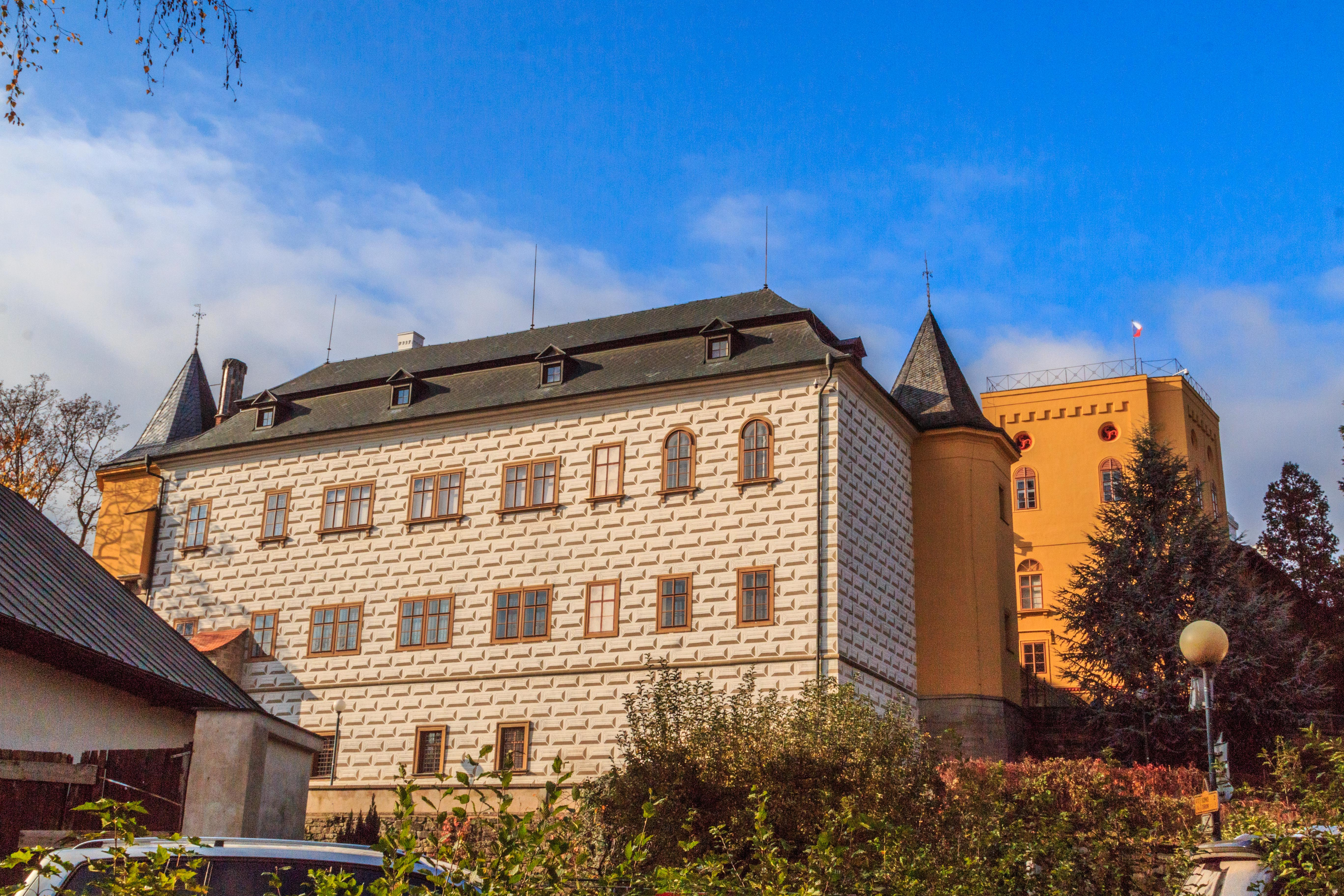
Slatiňany Castle

The most important monuments in the district, protected as national cultural monuments, are:

- Ležáky area
- Slatiňany Castle
- Church of Saint Bartholomew in Kočí
- Church of Our Lady Help of Christians on Chlumek

The best-preserved settlements and landscapes, protected as monument reservations and monument zones, are:

- Hlinsko-Betlém (monument reservation)
- České Lhotice archaeological site (monument reservation)
- Chrast
- Chrudim
- Heřmanův Městec
- Luže
- Předhradí
- Svobodné Hamry
- Slatiňansko-Slavicko landscape

The most visited tourist destinations are the Vysočina Open Air Museum in Hlinsko, and Museum of Puppetry Culture in Chrudim.
