= Stolany =

- Municipality
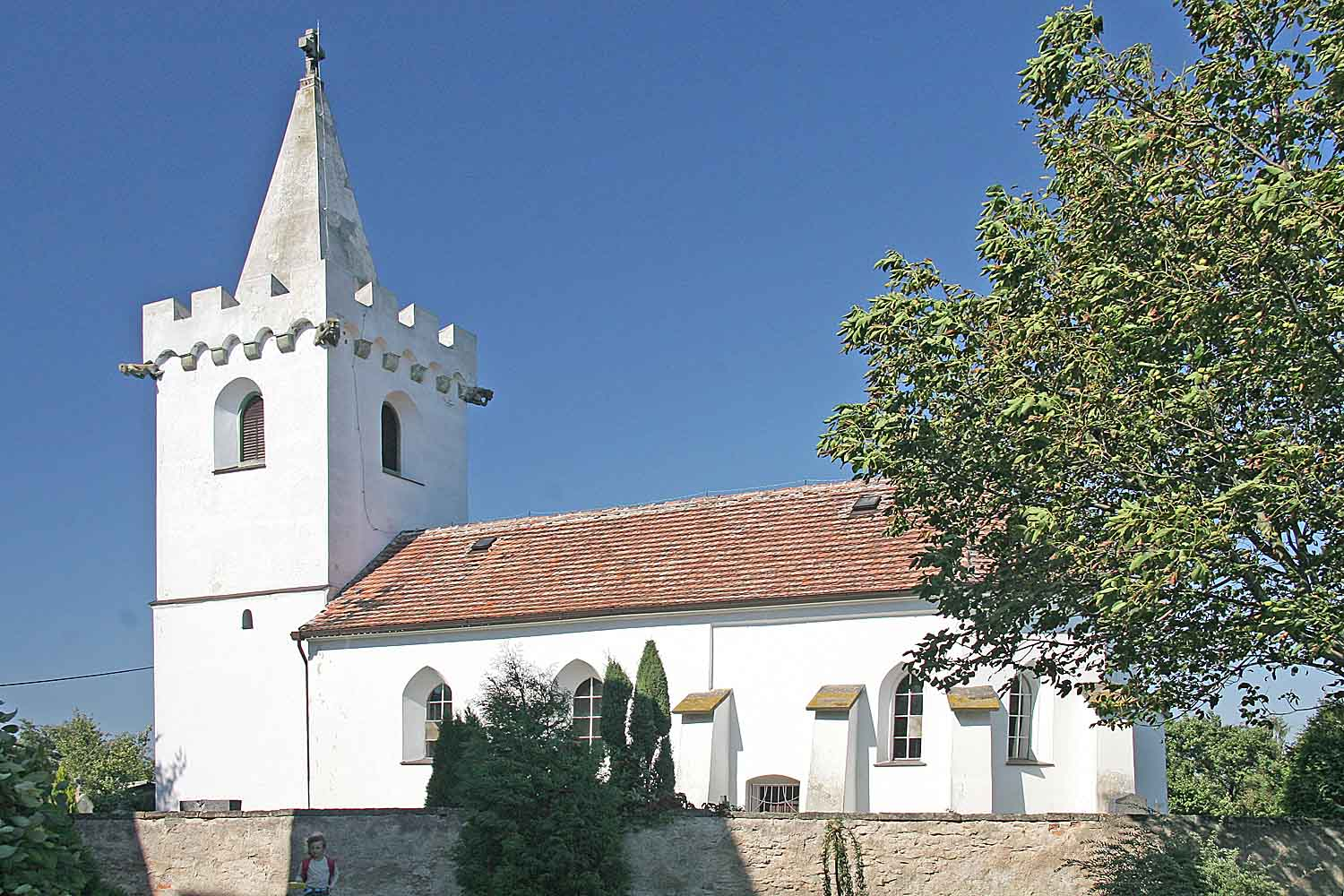
- Church of Saint Nicholas

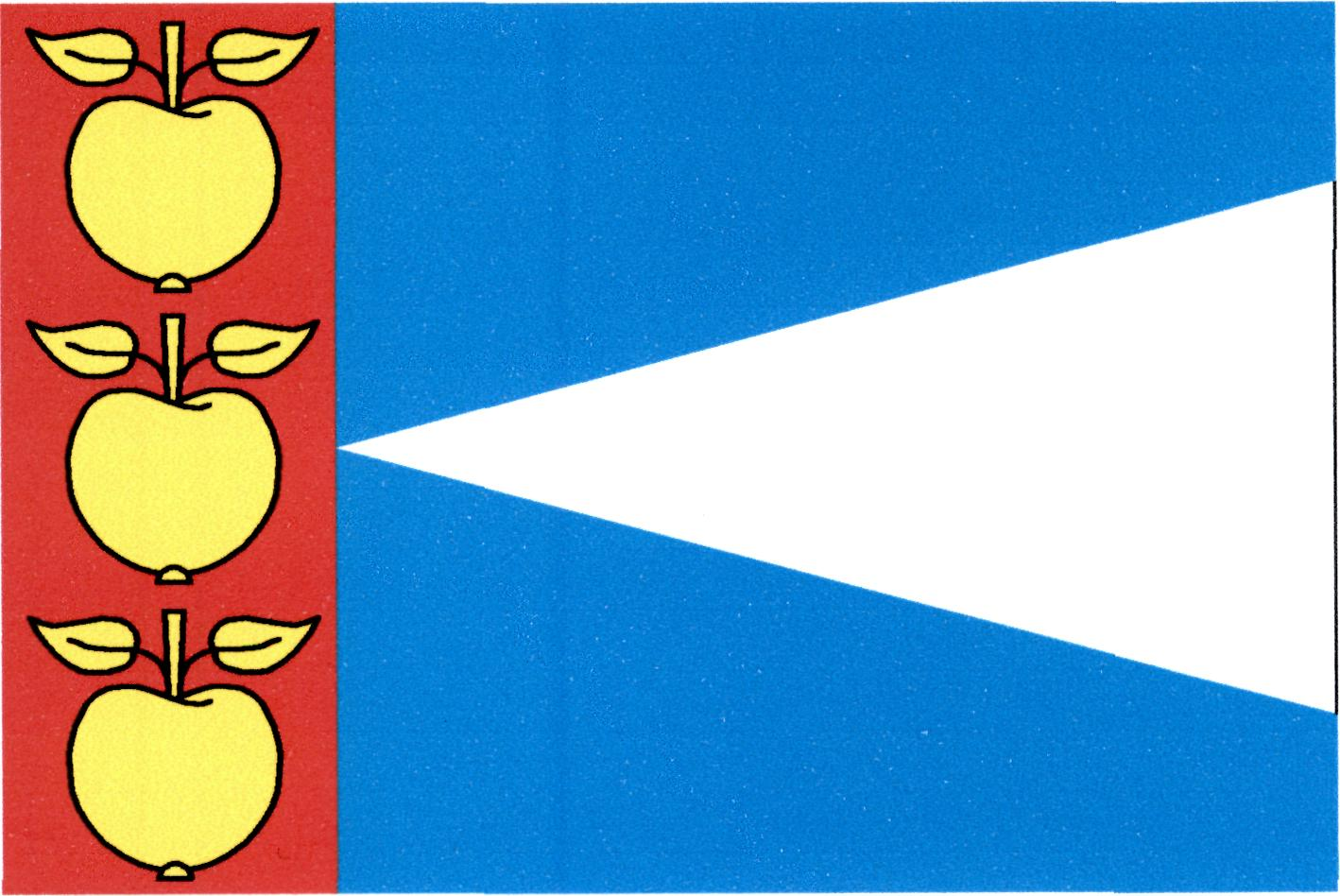
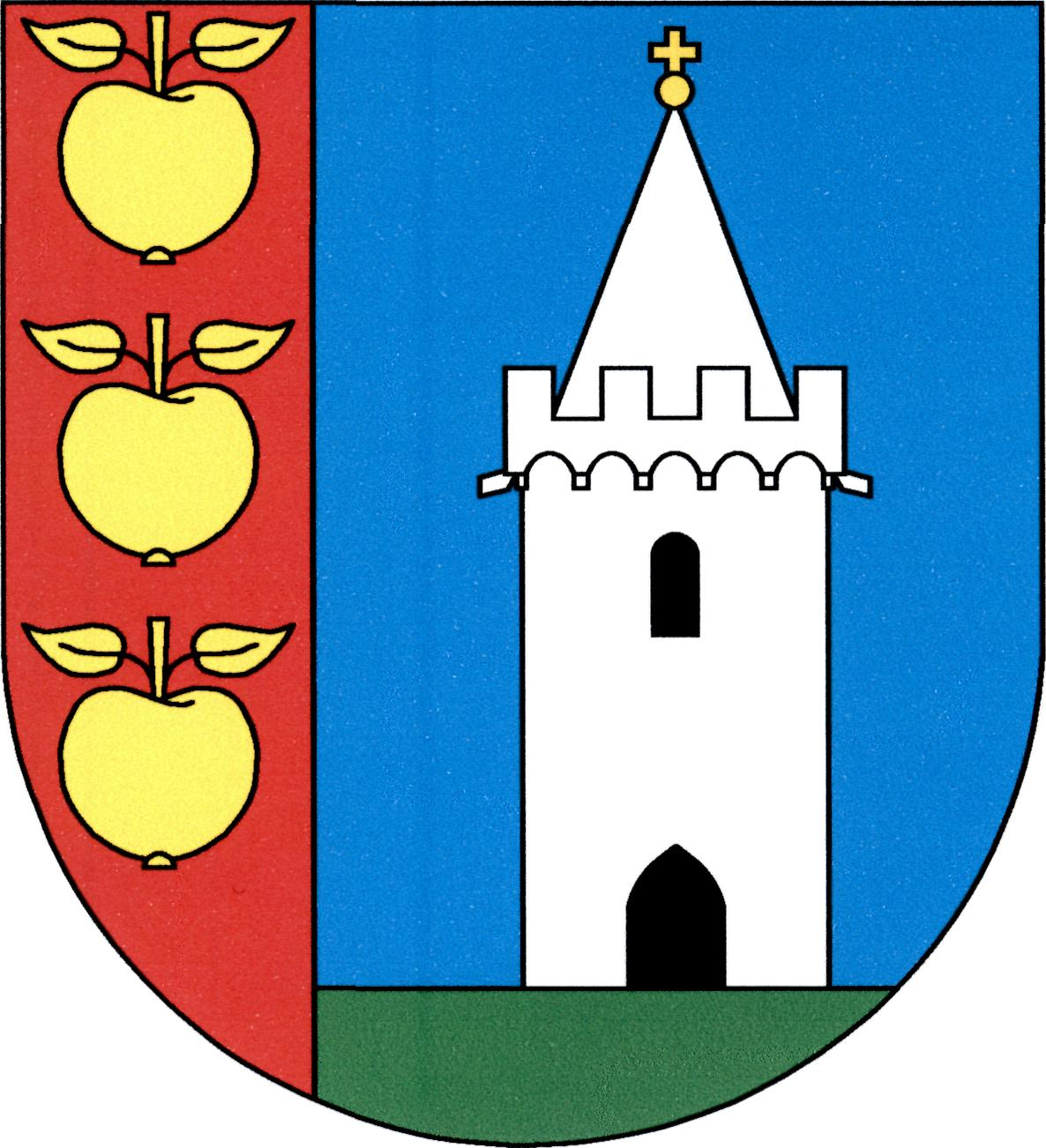
- Flag Coat of arms

- Location in the Czech Republic
- Coordinates: 49°55′40″N 15°44′43″E
- Country: Czech Republic
- Region: Pardubice
- District: Chrudim
- First mentioned: 1229

Area
  - Total: 5.47 km^{2} (2.11 sq mi)
- Elevation: 288 m (945 ft)

Population (2026-01-01)
  - Total: 408
  - Density: 74.6/km^{2} (193/sq mi)
- Time zone: UTC+1 (CET)
  - Summer (DST): UTC+2 (CEST)
- Postal code: 538 03
- Website: www.stolany.cz

Stolany is a municipality and village in Chrudim District in the Pardubice Region of the Czech Republic. It has about 400 inhabitants.

== Demographics ==
Historical population
Year	Pop.	±%
1869	410	—
1880	439	+7.1%
1890	445	+1.4%
1900	409	−8.1%
1910	424	+3.7%
1921	465	+9.7%
1930	398	−14.4%
1950	361	−9.3%
1961	355	−1.7%
1970	311	−12.4%
1980	293	−5.8%
1991	348	+18.8%
2001	372	+6.9%
2011	365	−1.9%
2021	364	−0.3%
Source: Censuses
