= Vyžice =

- Municipality
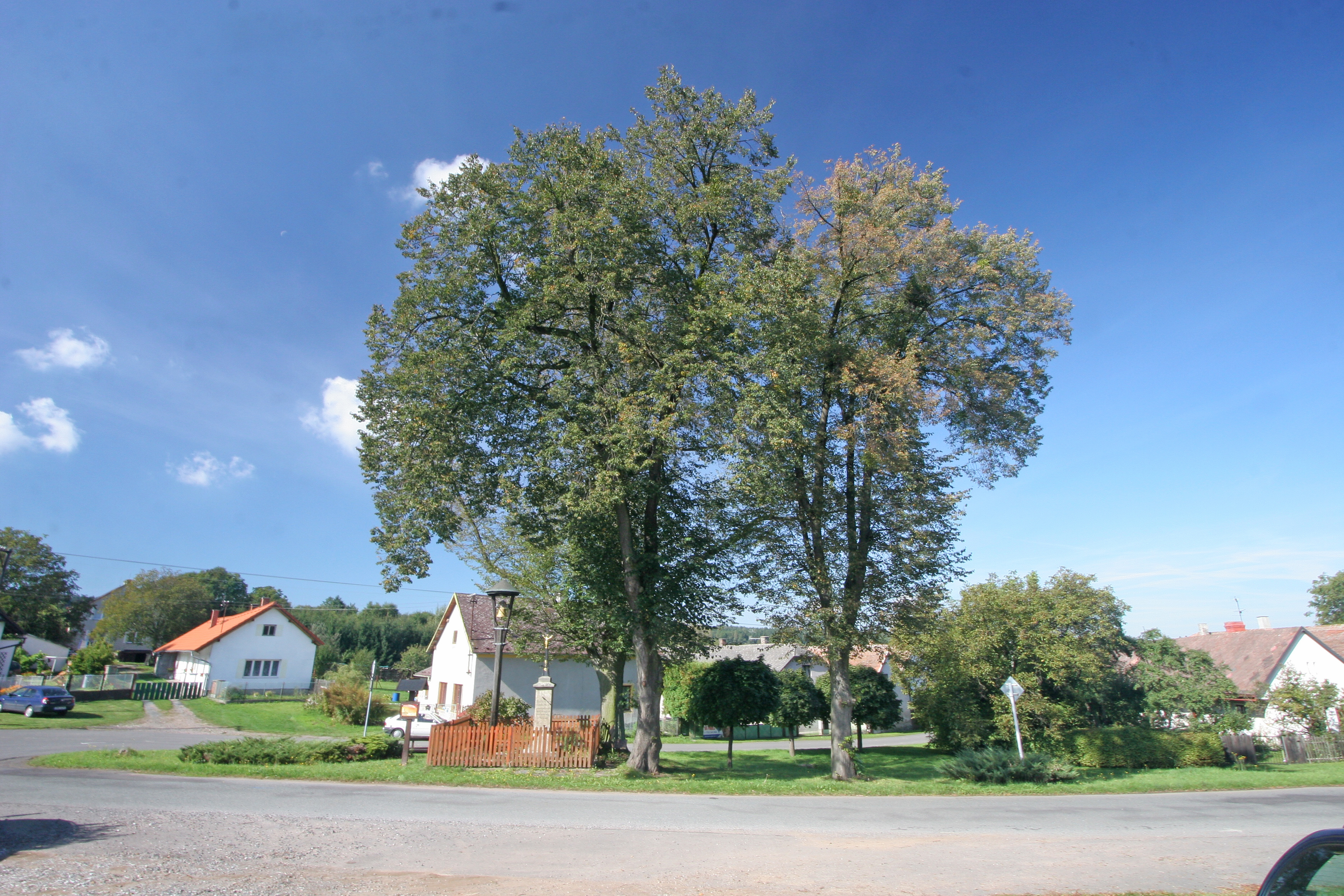
- Centre of Vyžice

- Location in the Czech Republic
- Coordinates: 49°55′24″N 15°37′16″E
- Country: Czech Republic
- Region: Pardubice
- District: Chrudim
- First mentioned: 1229

Area
  - Total: 3.42 km^{2} (1.32 sq mi)
- Elevation: 380 m (1,250 ft)

Population (2026-01-01)
  - Total: 249
  - Density: 72.8/km^{2} (189/sq mi)
- Time zone: UTC+1 (CET)
  - Summer (DST): UTC+2 (CEST)
- Postal code: 538 03
- Website: www.obec-vyzice.cz

Vyžice is a municipality and village in Chrudim District in the Pardubice Region of the Czech Republic. It has about 200 inhabitants.

== Administrative division ==
Vyžice consists of two municipal parts (in brackets population according to the 2021 census):

- Vyžice (151)
- Slavkovice (65)

== Demographics ==
Historical population
Year	Pop.	±%
1869	317	—
1880	319	+0.6%
1890	353	+10.7%
1900	351	−0.6%
1910	415	+18.2%
1921	403	−2.9%
1930	353	−12.4%
1950	245	−30.6%
1961	265	+8.2%
1970	259	−2.3%
1980	206	−20.5%
1991	162	−21.4%
2001	159	−1.9%
2011	174	+9.4%
2021	216	+24.1%
Source: Censuses
