= Všeradov =

- Municipality
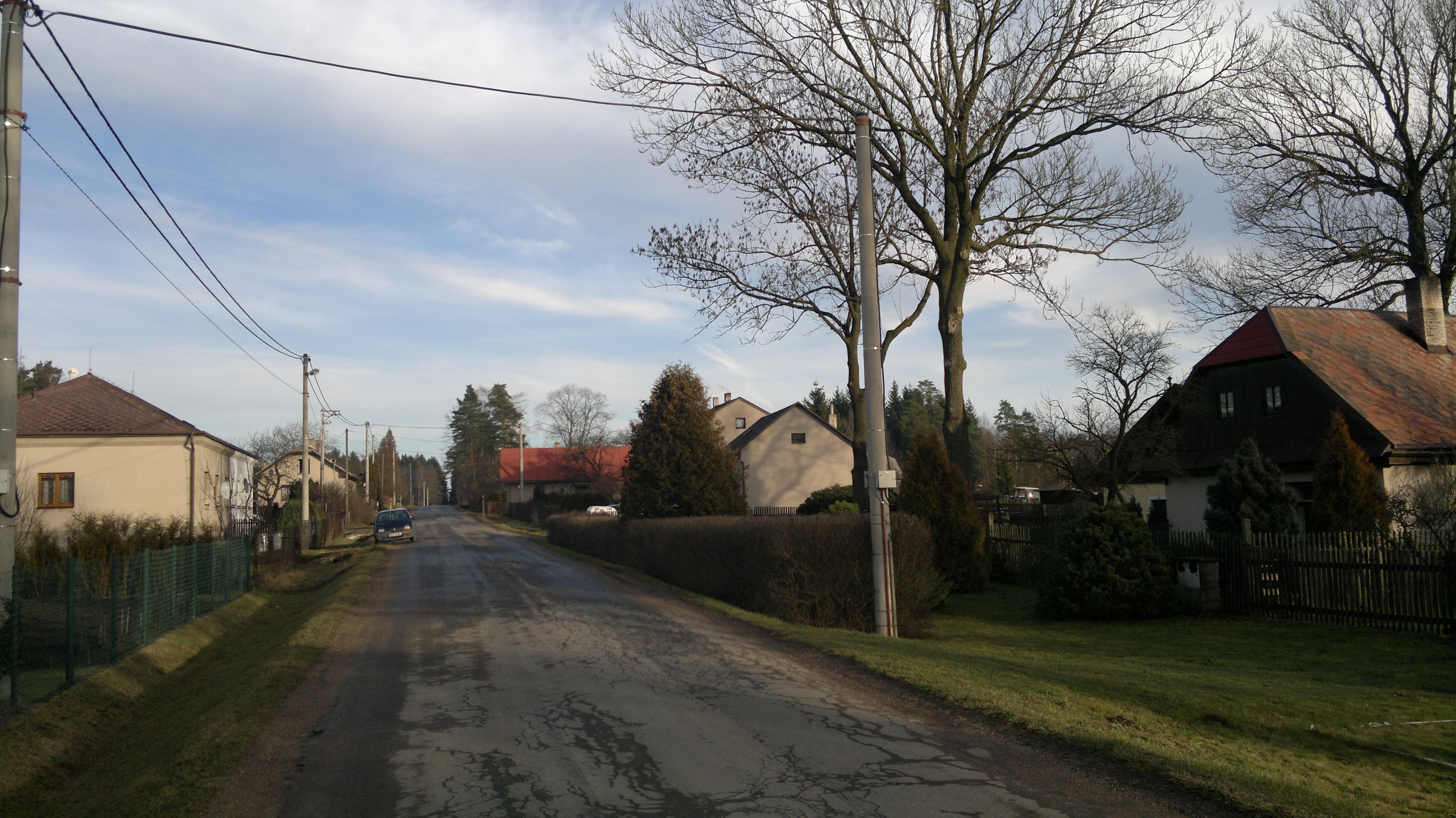
- Main road

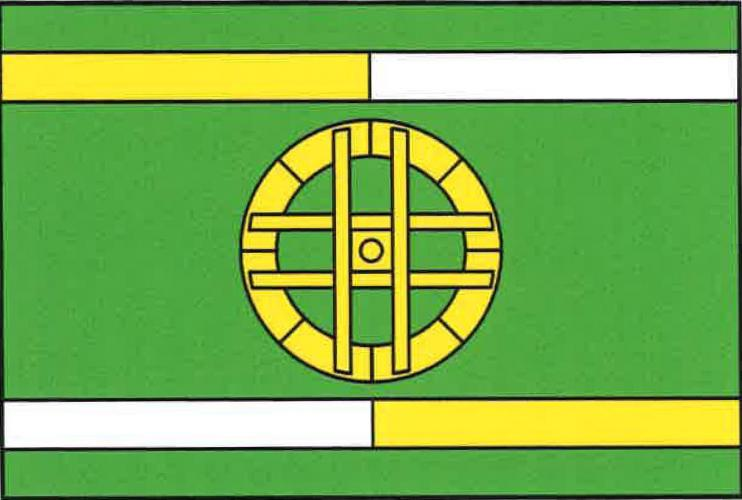
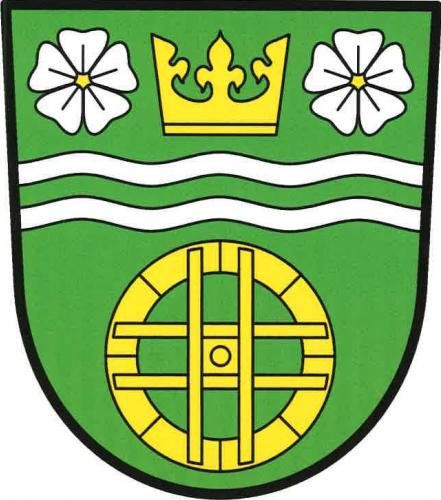
- Flag Coat of arms

- Location in the Czech Republic
- Coordinates: 49°44′52″N 15°50′14″E
- Country: Czech Republic
- Region: Pardubice
- District: Chrudim
- First mentioned: 1487

Area
  - Total: 5.09 km^{2} (1.97 sq mi)
- Elevation: 572 m (1,877 ft)

Population (2026-01-01)
  - Total: 132
  - Density: 25.9/km^{2} (67.2/sq mi)
- Time zone: UTC+1 (CET)
  - Summer (DST): UTC+2 (CEST)
- Postal code: 539 01
- Website: vseradov.cz

Všeradov is a municipality and village in Chrudim District in the Pardubice Region of the Czech Republic. It has about 100 inhabitants.

== Administrative division ==
Všeradov consists of three municipal parts (in brackets population according to the 2021 census):

- Všeradov (95)
- Jasné Pole (24)
- Milesimov (30)

== Demographics ==
Historical population
Year	Pop.	±%
1869	334	—
1880	328	−1.8%
1890	344	+4.9%
1900	370	+7.6%
1910	400	+8.1%
1921	386	−3.5%
1930	395	+2.3%
1950	272	−31.1%
1961	283	+4.0%
1970	240	−15.2%
1980	215	−10.4%
1991	162	−24.7%
2001	148	−8.6%
2011	156	+5.4%
2021	149	−4.5%
Source: Censuses
