= Horka (Chrudim District) =

- Municipality
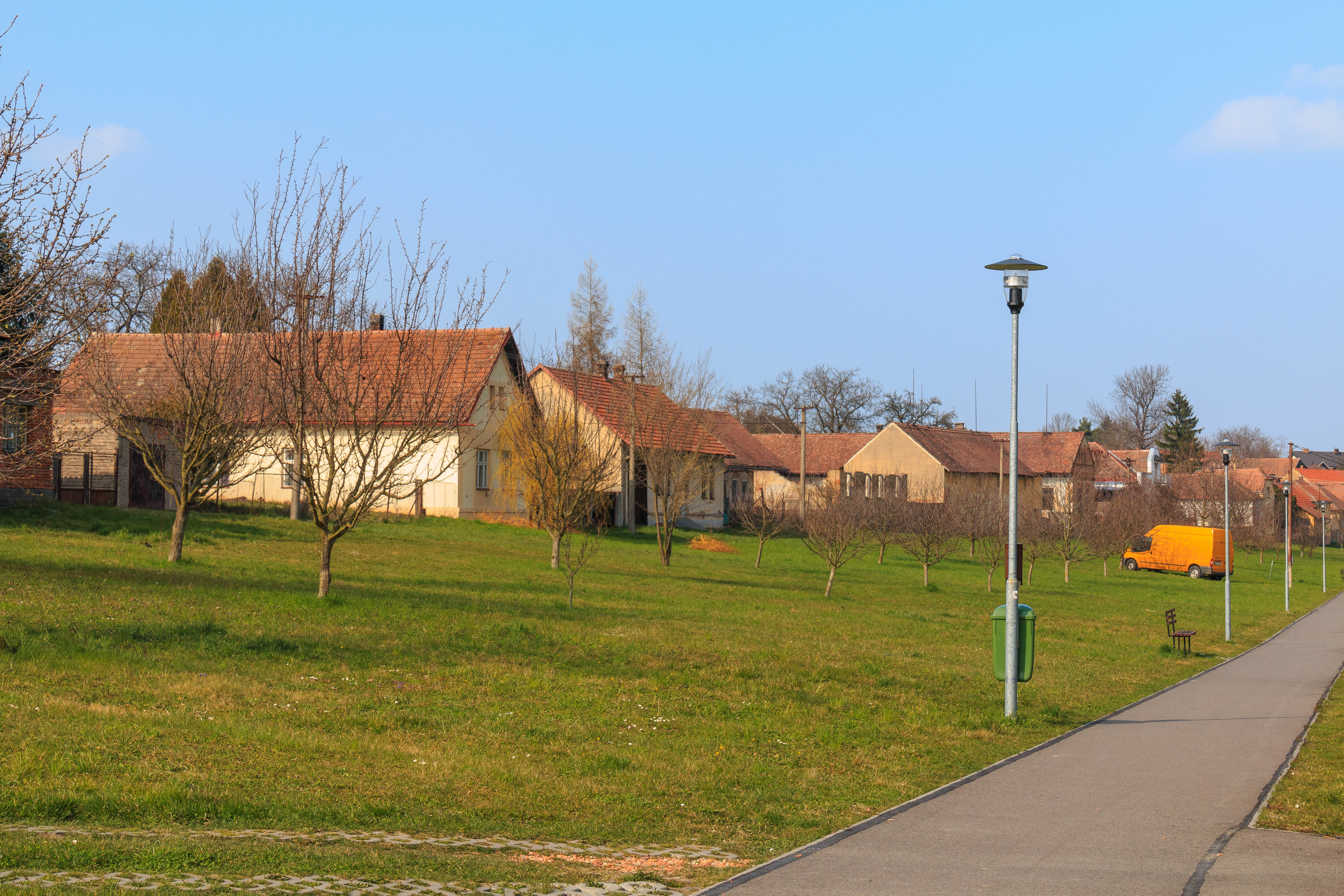
- Centre of Horka

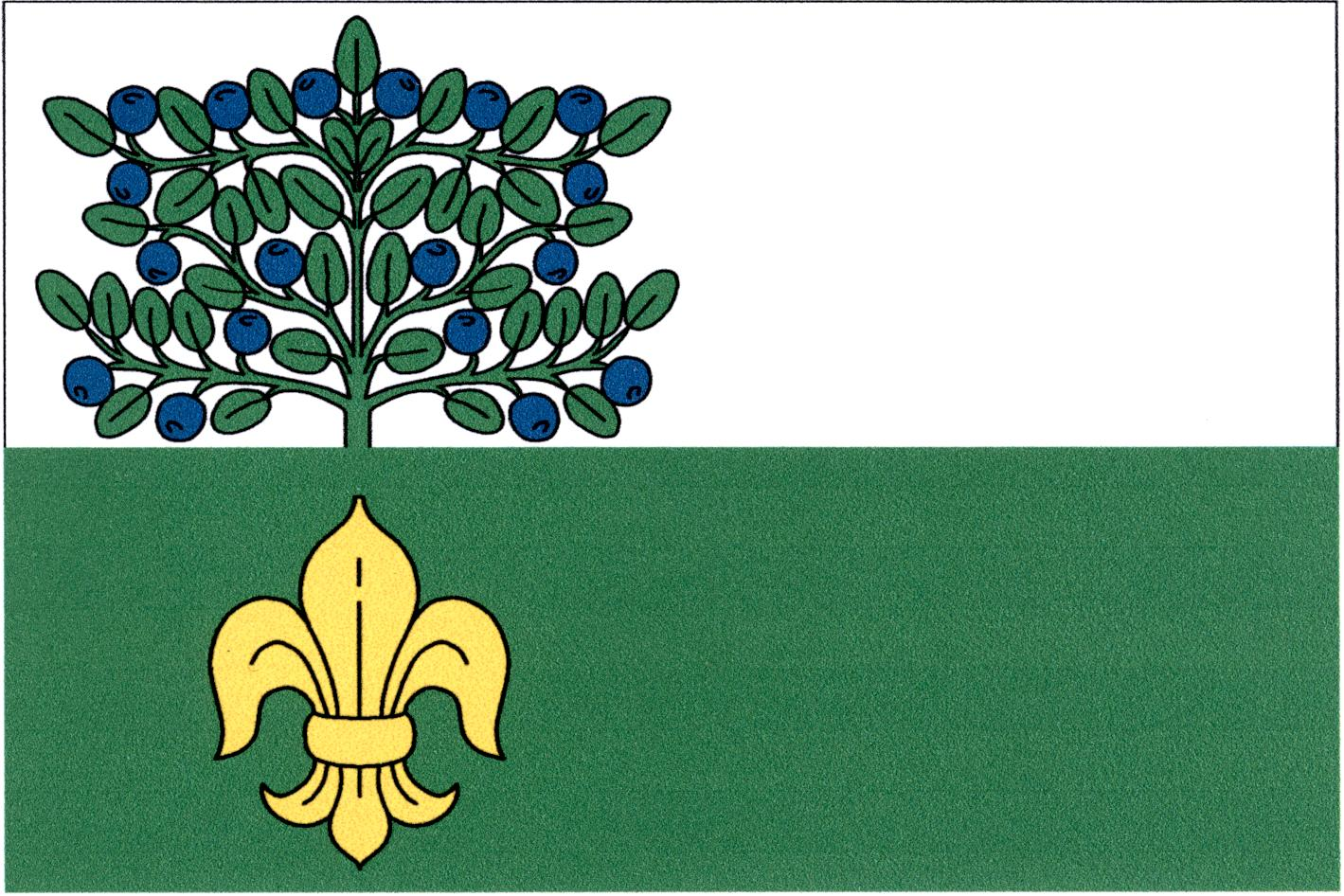
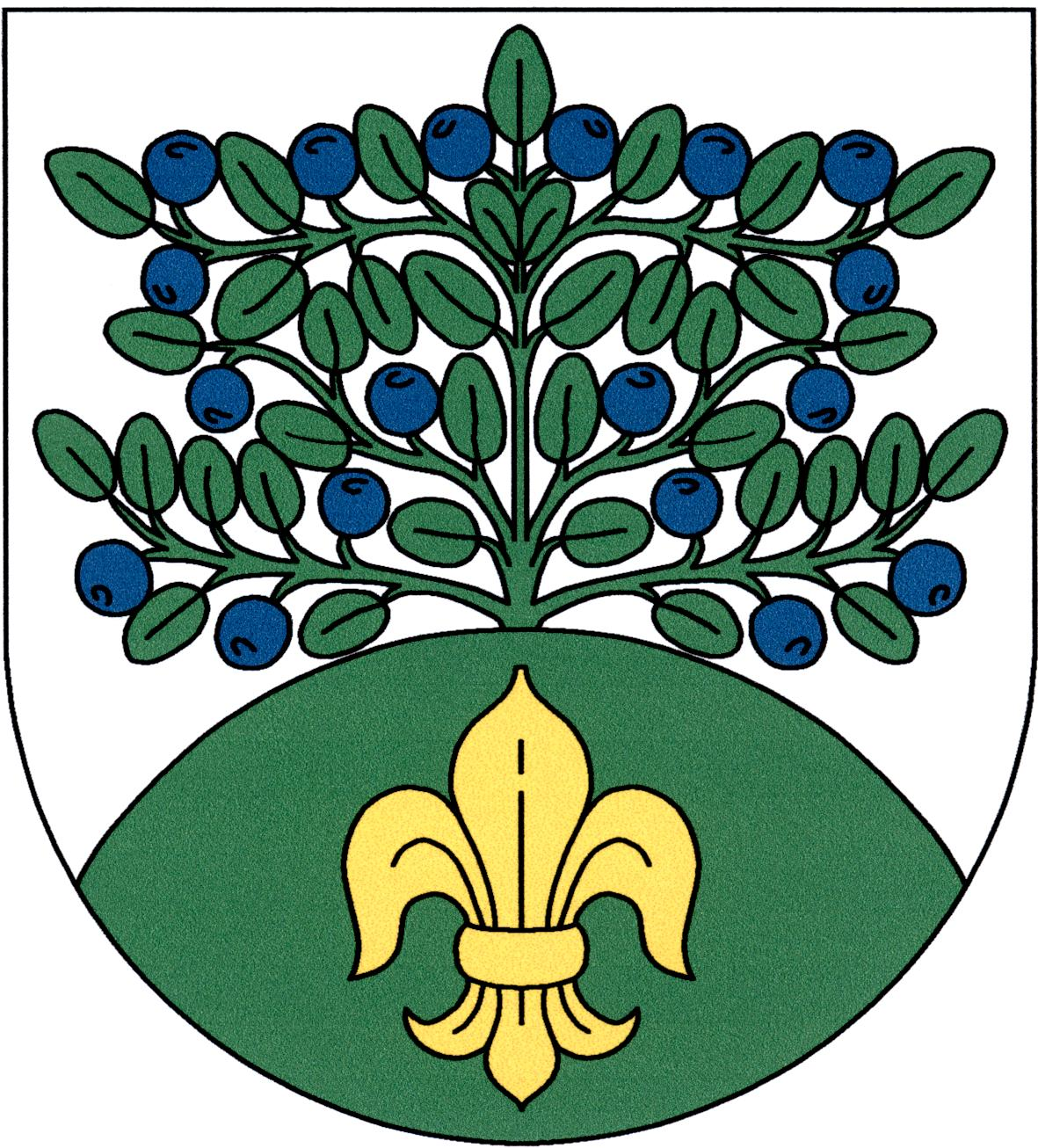
- Flag Coat of arms

- Location in the Czech Republic
- Coordinates: 49°53′14″N 15°55′0″E
- Country: Czech Republic
- Region: Pardubice
- District: Chrudim
- First mentioned: 1452

Area
  - Total: 10.00 km^{2} (3.86 sq mi)
- Elevation: 300 m (980 ft)

Population (2026-01-01)
  - Total: 445
  - Density: 44.5/km^{2} (115/sq mi)
- Time zone: UTC+1 (CET)
  - Summer (DST): UTC+2 (CEST)
- Postal code: 538 51
- Website: www.horka.info

Horka is a municipality and village in Chrudim District in the Pardubice Region of the Czech Republic. It has about 400 inhabitants.

== Administrative division ==
Horka consists of four municipal parts (in brackets population according to the 2021 census):

- Horka (325)
- Hlína (69)
- Mezihoří (16)
- Silnice (13)

== Demographics ==
Historical population
Year	Pop.	±%
1869	759	—
1880	803	+5.8%
1890	765	−4.7%
1900	751	−1.8%
1910	799	+6.4%
1921	750	−6.1%
1930	837	+11.6%
1950	610	−27.1%
1961	560	−8.2%
1970	512	−8.6%
1980	439	−14.3%
1991	384	−12.5%
2001	373	−2.9%
2011	410	+9.9%
2021	423	+3.2%
Source: Censuses
