= Střemošice =

- Municipality
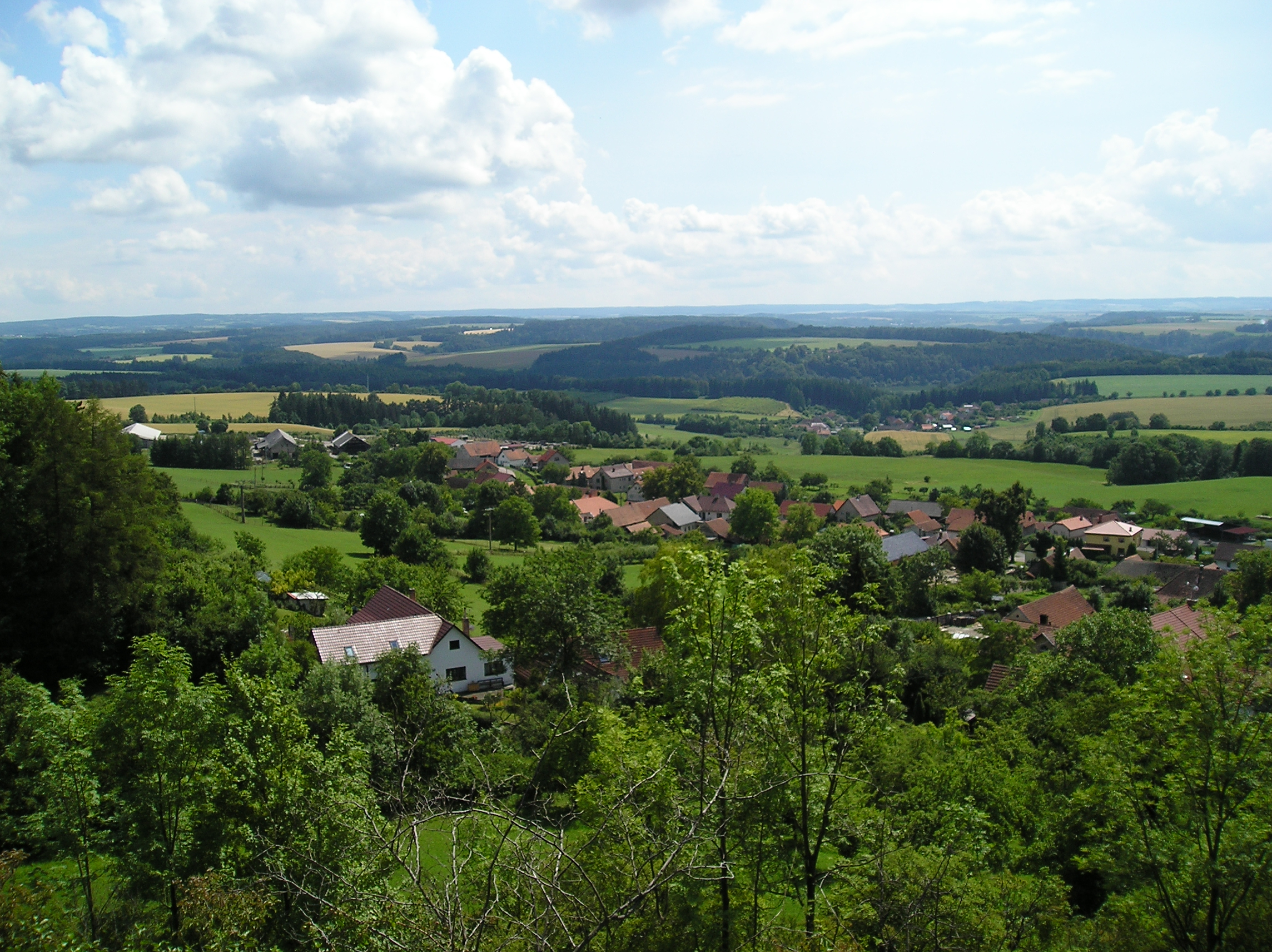
- View from the north

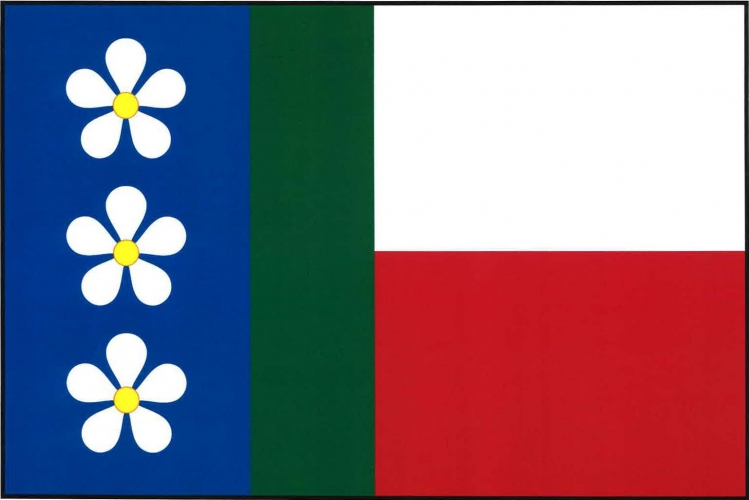
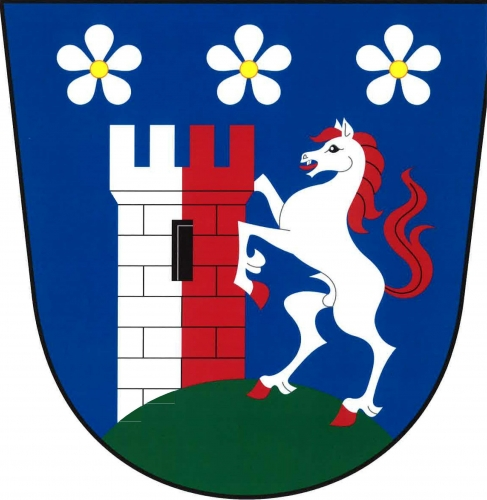
- Flag Coat of arms

- Location in the Czech Republic
- Coordinates: 49°53′30″N 16°4′20″E
- Country: Czech Republic
- Region: Pardubice
- District: Chrudim
- First mentioned: 1559

Area
  - Total: 4.27 km^{2} (1.65 sq mi)
- Elevation: 394 m (1,293 ft)

Population (2026-01-01)
  - Total: 193
  - Density: 45.2/km^{2} (117/sq mi)
- Time zone: UTC+1 (CET)
  - Summer (DST): UTC+2 (CEST)
- Postal code: 538 54
- Website: www.stremosice.cz

Střemošice is a municipality and village in Chrudim District in the Pardubice Region of the Czech Republic. It has about 200 inhabitants.

== Administrative division ==
Střemošice consists of two municipal parts (in brackets population according to the 2021 census):

- Střemošice (103)
- Bílý Kůň (58)

== Demographics ==
Historical population
Year	Pop.	±%
1869	556	—
1880	504	−9.4%
1890	457	−9.3%
1900	469	+2.6%
1910	521	+11.1%
1921	497	−4.6%
1930	450	−9.5%
1950	376	−16.4%
1961	355	−5.6%
1970	287	−19.2%
1980	267	−7.0%
1991	225	−15.7%
2001	199	−11.6%
2011	169	−15.1%
2021	161	−4.7%
Source: Censuses
