= Trojovice =

- Municipality
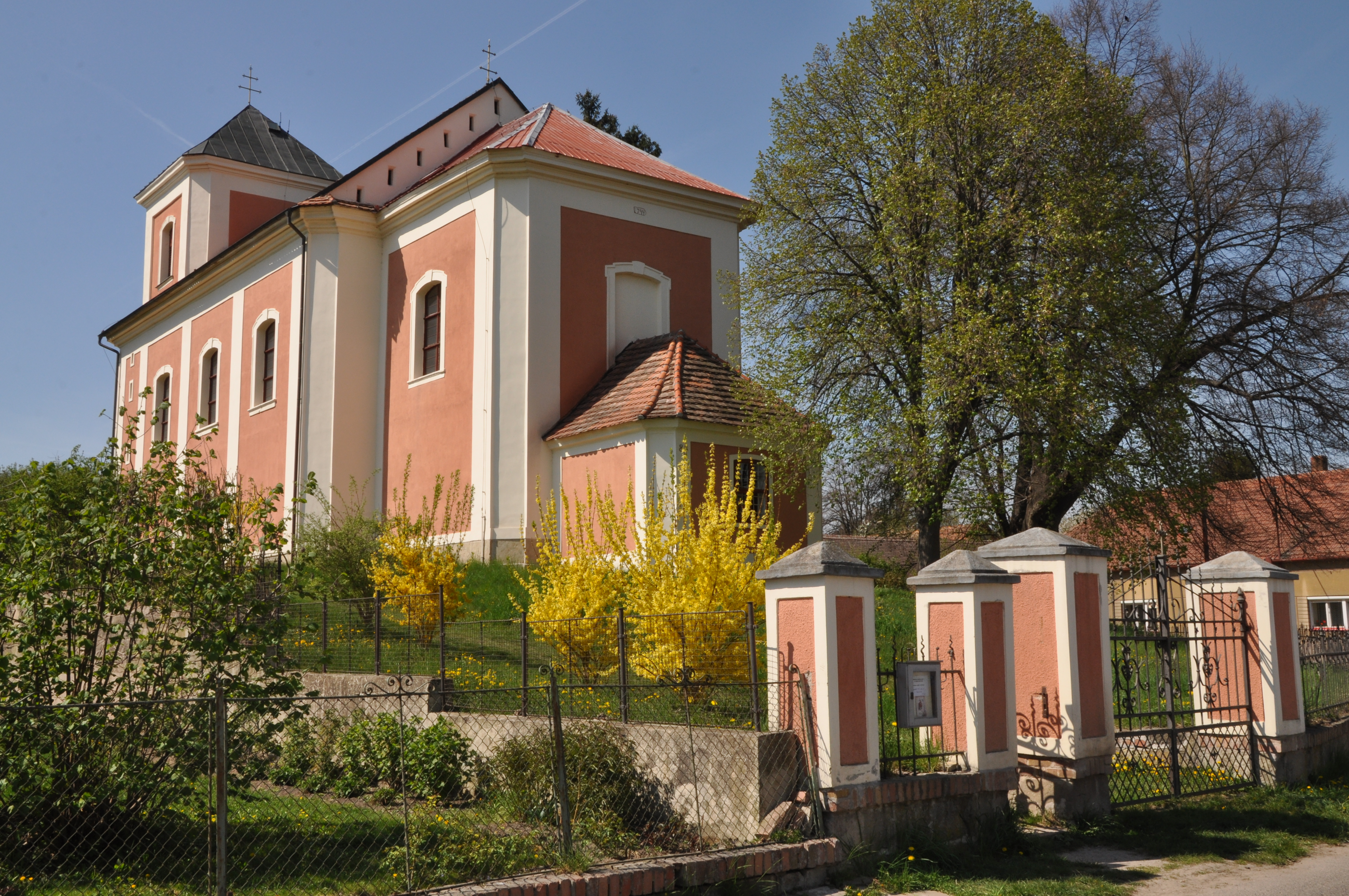
- Church of Saint Michael the Archangel

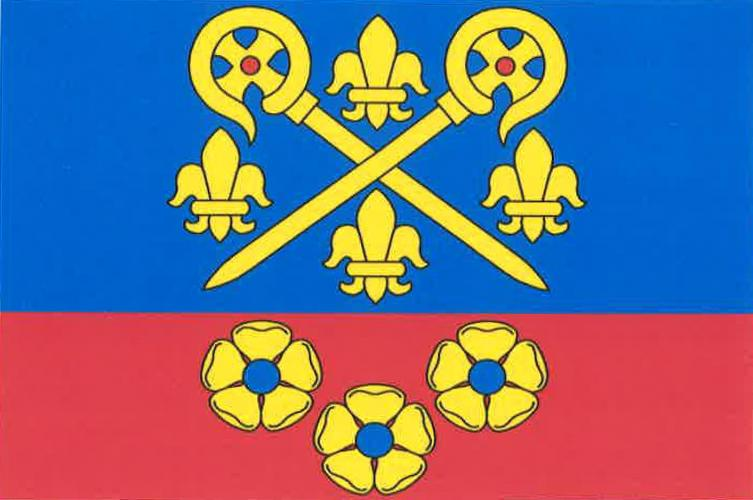
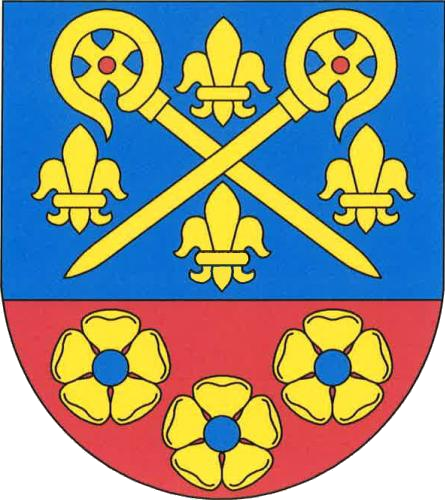
- Flag Coat of arms

- Location in the Czech Republic
- Coordinates: 49°55′58″N 15°55′11″E
- Country: Czech Republic
- Region: Pardubice
- District: Chrudim
- First mentioned: 1244

Area
  - Total: 2.73 km^{2} (1.05 sq mi)
- Elevation: 252 m (827 ft)

Population (2026-01-01)
  - Total: 179
  - Density: 65.6/km^{2} (170/sq mi)
- Time zone: UTC+1 (CET)
  - Summer (DST): UTC+2 (CEST)
- Postal code: 538 33
- Website: www.trojovice.cz

Trojovice is a municipality and village in Chrudim District in the Pardubice Region of the Czech Republic. It has about 200 inhabitants.

== Demographics ==
Historical population
Year	Pop.	±%
1869	373	—
1880	396	+6.2%
1890	401	+1.3%
1900	381	−5.0%
1910	404	+6.0%
1921	373	−7.7%
1930	335	−10.2%
1950	270	−19.4%
1961	271	+0.4%
1970	247	−8.9%
1980	217	−12.1%
1991	186	−14.3%
2001	194	+4.3%
2011	191	−1.5%
2021	180	−5.8%
Source: Censuses
