= Sobětuchy =

- Municipality
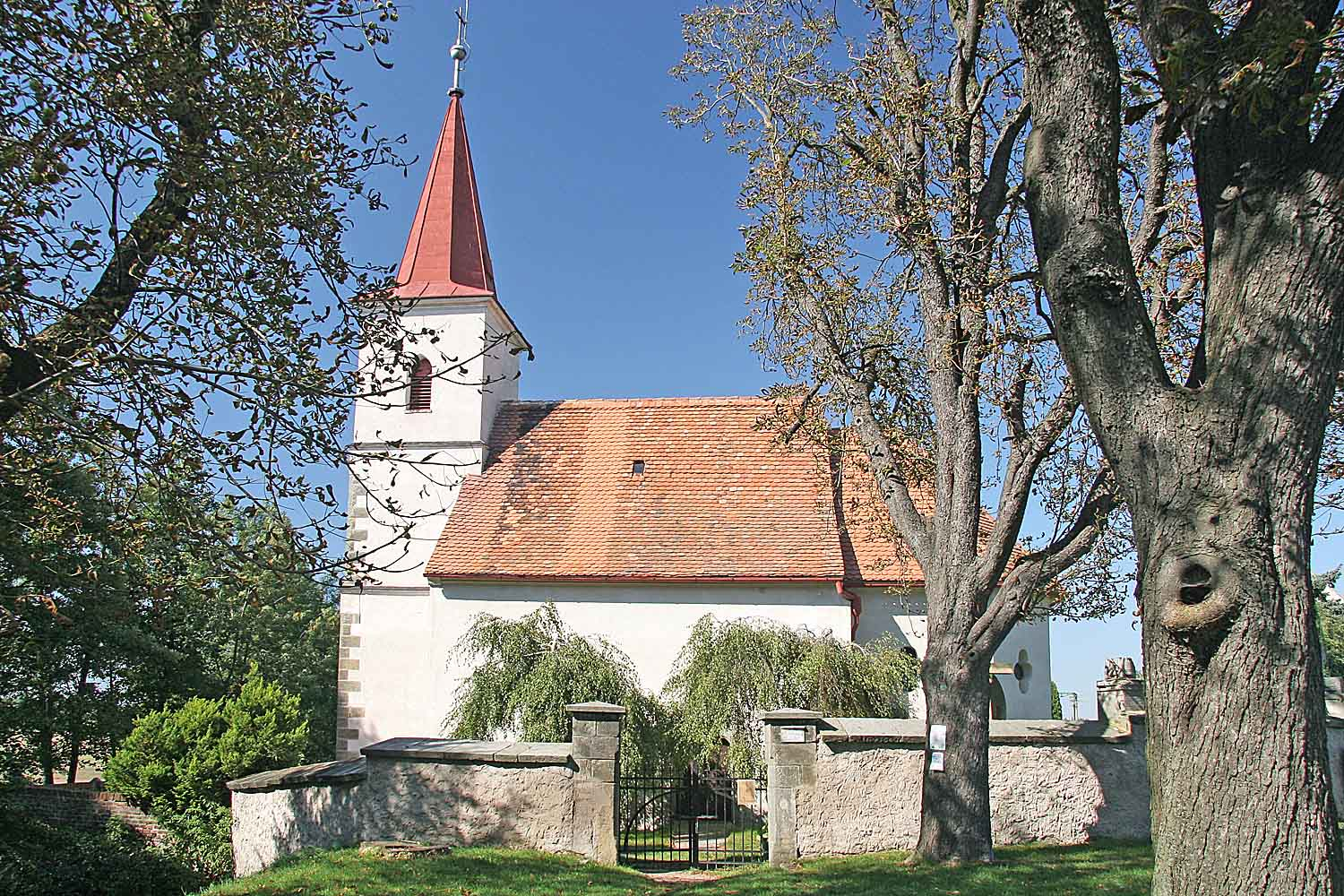
- Church of the Holy Trinity

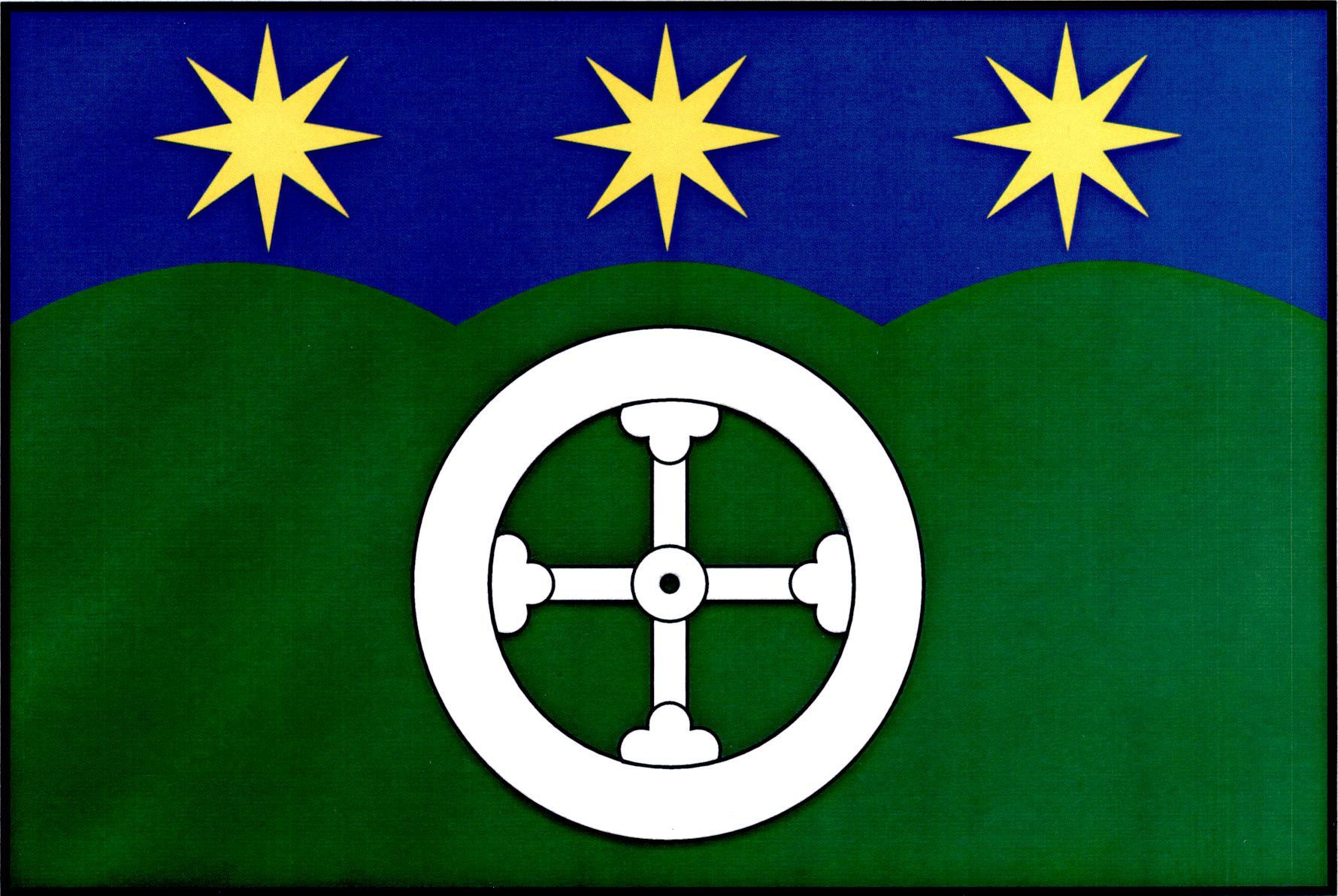
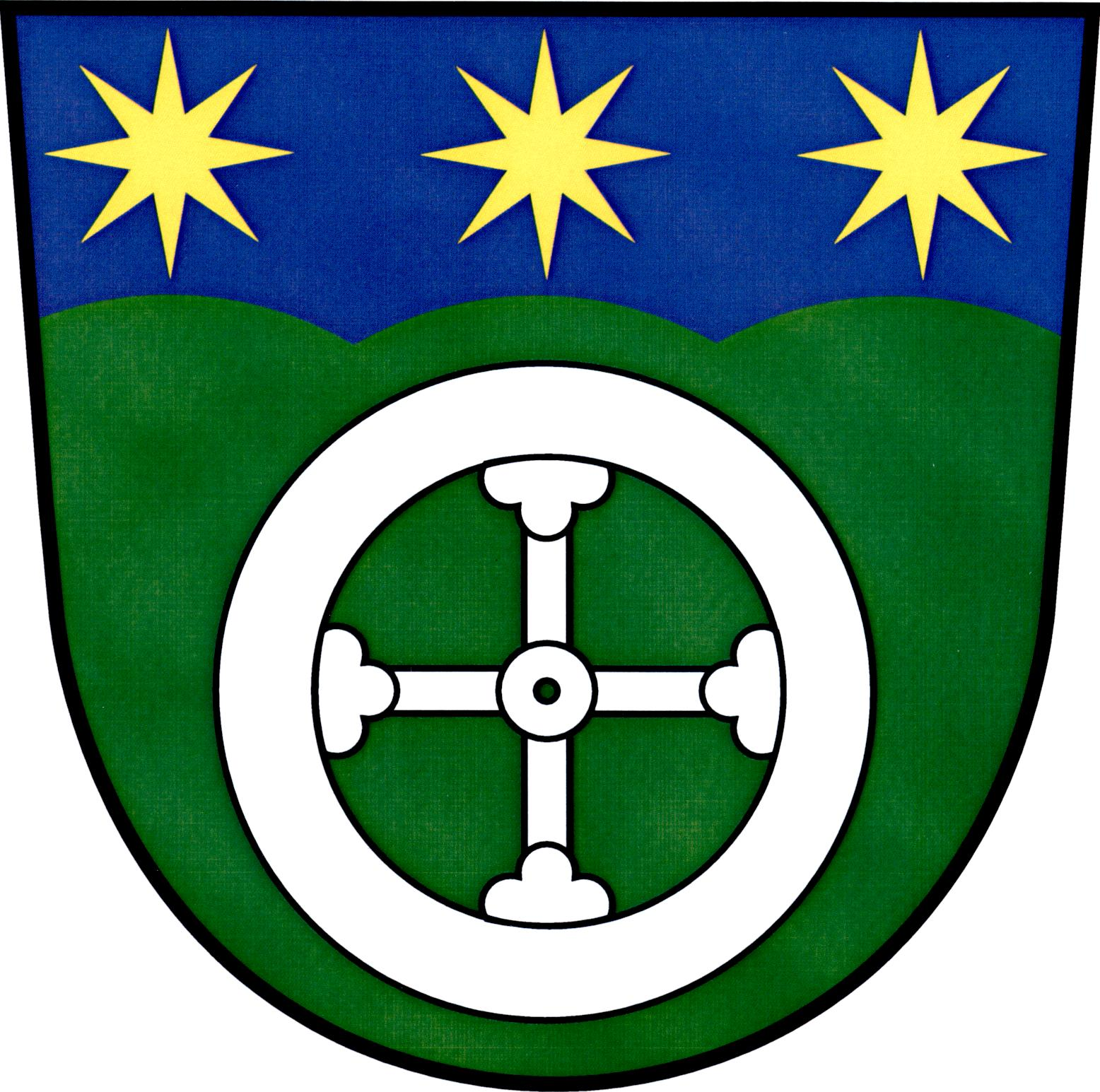
- Flag Coat of arms

- Location in the Czech Republic
- Coordinates: 49°55′53″N 15°45′48″E
- Country: Czech Republic
- Region: Pardubice
- District: Chrudim
- First mentioned: 1272

Area
  - Total: 3.82 km^{2} (1.47 sq mi)
- Elevation: 285 m (935 ft)

Population (2026-01-01)
  - Total: 986
  - Density: 258/km^{2} (669/sq mi)
- Time zone: UTC+1 (CET)
  - Summer (DST): UTC+2 (CEST)
- Postal code: 537 01
- Website: www.sobetuchy.cz

Sobětuchy is a municipality and village in Chrudim District in the Pardubice Region of the Czech Republic. It has about 1,000 inhabitants.

== Administrative division ==
Sobětuchy consists of three municipal parts (in brackets population according to the 2021 census):

- Sobětuchy (388)
- Pouchobrady (54)
- Vrcha (581)

== Demographics ==
Historical population
Year	Pop.	±%
1869	524	—
1880	534	+1.9%
1890	596	+11.6%
1900	532	−10.7%
1910	560	+5.3%
1921	323	−42.3%
1930	559	+73.1%
1950	267	−52.2%
1961	384	+43.8%
1970	375	−2.3%
1980	451	+20.3%
1991	496	+10.0%
2001	539	+8.7%
2011	837	+55.3%
2021	1,023	+22.2%
Source: Censuses
