= Čankovice =

- Municipality
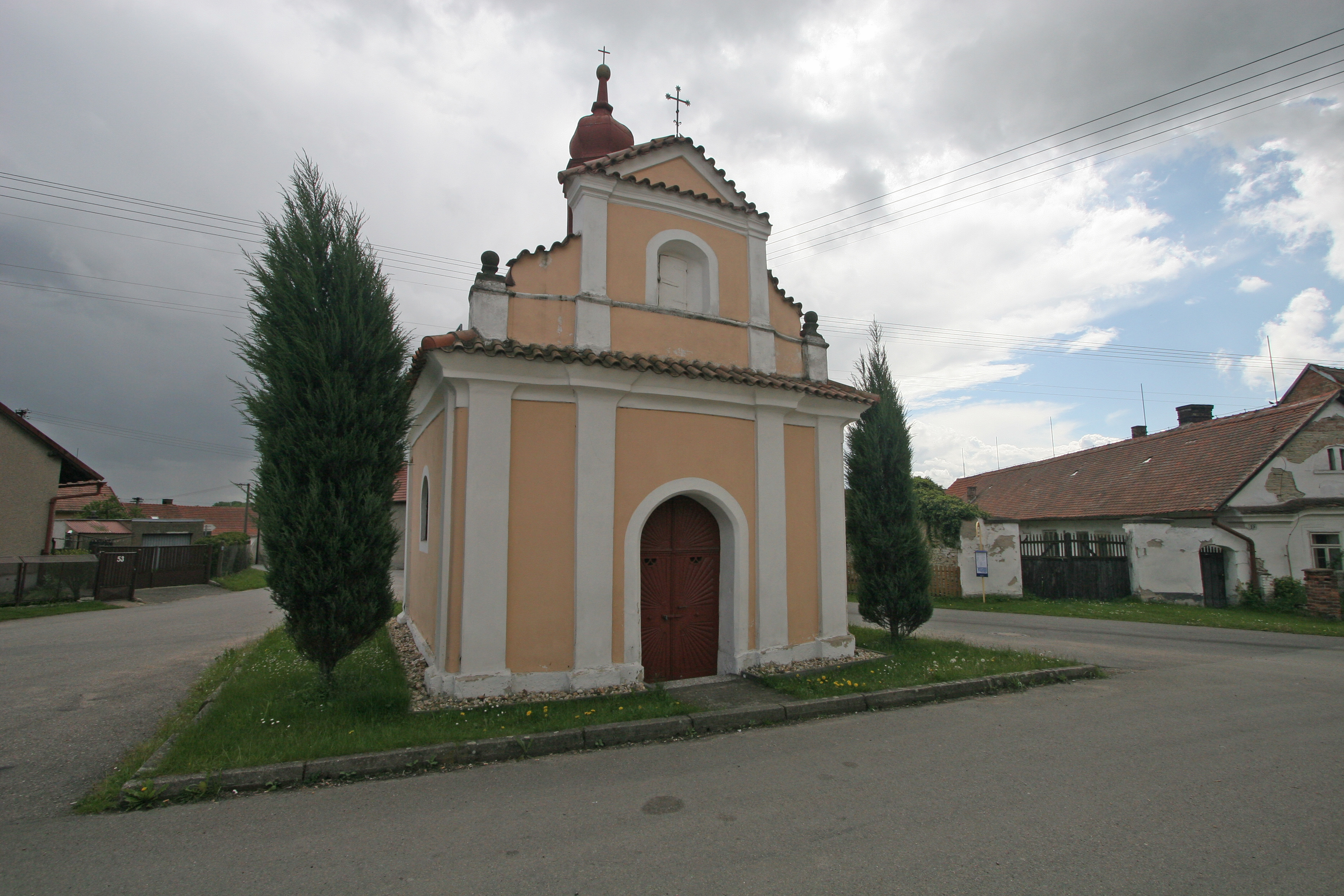
- Chapel of the Transfiguration of the Lord

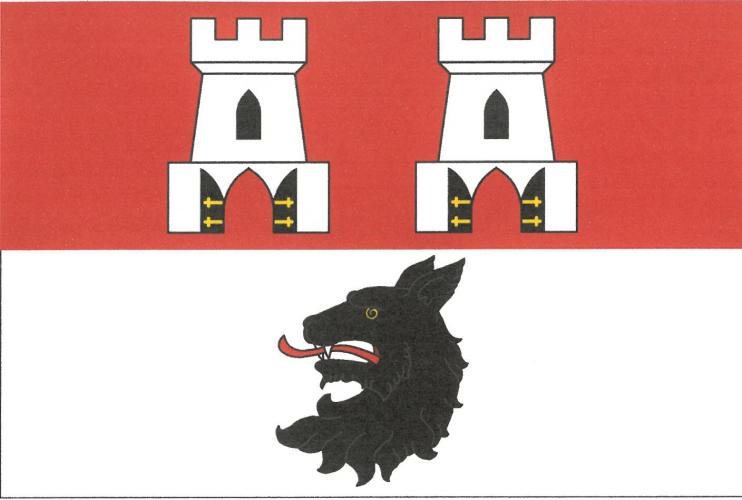
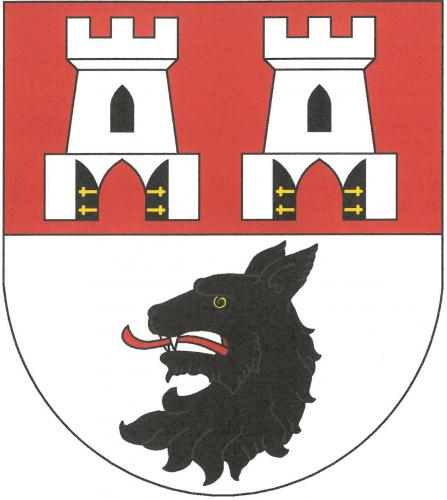
- Flag Coat of arms

- Location in the Czech Republic
- Coordinates: 49°57′49″N 15°56′14″E
- Country: Czech Republic
- Region: Pardubice
- District: Chrudim
- First mentioned: 1293

Area
  - Total: 4.19 km^{2} (1.62 sq mi)
- Elevation: 245 m (804 ft)

Population (2026-01-01)
  - Total: 511
  - Density: 122/km^{2} (316/sq mi)
- Time zone: UTC+1 (CET)
  - Summer (DST): UTC+2 (CEST)
- Postal code: 538 62
- Website: www.cankovice.eu

Čankovice is a municipality and village in Chrudim District in the Pardubice Region of the Czech Republic. It has about 500 inhabitants.

== Demographics ==
Historical population
Year	Pop.	±%
1869	442	—
1880	490	+10.9%
1890	496	+1.2%
1900	480	−3.2%
1910	507	+5.6%
1921	489	−3.6%
1930	506	+3.5%
1950	340	−32.8%
1961	340	+0.0%
1970	312	−8.2%
1980	290	−7.1%
1991	284	−2.1%
2001	338	+19.0%
2011	296	−12.4%
2021	377	+27.4%
Source: Censuses
