= Kněžice (Chrudim District) =

- Municipality
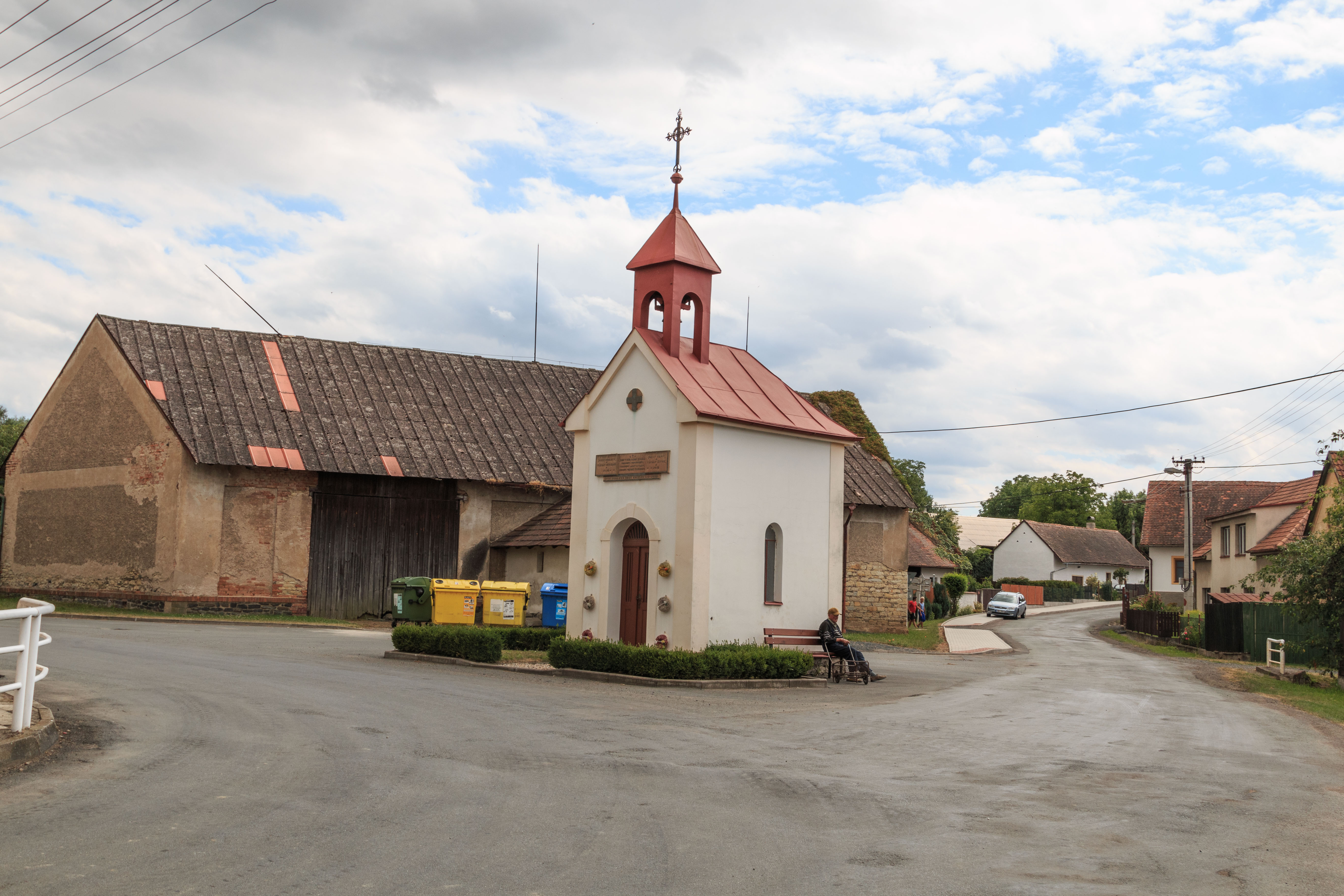
- Chapel of the Holy Cross

- Location in the Czech Republic
- Coordinates: 49°51′43″N 15°31′39″E
- Country: Czech Republic
- Region: Pardubice
- District: Chrudim
- First mentioned: 1437

Area
  - Total: 4.60 km^{2} (1.78 sq mi)
- Elevation: 312 m (1,024 ft)

Population (2026-01-01)
  - Total: 139
  - Density: 30.2/km^{2} (78.3/sq mi)
- Time zone: UTC+1 (CET)
  - Summer (DST): UTC+2 (CEST)
- Postal code: 538 43
- Website: www.kneziceuronova.cz

Kněžice is a municipality and village in Chrudim District in the Pardubice Region of the Czech Republic. It has about 100 inhabitants.

== Demographics ==
Historical population
Year	Pop.	±%
1869	347	—
1880	354	+2.0%
1890	372	+5.1%
1900	371	−0.3%
1910	373	+0.5%
1921	349	−6.4%
1930	327	−6.3%
1950	253	−22.6%
1961	241	−4.7%
1970	251	+4.1%
1980	228	−9.2%
1991	163	−28.5%
2001	145	−11.0%
2011	143	−1.4%
2021	135	−5.6%
Source: Censuses
