= Žlebské Chvalovice =

- Municipality
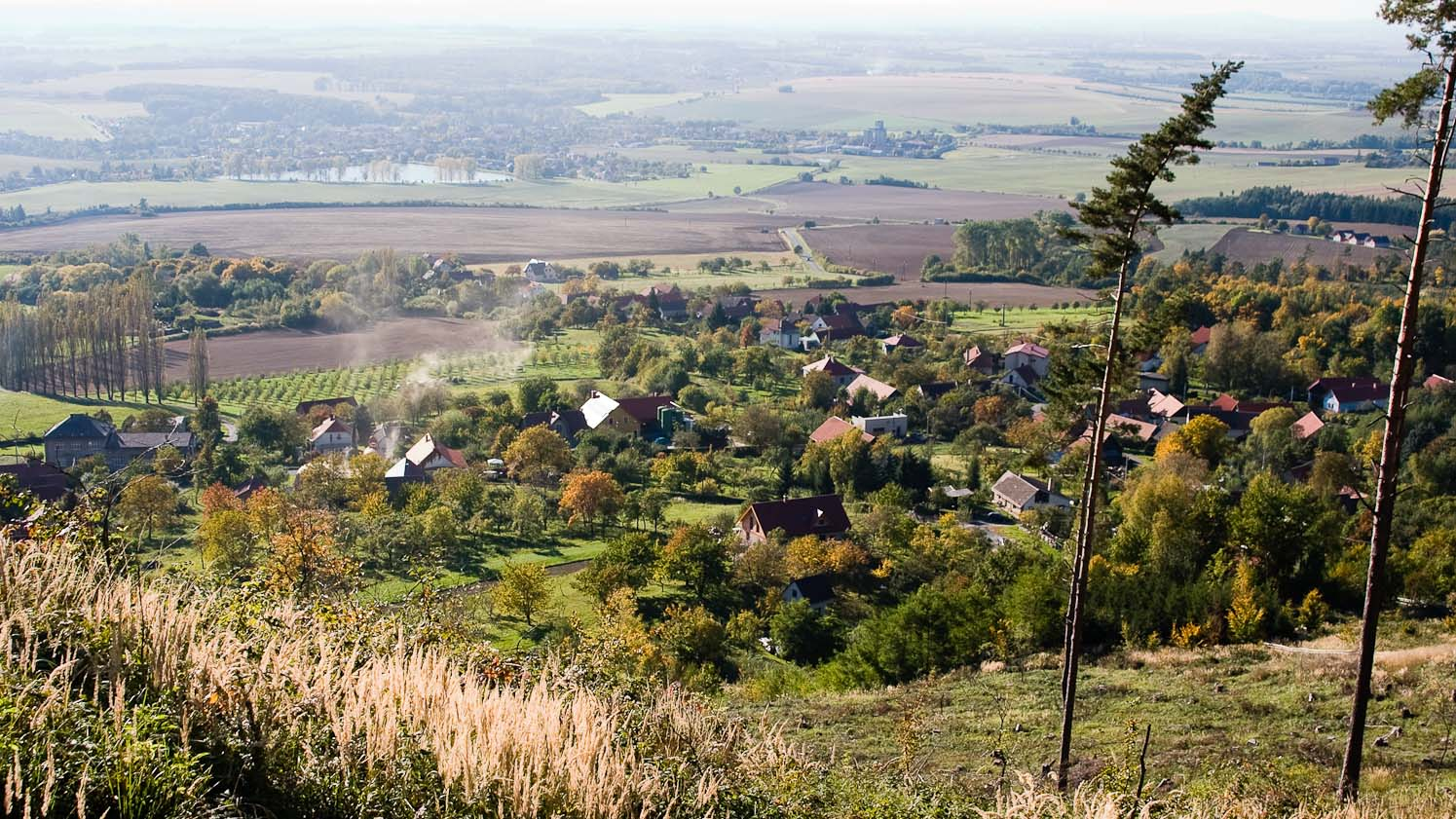
- General view

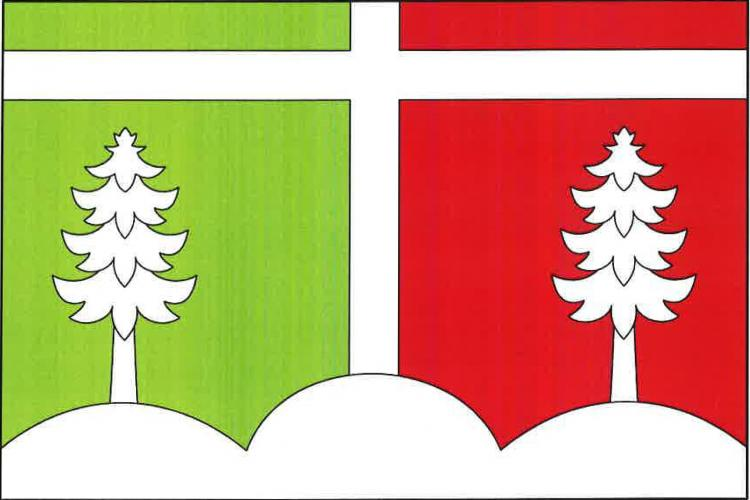
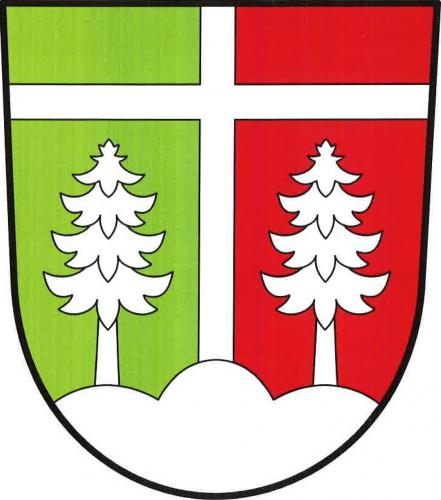
- Flag Coat of arms

- Location in the Czech Republic
- Coordinates: 49°53′34″N 15°34′0″E
- Country: Czech Republic
- Region: Pardubice
- District: Chrudim
- First mentioned: 1391

Area
  - Total: 3.59 km^{2} (1.39 sq mi)
- Elevation: 385 m (1,263 ft)

Population (2026-01-01)
  - Total: 137
  - Density: 38.2/km^{2} (98.8/sq mi)
- Time zone: UTC+1 (CET)
  - Summer (DST): UTC+2 (CEST)
- Postal code: 538 43
- Website: www.zlebskechvalovice.eu

Žlebské Chvalovice is a municipality and village in Chrudim District in the Pardubice Region of the Czech Republic. It has about 100 inhabitants.

== Administrative division ==
Žlebské Chvalovice consists of two municipal parts (in brackets population according to the 2021 census):

- Žlebské Chvalovice (121)
- Žlebská Lhotka (19)

== Demographics ==
Historical population
Year	Pop.	±%
1869	373	—
1880	422	+13.1%
1890	415	−1.7%
1900	444	+7.0%
1910	490	+10.4%
1921	476	−2.9%
1930	456	−4.2%
1950	416	−8.8%
1961	365	−12.3%
1970	307	−15.9%
1980	200	−34.9%
1991	115	−42.5%
2001	88	−23.5%
2011	94	+6.8%
2021	140	+48.9%
Source: Censuses
