= Řestoky =

- Municipality
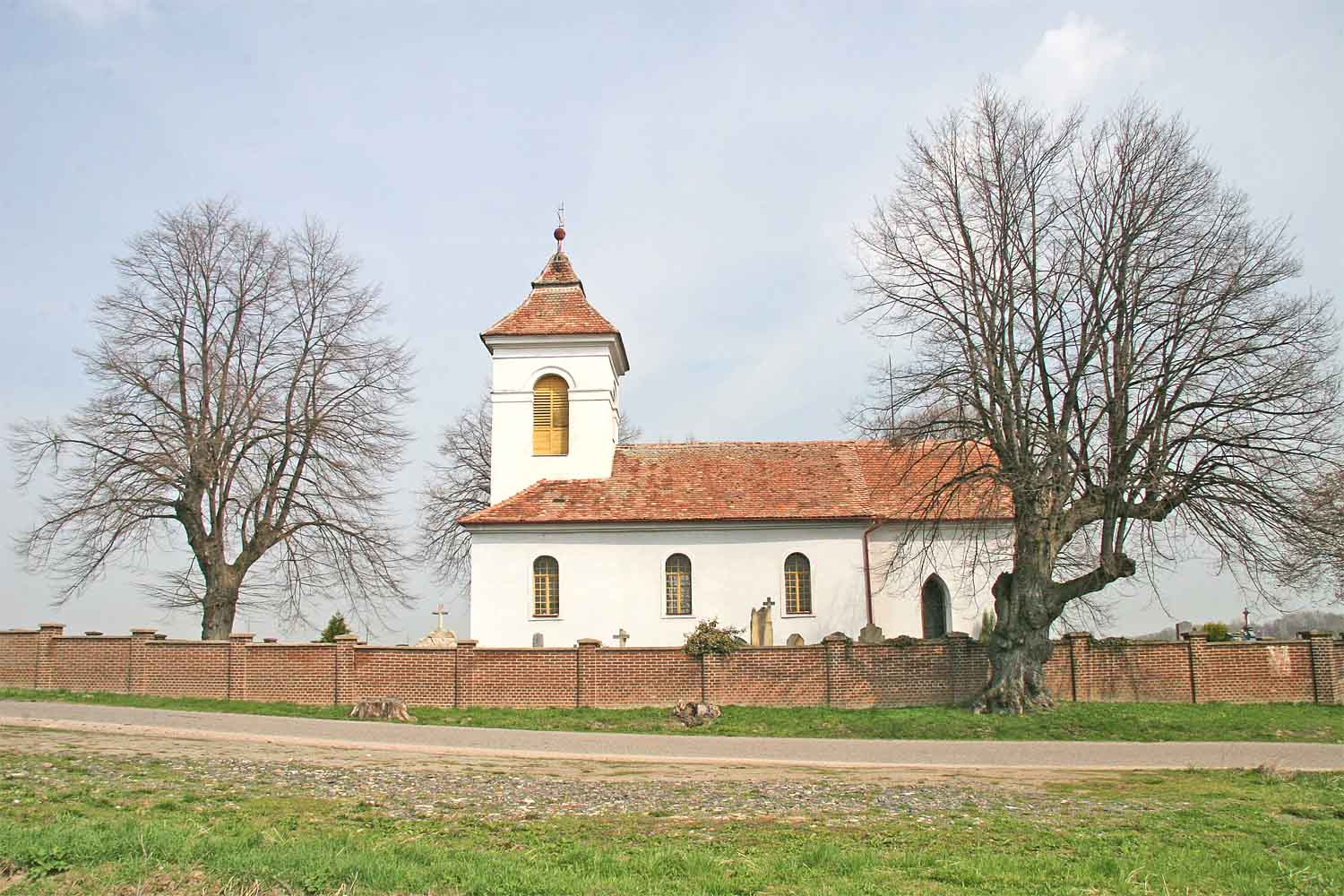
- Church of Saint Wenceslaus

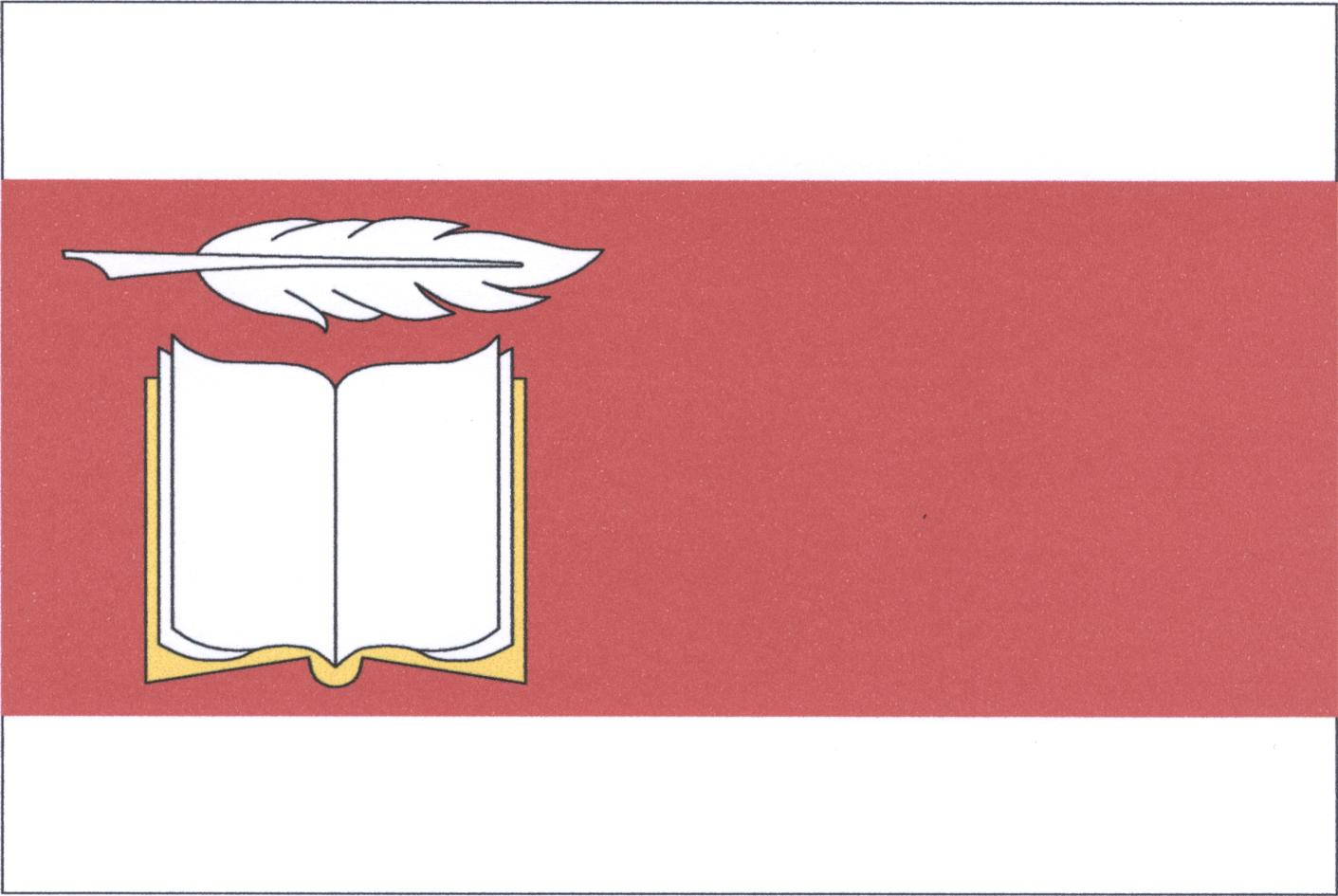
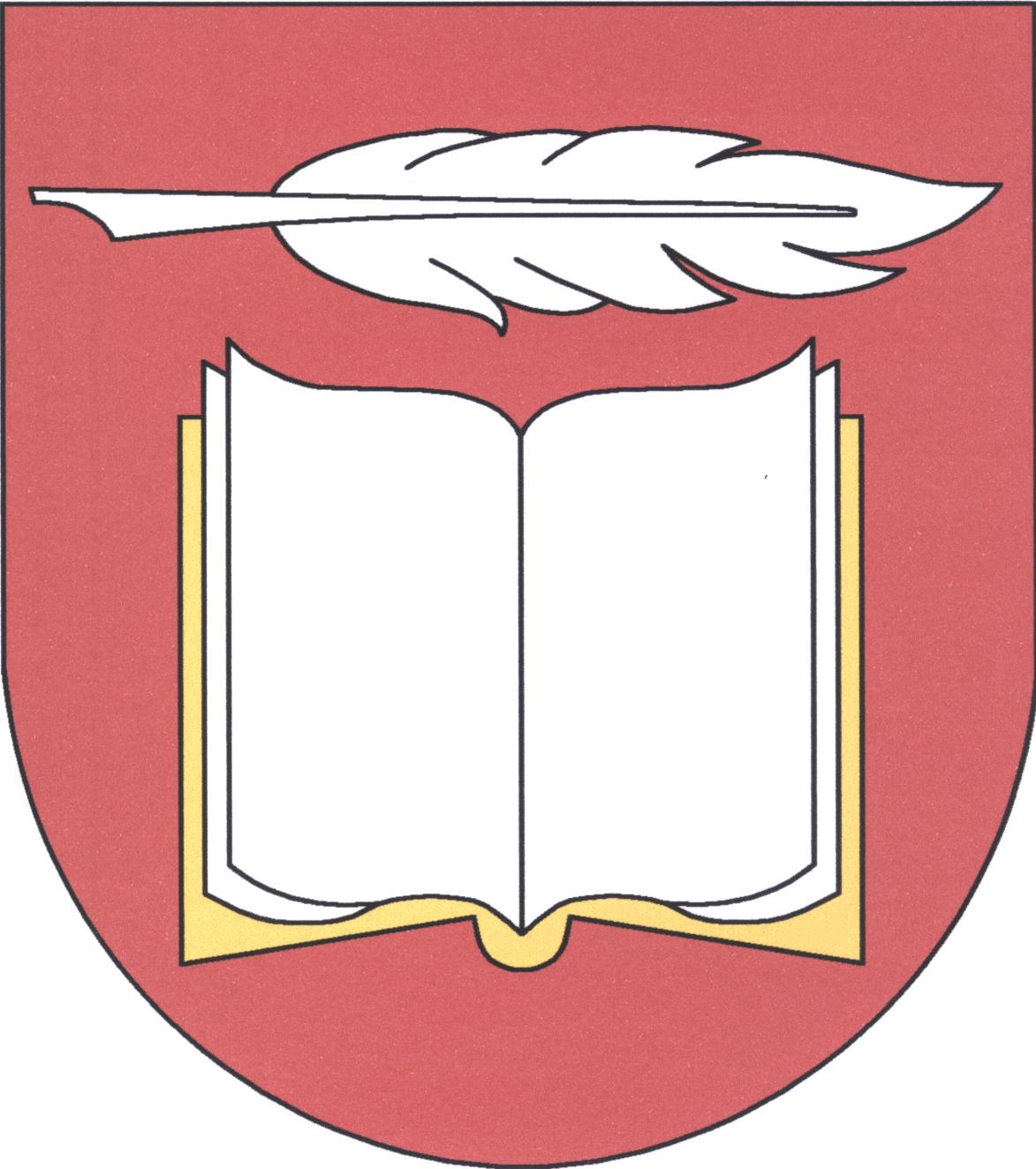
- Flag Coat of arms

- Location in the Czech Republic
- Coordinates: 49°55′21″N 15°55′0″E
- Country: Czech Republic
- Region: Pardubice
- District: Chrudim
- First mentioned: 1115

Area
  - Total: 3.91 km^{2} (1.51 sq mi)
- Elevation: 258 m (846 ft)

Population (2026-01-01)
  - Total: 470
  - Density: 120/km^{2} (310/sq mi)
- Time zone: UTC+1 (CET)
  - Summer (DST): UTC+2 (CEST)
- Postal code: 538 51
- Website: www.restoky.cz

Řestoky is a municipality and village in Chrudim District in the Pardubice Region of the Czech Republic. It has about 500 inhabitants.

== Demographics ==
Historical population
Year	Pop.	±%
1869	420	—
1880	484	+15.2%
1890	519	+7.2%
1900	486	−6.4%
1910	515	+6.0%
1921	586	+13.8%
1930	564	−3.8%
1950	462	−18.1%
1961	490	+6.1%
1970	479	−2.2%
1980	491	+2.5%
1991	460	−6.3%
2001	463	+0.7%
2011	475	+2.6%
2021	481	+1.3%
Source: Censuses
