= Chrudimka =

River in the Pardubice Region, Czech Republic

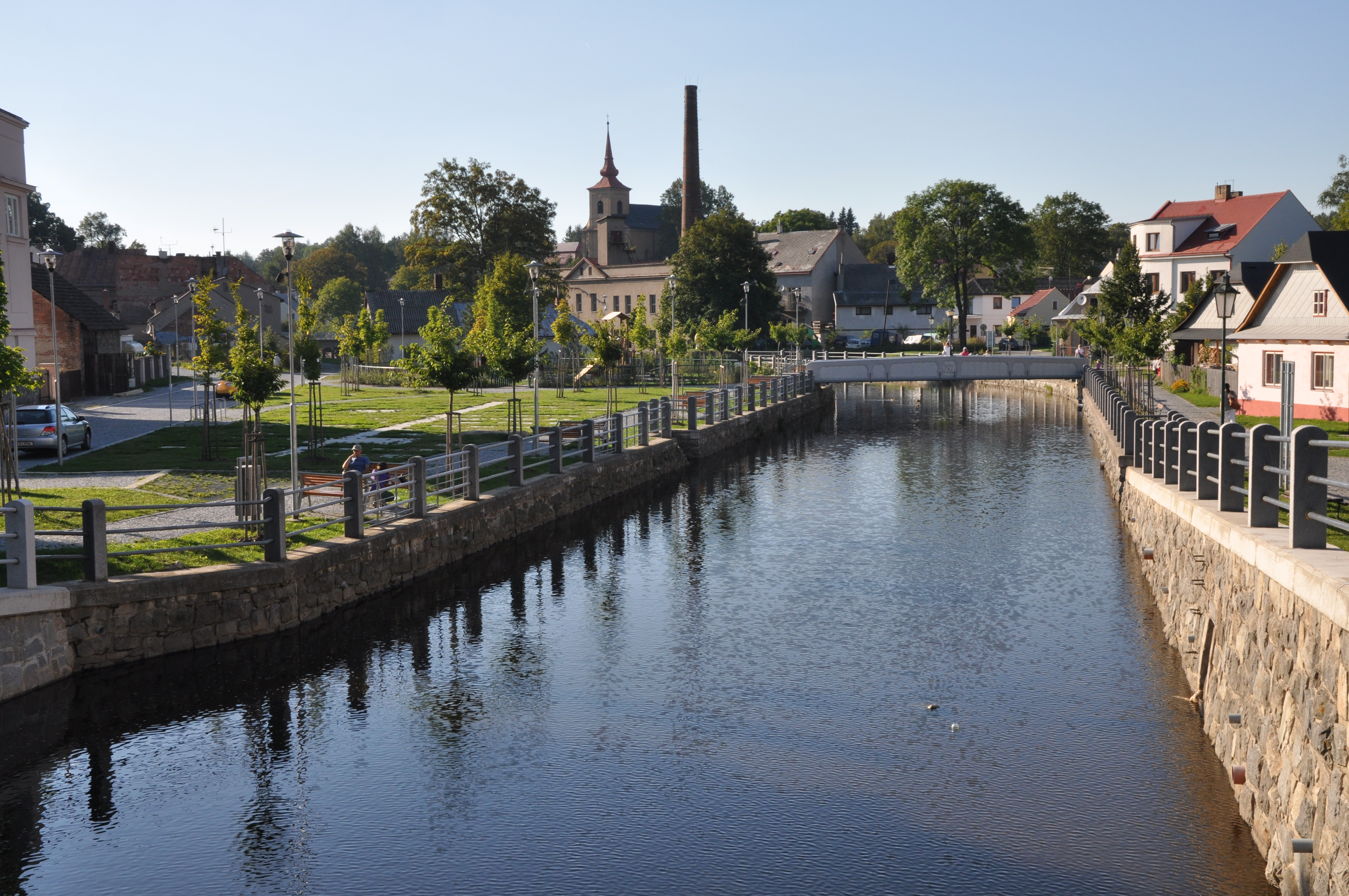
- The Chrudimka in Hlinsko

Location
- Country: Czech Republic
- Region: Pardubice

Physical characteristics
- Source
  - location: Krouna, Iron Mountains
  - coordinates: 49°44′16″N 16°0′43″E
  - elevation: 705 m (2,313 ft)
- Mouth
  - location: Elbe
  - coordinates: 50°2′40″N 15°46′37″E
  - elevation: 216 m (709 ft)
- Length: 106.0 km (65.9 mi)
- Basin size: 866.2 km^{2} (334.4 sq mi)
- Discharge
  - average: 6.02 m^{3}/s (213 cu ft/s) near estuary

Basin features
- Progression: Elbe→ North Sea

The Chrudimka (Czech pronunciation: [ˈxruɟɪmka]) is a river in the Czech Republic, a left tributary of the Elbe River. It flows through the Pardubice Region. It is 106.0 km (65.9 mi) long, making it the 18th longest river in the Czech Republic.

== Etymology ==
The river is named after the town of Chrudim. The initial name of the river was Kamenice (from kamenný, i.e. 'stony'), which referred to the character of the rived bed. This name was first documented in 1146. The middle course of the river was alternatively called Ohebka (from oheb = 'bend'). The lower course of the river was also called Pardubská řeka ('Pardubice river') or Městská řeka ('city river'). Around 1697, the name of the entire river was standardised to Chrudimka.

== Characteristic ==
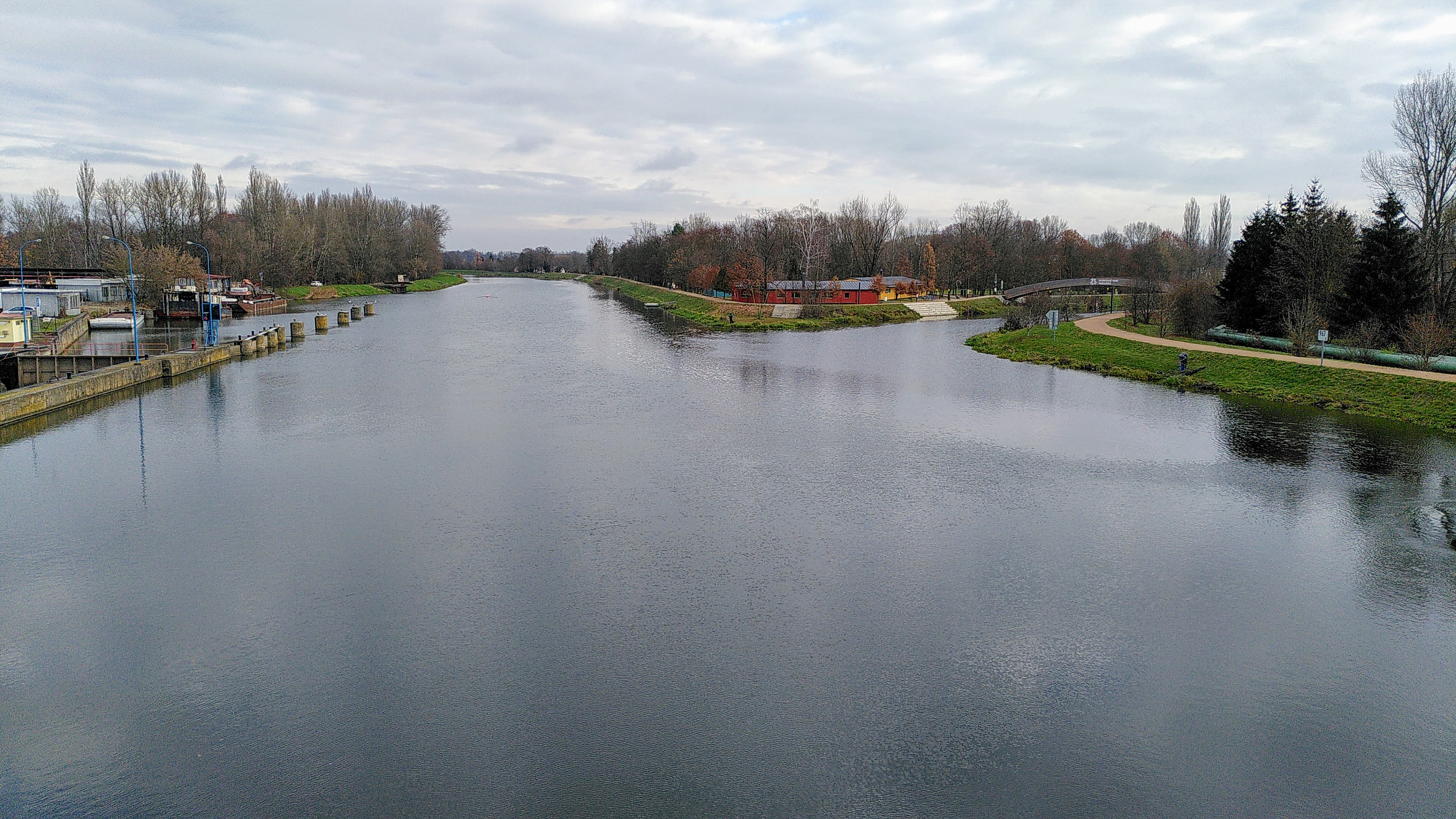
Confluence of the Chrudimka (right) with the Elbe in Pardubice

The Chrudimka originates in Krouna in the Iron Mountains at the elevation of 705 m (2,313 ft) and flows to Pardubice, where it enters the Elbe River at the elevation of 216 m (709 ft). It is 106.0 km (65.9 mi) long, making it the 18th longest river in the Czech Republic. Its drainage basin has an area of 866.2 km^{2} (334.4 sq mi).

The longest tributaries of the Chrudimka are:

| Tributary | Length (km) | River km | Side |
|---|---|---|---|
| Novohradka | 49.2 | 13.8 | right |
| Dlouhý potok | 9.1 | 78.2 | left |
| Okrouhlický potok | 8.9 | 28.5 | left |

== Course ==
The most notable settlement on the river and the final destination before it enters the Elbe is the city of Pardubice. The river flows through the municipal territories of Krouna, Kameničky, Hamry, Hlinsko, Vítanov, Vysočina, Trhová Kamenice, Horní Bradlo, Seč, Bojanov, Libkov, České Lhotice, Svídnice, Slatiňany, Chrudim, Tuněchody, Úhřetice, Úhřetická Lhota and Pardubice.

== Bodies of water ==
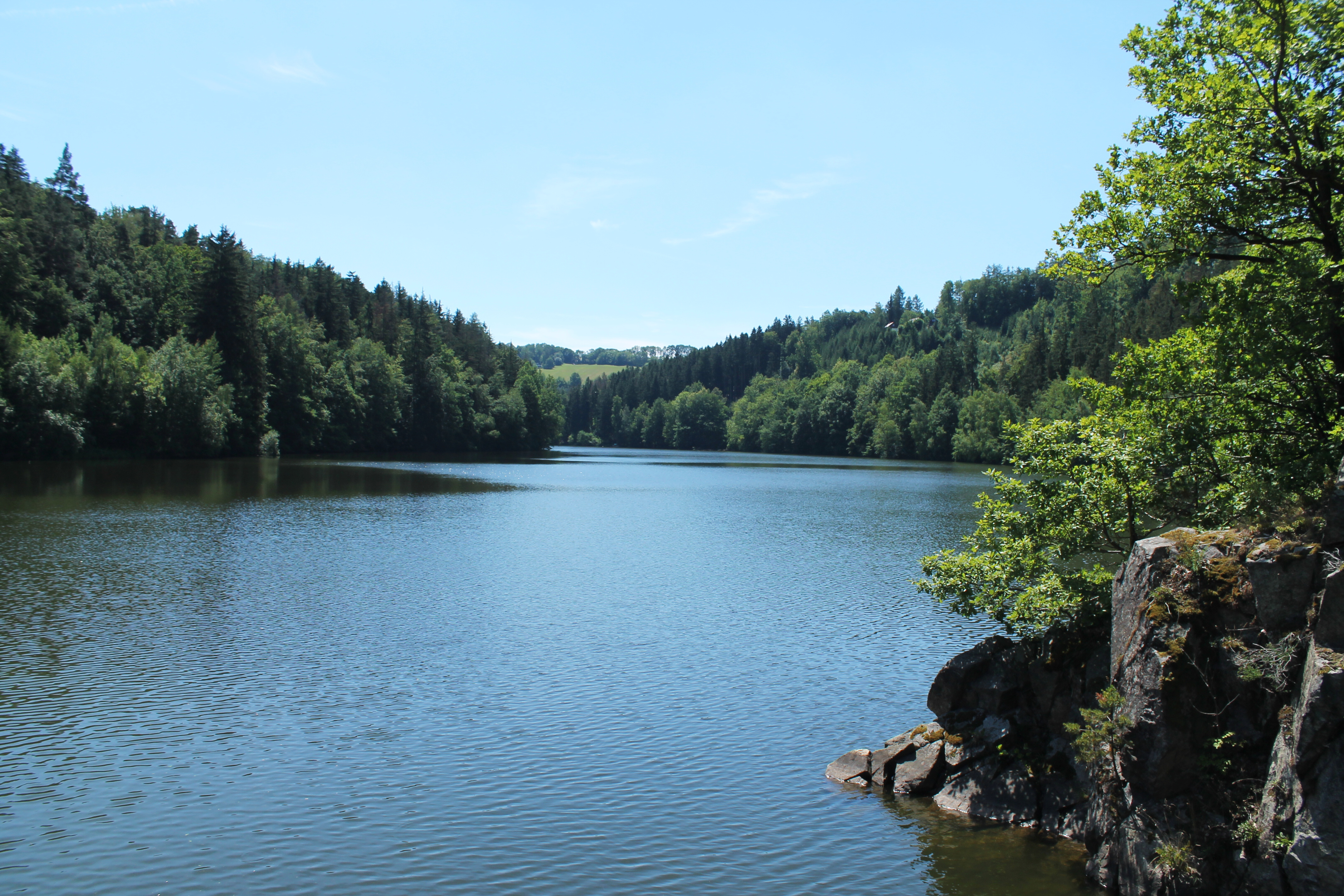
Křižanovice I Reservoir

There are several reservoirs built on the Chrudimka: Hamry, Seč, Seč II, Křižanovice I and Křižanovice II. The largest body of water in the basin area is the Seč Reservoir with an area of 220 ha (540 acres). Its purpose is primarily flood protection, but it is also used for recreation, hydropower generation and water retention in the dry season. There are 83 bodies of water larger than 1 ha in the basin area.

== Fauna ==
The fauna in the river and its immediate surroundings is represented by edible frog, common toad, northern pike, European bullhead, common kingfisher, European otter and European crayfish.

== Economy ==
Before the Křižanovice II Reservoir there is Práčov, the largest hydroelectric power station in the Pardubice Region.

== Tourism ==
Along the course of the river from its source to Chrudim there is an educational trail called Krajem Chrudimky ("through Chrudimka's region"), which is 82 km (51 mi) long.

The Chrudimka is suitable for river tourism. It belongs to the undemanding rivers suitable for beginner paddlers.
