= České Lhotice =

- Municipality
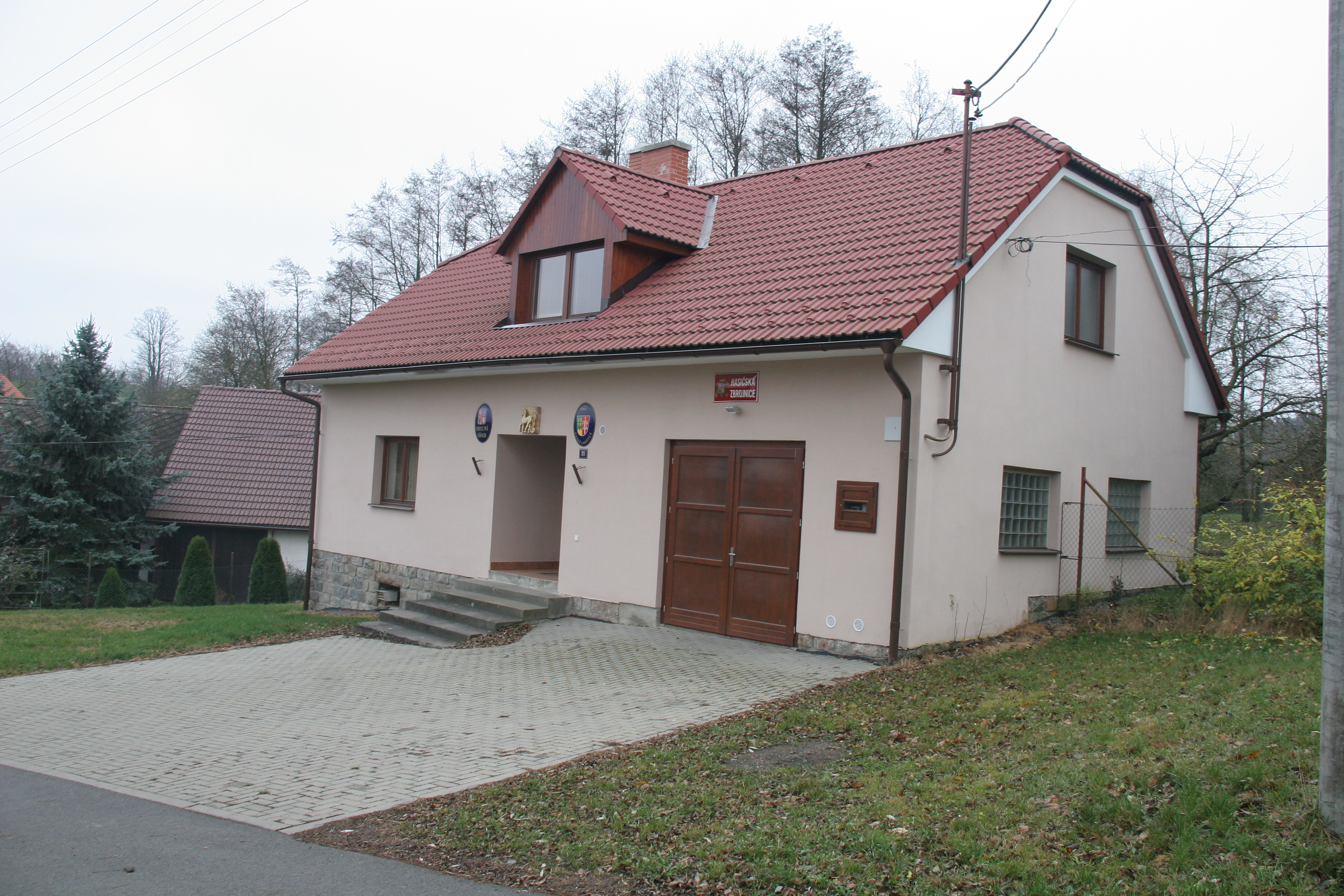
- Municipal office

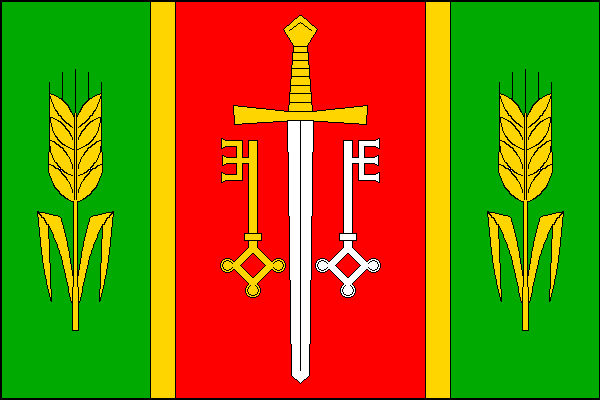
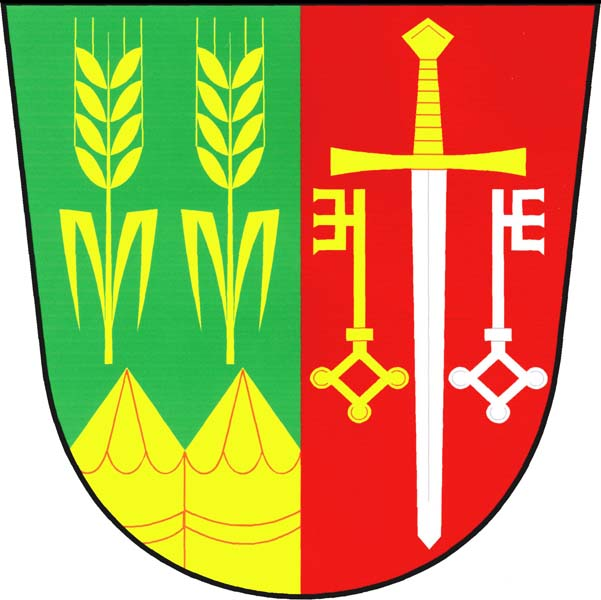
- Flag Coat of arms

- Location in the Czech Republic
- Coordinates: 49°50′49″N 15°46′40″E
- Country: Czech Republic
- Region: Pardubice
- District: Chrudim
- First mentioned: 1329

Area
  - Total: 5.63 km^{2} (2.17 sq mi)
- Elevation: 515 m (1,690 ft)

Population (2026-01-01)
  - Total: 119
  - Density: 21.1/km^{2} (54.7/sq mi)
- Time zone: UTC+1 (CET)
  - Summer (DST): UTC+2 (CEST)
- Postal code: 538 25
- Website: www.ceske-lhotice.cz

České Lhotice is a municipality and village in Chrudim District in the Pardubice Region of the Czech Republic. It has about 100 inhabitants.

== Administrative division ==
České Lhotice consists of two municipal parts (in brackets population according to the 2021 census):

- České Lhotice (68)
- Hradiště (45)

== Etymology ==
The initial name of the village was just Lhotice. The name was derived from the personal name Lhota, meaning 'the village of Lhota's people'. The personal name was derived from Lhota, which is a common Czech toponym, and denoted a person originating from Lhota. From the 16th century, the village was called České Lhotice (meaning 'Czech Lhotices') to distinguing it from the nearby village of the same name that began to be called Německá Lhotice ('German Lhotice'; today Nové Lhotice, part of Liboměřice) Until 1930, the village was divided into two parts, hence the plural form of the name.

== Geography ==
Trhová Kamenice is located about 11 kilometres (7 mi) south of Chrudim and 20 km (12 mi) south of Pardubice. It lies in the Iron Mountains and in the Železné hory Protected Landscape Area. The highest point is at 573 m (1,880 ft) above sea level. The Chrudimka River flows along the northern municipal border. Křižanovice I Reservoir is built here on the river.

== History ==
In the 2nd–1st centuries BC, a Celtic oppidum was located near today's village of Hradiště, on a promontory above the Chrudimka River. The first written mention of České Lhotice is from 1329, when the village was sold to Jindřich of Lichtenburg. For centuries, České Lhotice and Hradiště were small villages. The population began to grow after the declaration of the Patent of Toleration in 1781.

== Demographics ==
Historical population

Year	Pop.	±%
1869	414	—
1880	444	+7.2%
1890	373	−16.0%
1900	351	−5.9%
1910	334	−4.8%

Year	Pop.	±%
1921	339	+1.5%
1930	323	−4.7%
1950	254	−21.4%
1961	229	−9.8%
1970	185	−19.2%

Year	Pop.	±%
1980	152	−17.8%
1991	116	−23.7%
2001	103	−11.2%
2011	94	−8.7%
2021	113	+20.2%

Source: Censuses

== Transport ==
There are no railways or major roads passing through the municipality.

== Sights ==
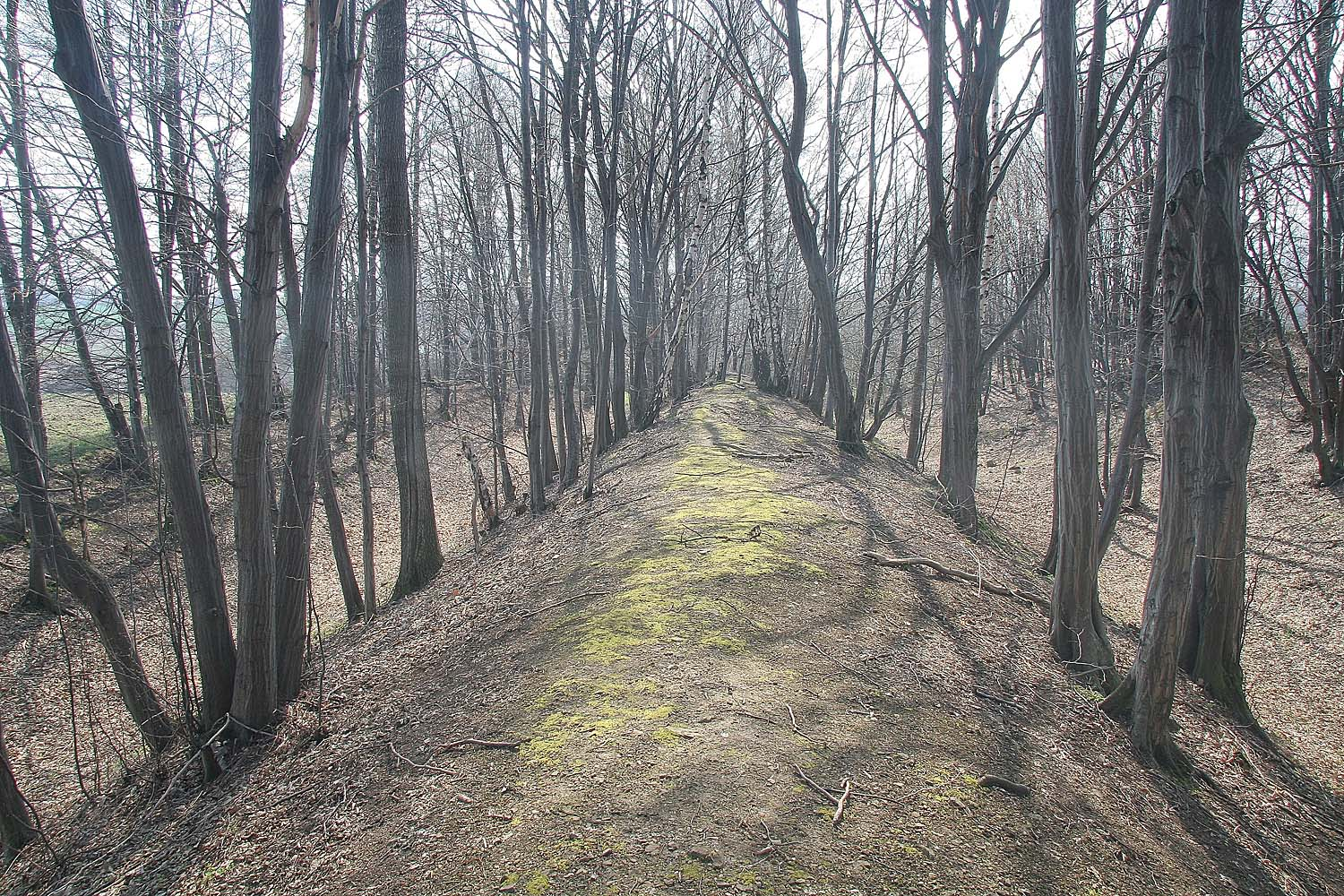
Remains of the oppidum ramparts

The area of the former Celtic oppidum is a valuable archaeological site, protected as a monument reservation. The oppidum was triple-fortified with walls, the highest walls reaching up to 8 m (26 ft). The area of the oppidum is approximately 30 ha (74 acres). Around 50 BC, it was probably abandoned and disappeared.
