= Stolpersteine in Mladá Boleslav =

Memorial installation in Czech Republic

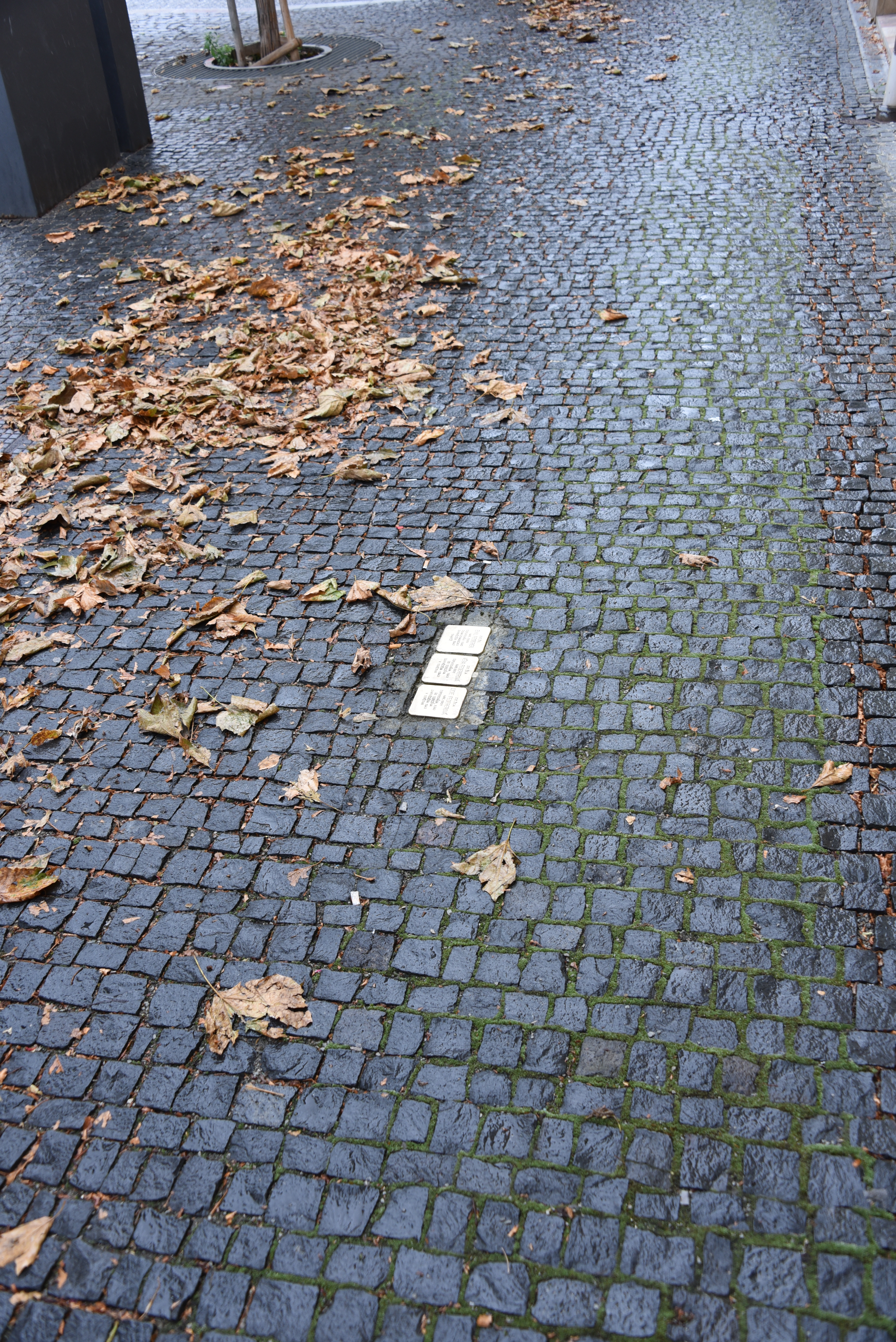
Stolpersteine for family Federer in Mladá Boleslav

This article lists the Stolpersteine in the town of Mladá Boleslav in the Central Bohemian Region (Czech: Středočeský kraj) in the Czech Republic. Stolpersteine is the German name for stumbling blocks collocated all over Europe by German artist Gunter Demnig. They remember the fate of the Nazi victims being murdered, deported, exiled or driven to suicide.

Generally, the stumbling blocks are posed in front of the building where the victims had their last self-chosen residence. The name of the Stolpersteine in Czech is: Kameny zmizelých, stones of the disappeared.

The lists are sortable; the basic order follows the alphabet according to the last name of the victim.

== Mladá Boleslav ==
Stone	Inscription	Location	Life and death
	HERE LIVED; EMIL FEDERER; BORN 1889; DEPORTED 1942; TO MAUTHAUSEN; MURDERED 1942; IBIDEM	Staroměstské nám 96; 50°24′37″N 14°54′06″E	Emil Federer was born on 13 September 1889 in Mladá Boleslav. He graduated from business school, became an accountant and joined the Sokol movement. In the First World War he served in the Austro-Hungarian 36th Infantry Regiment, which was sent to the Galician front against the Russian imperial army. His military duty did not last long, as he was captured on 25 August 1914 at Žolkyjevu by the Russians. Later-on he was merchant in Mladá Boleslav and married to Lidie née Abilovitz, also Lea, Leka or Leha. The couple had a daughter, Vera or Dvora (born in 1921). According to Yad Vashem, he was killed in Auschwitz, but holocaust.cz states, that he was murdered on 12 June 1942 in Mauthausen concentration camp. The latter version is more likely. His wife and his daughter were both murdered in Auschwitz.
	HERE LIVED; LIDIE FEDEREROVÁ; BORN 1901; DEPORTED 1943; TO THERESIENSTADT; MURDERED 1943; IN AUSCHWITZ	Staroměstské nám 96; 50°24′37″N 14°54′06″E	Lidie Federerová née Abilovitz, also Lea, Leka or Leha, was born in 1901 in Sapotskin, today in Belarus. Her parents were Khava and Mordekhai Abilovitz. She had one brother, Josef or Yosef. She was married to Emil Federer and was a housewife. The couple had a daughter, Vera or Dvora (born in 1921). Both her husband and her daughter were murdered in the course of the Shoah: Emil Federer most probably in 1942 in Mauthausen, Věra Federerová in 1943 or later in Auschwitz. According to genie.com, Lidie Federerová lost her life in 1944 in Auschwitz.
	HERE LIVED; VĚRA FEDEREROVÁ; BORN 1921; DEPORTED 1943; TO THERESIENSTADT; MURDERED 1943; IN AUSCHWITZ	Staroměstské nám 96; 50°24′37″N 14°54′06″E	Věra Federerová, also Dvora, was born on 4 May 1921. Most probably her parents were Emil Federer, a merchant, and Lidie, Lea or Leha. Her last residence before deportation was in Líny close to Mladá Boleslav. On 16 January 1943, she was deported to Theresienstadt concentration camp and four days later, on 20 January 1943 further on to Auschwitz concentration camp. Her number on transport Cm was 264 of 491 and on transport Cq 158 of 2,000. She lost her life in Auschwitz. Also both of her parents were murdered by the Nazi regime.
	HERE LIVED; JOSEF HÖNIGSFELD; BORN 1903; DEPORTED 1943; TO MAUTHAUSEN; MURDERED 1942; IBIDEM	Staroměstské nám. 93/22; 50°24′38″N 14°54′06″E	Josef Hönigsfeld was born on 18 February 1903 in Slatiňany as the son of Alois Hönigsfeld and Arnoštka née Veselá (also Ernestine, 13 March 1880 - 2 June 1914). He had two sisters, Anna (born on 6 July 1909) and Emilie. He worked as a merchant and was married to Marie née Östereicherová. The couple had two sons, Zdenek (also Benjamin, born 1934) and Pavel (also Barùch, born 1937). While his family had to wait for their deportation, Josef Hönigsfeld was arrested already in 1942 and deported to Mauthausen-Gusen concentration camp, where he was murdered by the Nazi regime. His family was whipped out. His wife and their sons, age 9 and 6, were murdered in Auschwitz in 1943. His sister Anna, her husband Rudolf Freund and their daughters Ilona (born 1931) and Nora (born 1934) were all murdered in Auschwitz in 1944. The fate of his father and his other sister is unknown, but they too did not survive the Nazi reign in Bohemia.
	HERE LIVED; PAVEL HÖNIGSFELD; BORN 1937; DEPORTED 1943; TO THERESIENSTADT; MURDERED 1943; IN AUSCHWITZ	Staroměstské nám. 93/22; 50°24′38″N 14°54′06″E	Pavel Hönigsfeld, also Barùch, was born on 10 December 1937 in Mladá Boleslav. His parents were Josef Hönigsfeld and Marie née Östereicherová. He had an older brother, Zdenek (born 1934). The father, a merchant, was arrested in 1942, deported to Mauthausen and murdered there. Pavel Hönigsfeld, his mother and his brother stayed in Mladá Boleslav. On 16 January 1943, they were arrested and deported to Theresienstadt concentration camp by transport Cm. His transport number was 274 of 491. After eleven months, on 15 December 1943, the 6 years old boy was deported to Auschwitz concentration camp by transport Dr. His transport number was 893 of 2,519. There, the mother and her two sons were murdered in a gas chamber.
	HERE LIVED; ZDENĚK HÖNIGSFELD; BORN 1934; DEPORTED 1943; TO THERESIENSTADT; MURDERED 1943; IN AUSCHWITZ	Staroměstské nám. 93/22; 50°24′38″N 14°54′06″E	Zdenek Hönigsfeld, also Sidonius and Benjamin, was born on 22 October 1934 in Mladá Boleslav. His parents were Josef Hönigsfeld and Marie née Östereicherová. He had a younger brother, Pavel (born 1937). The father, a merchant, was arrested in 1942, deported to Mauthausen and murdered there. Zdenek Hönigsfeld, his mother and his brother stayed in Mladá Boleslav. On 16 January 1943, they were arrested and deported to Theresienstadt concentration camp by transport Cm. His transport number was 273 of 491. After eleven months, on 15 December 1943, the 9 years old boy was deported to Auschwitz concentration camp by transport Dr. His transport number was 894 of 2,519. There, the mother and her two sons were murdered in a gas chamber.
	HERE LIVED; MARIE; HÖNIGSFELDOVÁ; BORN 1910; DEPORTED 1943; TO THERESIENSTADT; MURDERED 1943; IN AUSCHWITZ	Staroměstské nám. 93/22; 50°24′38″N 14°54′06″E	Marie Hönigsfeldová née Östereicherová was born on 2 June 1910 in Pardubice. Her parents were Ignatz Östereicher and Julie née Fleischerová. She was married to Josef Hönigsfeld. The couple had two sons, Zdenek (born 1934) and Pavel (born 1937). Her husband, a merchant, was arrested in 1942, deported to Mauthausen and murdered there. Marie Hönigsfeldová and her sons stayed in Mladá Boleslav. On 16 January 1943, they were arrested and deported to Theresienstadt concentration camp by transport Cm. Her transport number was 272 of 491. After eleven months, on 15 December 1943, they was deported to Auschwitz concentration camp by transport Dr. Her transport number was 892 of 2,519. There, the mother and her two little sons were murdered in a gas chamber.
	HERE LIVED; VILÉM PICK; BORN 1881; DEPORTED 1943; TO THERESIENSTADT; MURDERED 1943; IN AUSCHWITZ	Debř, Josefodolská 58; 50°26′40″N 14°53′24″E	Vilém Pick was born on 1 July 1881. He was married to Růžena Picková. The couple had at least one son, Arnošt (born on 13 February 1911). Their son went to Prague, studied there, achieved a doctorate and married Marta née Radnitzerová (born on 16 February 1915). Both son and daughter-in-law were arrested and deported to Łódź Ghetto on 26 October 1941 by transport C. Their transport numbers were 435 and 436 of 1,000. Both were murdered by the Nazi regime. The last residence of Vilém Pick and his wife before deportation was in Debř. On 16 January 1943, the couple were arrested and deported from Mladá Boleslav to Theresienstadt concentration camp by transport Cm. His transport numbers was 397 of 491. Already four days later, on 20 January 1943, husband and wife were deported to Auschwitz concentration camp by transport Cq. His transport numbers was 496 of 2,000. There Vilém Pick and his wife lost their lives.
	HERE LIVED; RŮŽENA PICKOVÁ; BORN 1882; DEPORTED 1943; TO THERESIENSTADT; MURDERED 1943; IN AUSCHWITZ	Debř, Josefodolská 58; 50°26′40″N 14°53′24″E	Růžena Picková was born on 26 July 1882. She was married to Vilém Pick. The couple had at least one son, Arnošt (born on 13 February 1911). Their son went to Prague, studied there, achieved a doctorate and married Marta née Radnitzerová (born on 16 February 1915). Both son and daughter-in-law were deported to Łódź Ghetto on 26 October 1941. Both were murdered by the Nazi regime. The last residence of Růžena Picková and her husband before deportation was in Debř. On 16 January 1943, the couple were arrested and deported from Mladá Boleslav to Theresienstadt concentration camp by transport Cm. Her transport numbers was 398 of 491. Already four days later, on 20 January 1943, husband and wife were deported to Auschwitz concentration camp by transport Cq. Her transport numbers was 497 of 2,000. There Růžena Picková and her husband lost their lives.
	HERE LIVED; JOSEF SCHREIBEROVÁ; BORN 1888; DEPORTED 1943; TO THERESIENSTADT; MURDERED 1943; IN AUSCHWITZ	Staroměstské nám. 14/33; 50°24′37″N 14°54′08″E	Josef Schreiber was born on 27 August 1888. He was married to Rudolfina, born on 17 November 1890. The couple hat at least two children, Pavel (born on 6 February 1920) and Zdenka (born on 9 May 1922 in Mladá Boleslav). Their last residence before deportation was in Mladá Boleslav. Pavel was a student, Zdenka still went to school. On 16 January 1943, the whole family were arrested and deported to Theresienstadt concentration camp by transport Cm. Their transport numbers were 313 to 316 of 491. Already four days later, on 20 January 1943, parents and children were deported to Auschwitz concentration camp by transport Cq. Their transport numbers were 1448 to 1451 of 2,000. There Josef Schreiber, his wife and his children were murdered by the Nazi regime. Also Adolfina Schreiberová, most probably his sister, was deported with the same trains to Theresienstadt and Auschwitz. She too became a victim of the Shoah.
	HERE LIVED; ADOLFINA; SCHREIBEROVÁ; BORN 1903; DEPORTED 1943; TO THERESIENSTADT; MURDERED 1943; IN AUSCHWITZ	Staroměstské nám. 14/33; 50°24′37″N 14°54′08″E	Adolfina Schreiberová was born on 27 February 1903. Her last residence before deportation was in Mladá Boleslav. On 16 January 1943, she was arrested and deported to Theresienstadt concentration camp by transport Cm. Her transport numbers was 293 of 491. Already four days later, on 20 January 1943, she was deported to Auschwitz concentration camp by transport Cq. Their transport numbers was 1191 of 2,000. There Adolfina Schreiberová was murdered by the Nazi regime. Also Josef Schreiber, most probably her brother, his wife and his children were killed at Auschwitz.

== Dates of collocations ==
The Stolpersteine in Mladá Boleslav were collocated by the artist himself on 13 September 2014.

The Czech Stolperstein project was initiated in 2008 by the Česká unie židovské mládeže (Czech Union of Jewish Youth) and was realized with the patronage of the Mayor of Prague.

== See also ==
- List of places with Stolpersteine
