= Hlinsko =

- Town
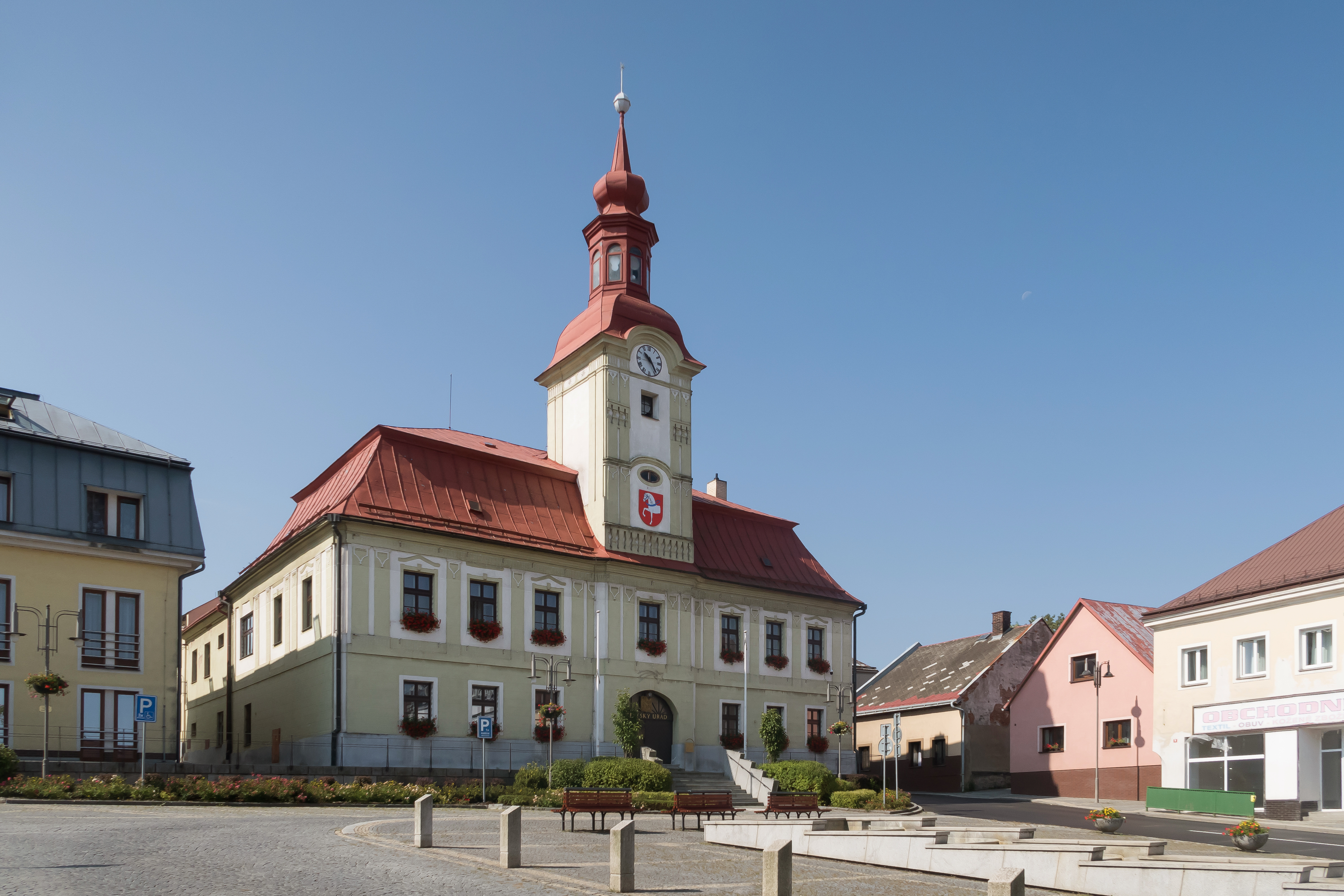
- Town hall

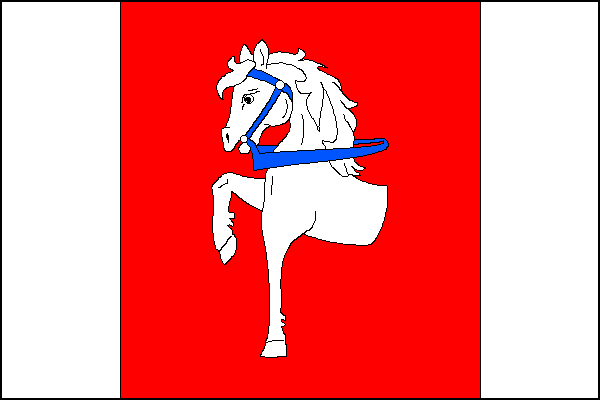
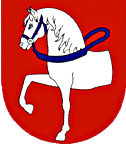
- Flag Coat of arms

- Location in the Czech Republic
- Coordinates: 49°45′44″N 15°54′27″E
- Country: Czech Republic
- Region: Pardubice
- District: Chrudim
- First mentioned: 1349

Government
  - Mayor: Miroslav Krčil

Area
  - Total: 24.27 km^{2} (9.37 sq mi)
- Elevation: 582 m (1,909 ft)

Population (2026-01-01)
  - Total: 9,504
  - Density: 391.6/km^{2} (1,014/sq mi)
- Time zone: UTC+1 (CET)
  - Summer (DST): UTC+2 (CEST)
- Postal code: 539 01
- Website: www.hlinsko.cz

Hlinsko (Czech pronunciation: [ˈɦlɪnsko]) is a town in Chrudim District in the Pardubice Region of the Czech Republic. It has about 9,500 inhabitants. The town is located on the Chrudimka River in the Iron Mountains.

Hlinsko was founded in the 12th century and became a town in 1834. The locality of Betlém is well preserved example of folk architecture and is protected as a village monument reservation.

== Administrative division ==
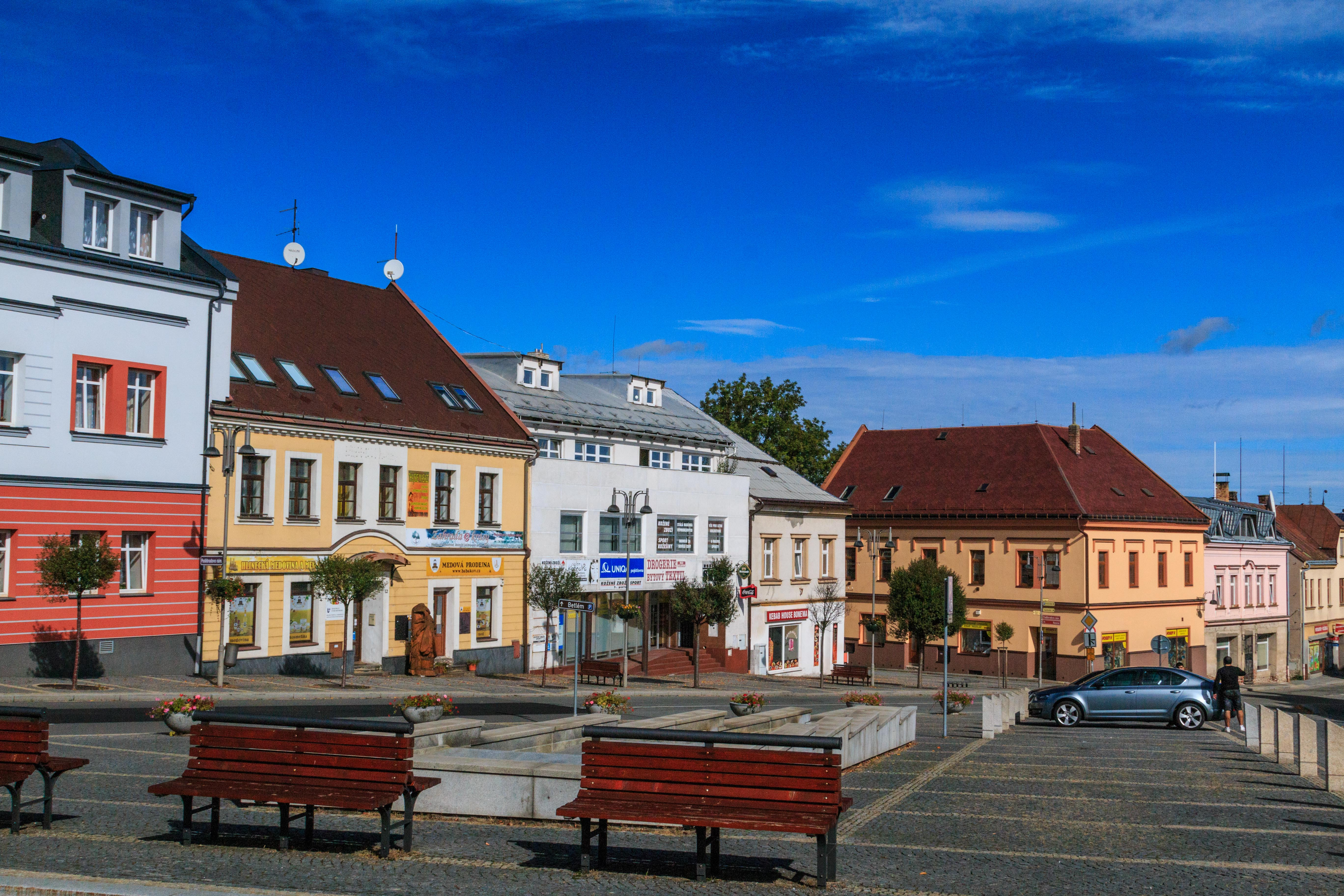
The square Poděbradovo náměstí

Hlinsko consists of six municipal parts (in brackets population according to the 2021 census):

- Hlinsko (7,806)
- Blatno (569)
- Čertovina (107)
- Chlum (261)
- Kouty (262)
- Srní (266)

Chlum forms an exclave of the municipal territory.

== Etymology ==
The name is derived from the Czech word hlína, i.e. 'clay'. The name arose thanks to the deposits of high-quality potter's clay.

== Geography ==
Hlinsko is located about 21 kilometres (13 mi) south of Chrudim and 30 km (19 mi) south of Pardubice. It lies in the Iron Mountains. The highest point is at 678 m (2,224 ft) above sea level. The town is situated on both banks of the Chrudimka River. The territory of Hlinsko is partly located within the Železné hory Protected Landscape Area.

== History ==
The area around the Chrudimka River is inhabited since the 12th century. Hlinsko was founded in the 12th century as a guarding settlement on the trade route from Bohemia to Moravia. The first written mention of Hlinsko is from 1349. The fortress in Hlinsko is first documented in 1413. In the 16th century, it served as a royal customhouse.

During the reign of Maria Theresa, Hlinsko became a market town, and in 1834, it became a town. During its history, the town's economy consisted mainly of agriculture, pottery, wire-making and weaving. The tradition of pottery craft originated in the 15th century and ended in the 19th century. In 1871, the railway was built and the town was industrialised.

Hlinsko was an important centre of household-appliance manufacturing. The Eta company was founded in the town in 1943 and later became part of Elektro-Praga. Before 1990, the company employed about 3,000 people in Hlinsko. Appliance production in the town ended in 2011.

== Demographics ==
Historical population

Year	Pop.	±%
1869	4,882	—
1880	4,964	+1.7%
1890	5,231	+5.4%
1900	5,962	+14.0%
1910	7,085	+18.8%

Year	Pop.	±%
1921	6,901	−2.6%
1930	8,084	+17.1%
1950	7,413	−8.3%
1961	8,346	+12.6%
1970	9,357	+12.1%

Year	Pop.	±%
1980	10,182	+8.8%
1991	10,916	+7.2%
2001	10,543	−3.4%
2011	9,903	−6.1%
2021	9,271	−6.4%

Source: Censuses

== Economy ==
Mlékárna Hlinsko is a major dairy company located in the town. The company was founded in 1939. The production started in 1943.

== Transport ==
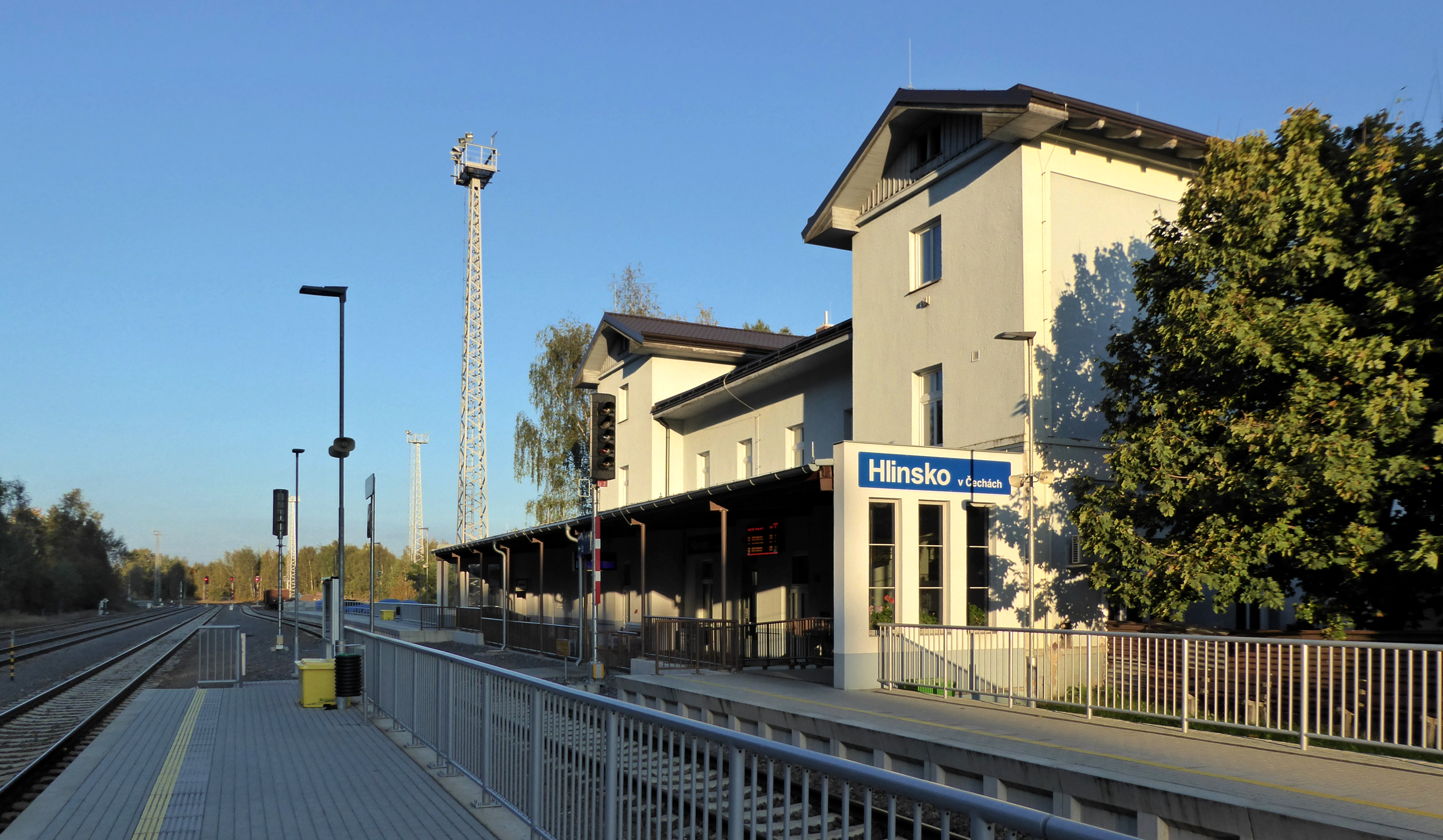
Train station

Hlinsko is the terminus and starting point of two railway lines, heading from/to Pardubice and Havlíčkův Brod.

== Culture ==
Hlinsko and several municipalities in the surrounding area are known for Slavic carnival processions of masks. In 2010, this tradition known as "Shrovetide door-to-door processions and masks in the villages of the Hlinecko area" was included on the UNESCO Intangible Cultural Heritage Lists.

== Sights ==
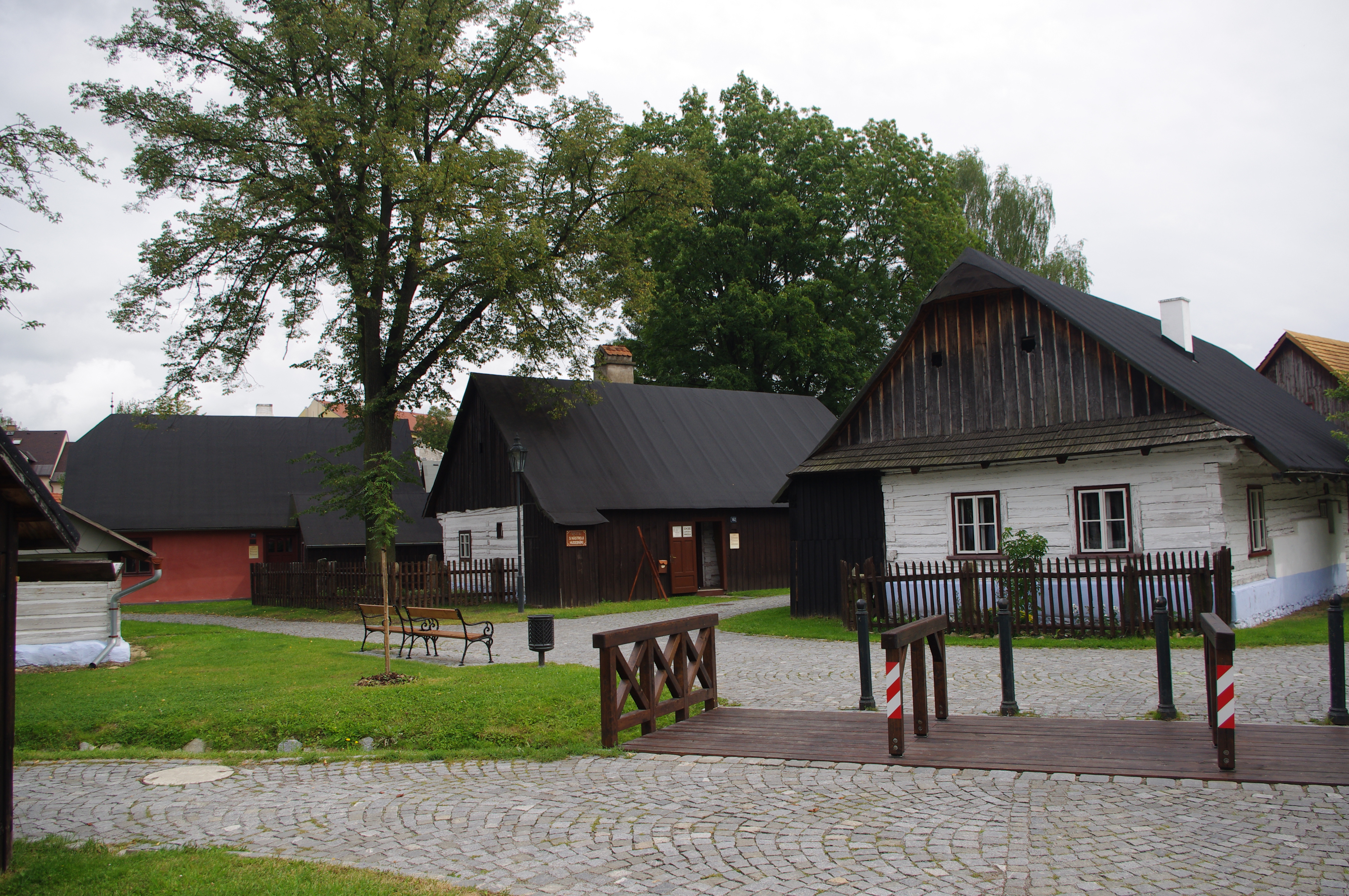
Betlém Village Monument Reservation

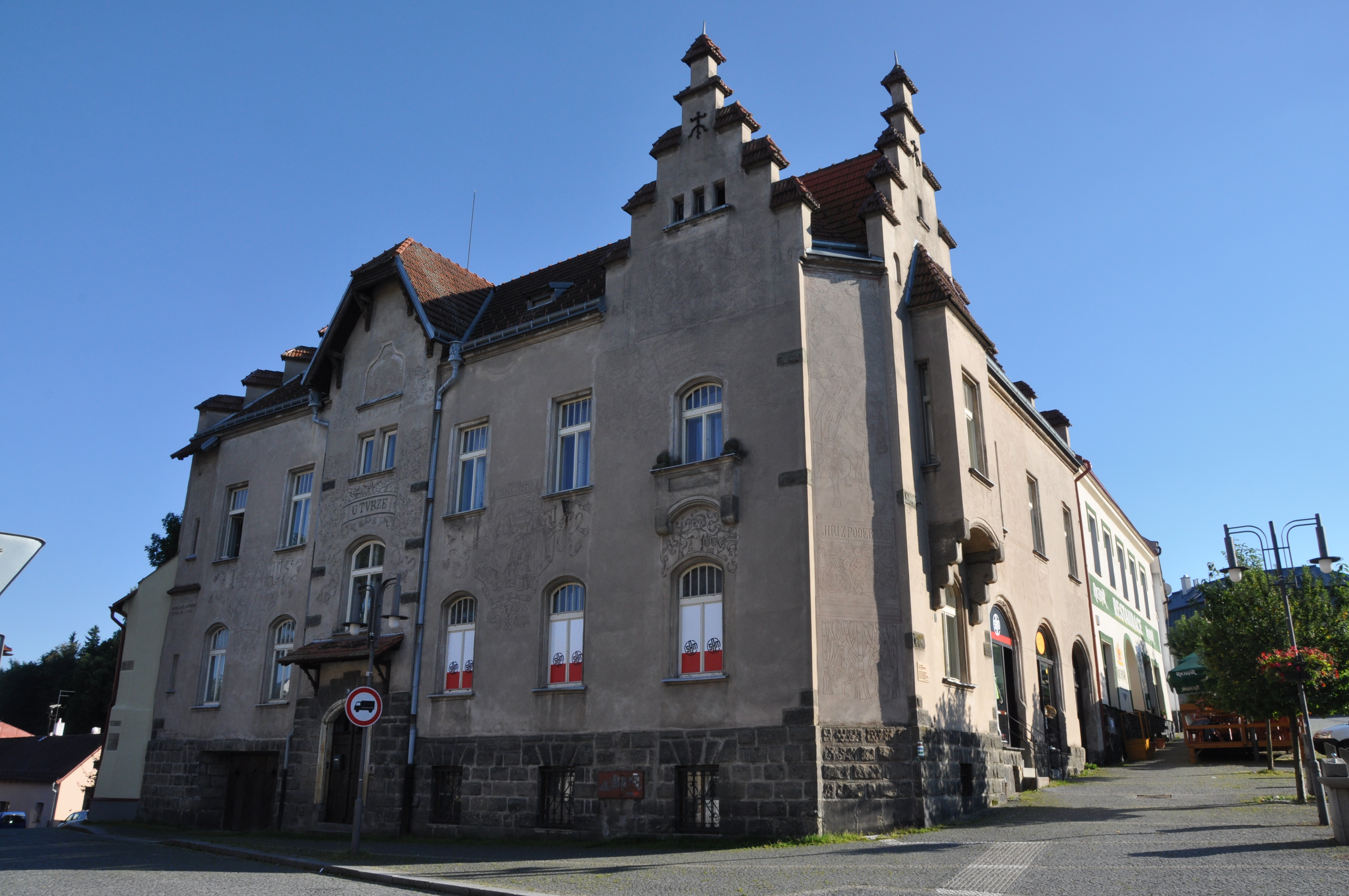
Ježdík's House

Hlinsko is known for the Betlém Village Monument Reservation with preserved examples of folk architecture. This area around the Chrudimka River consists of valuable timbered and brick houses from the 18th and early 19th centuries. It is part of the Vysočina Open Air Museum.

The historic centre is formed by the square Poděbradovo náměstí. The most valuable building on the square are the town hall, Ježdík's House and the old fortress. The town hall was built in 1598 and rebuilt in the Baroque style in 1788–1792. The last reconstructions were made in 1850. Since its foundation, it serves its original purpose. Ježdík's House is a significant house with sgraffito decorations from 1904. The old fortress, called simply Tvrz ('fortress'), is the oldest building in Hlinsko.

The Church of the Nativity of the Virgin Mary is located outside the historic centre. The originally Gothic church was rebuilt in the Baroque style in 1730–1745, but the Gothic tower was partly preserved. It has a valuable baptistry from 1628.

== Notable people ==
- Emanuel Famíra (1900–1970), sculptor
- Karel Lidický (1900–1976), sculptor
- Jan Vokál (born 1958), bishop
- Jan Chvojka (born 1980), politician

== Twin towns – sister cities ==
Hlinsko is twinned with:

- Púchov, Slovakia
- Stara Pazova, Serbia
