= Vítanov =

- Municipality
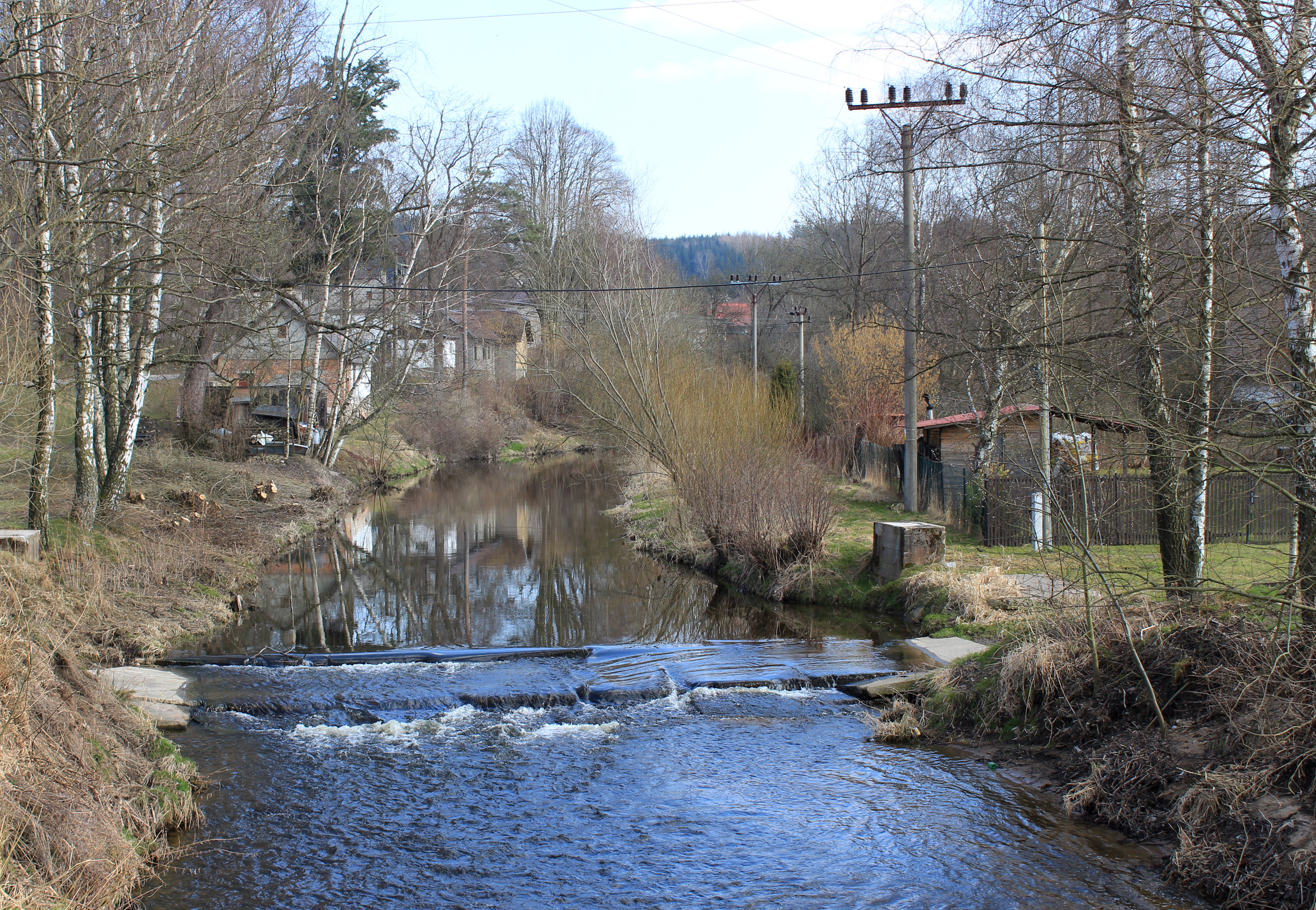
- The Chrudimka River in Vítanov

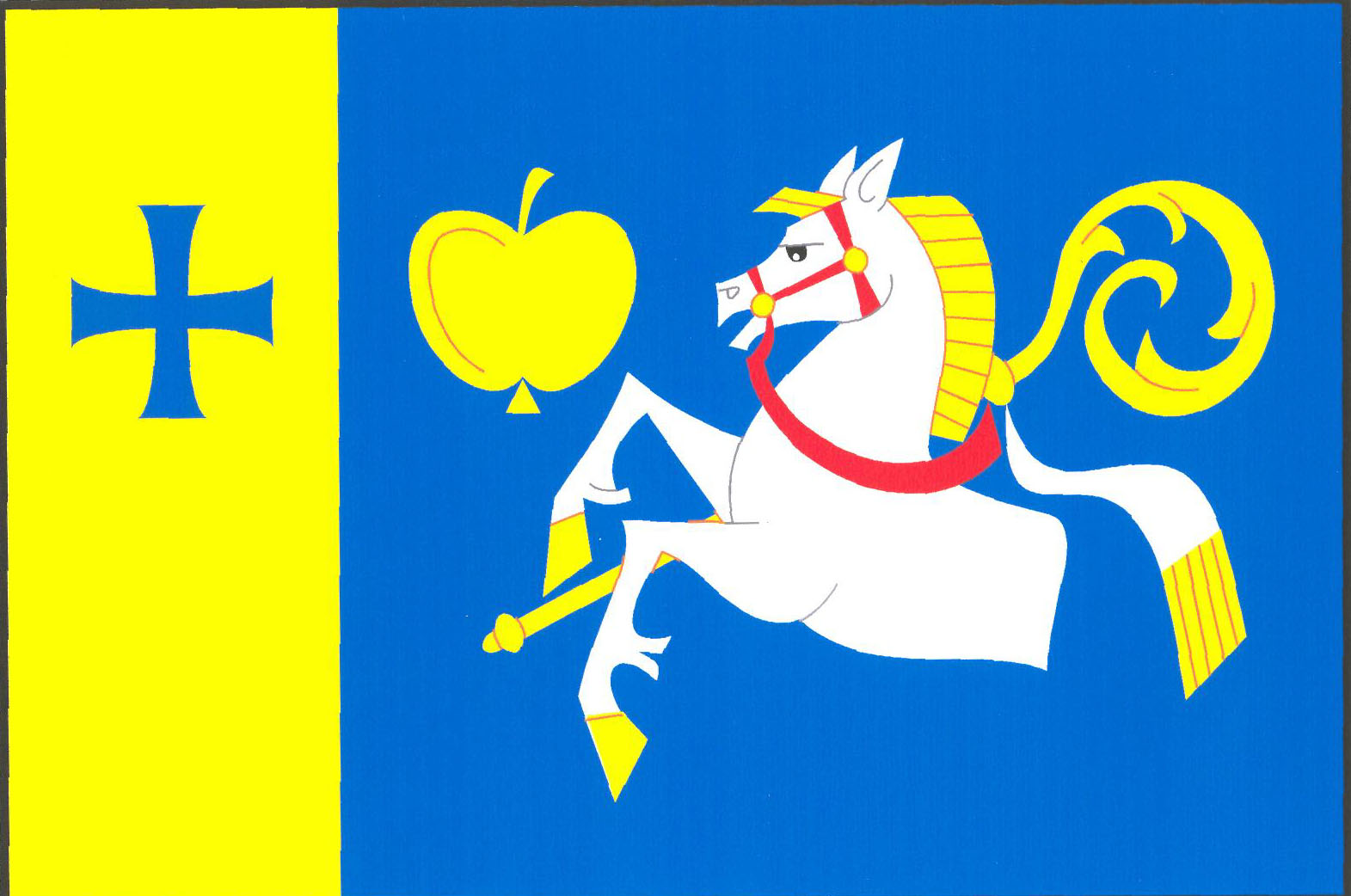
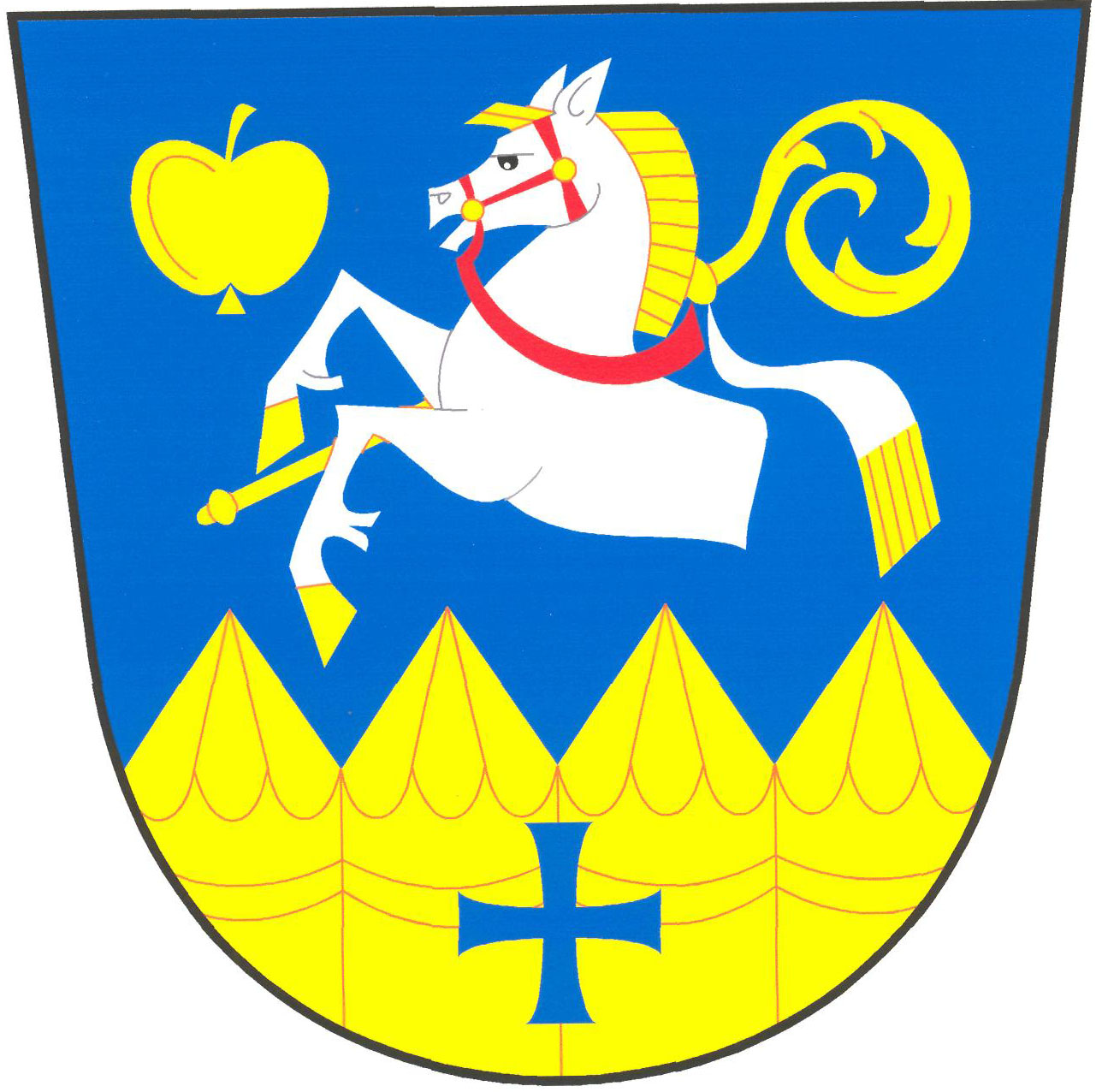
- Flag Coat of arms

- Location in the Czech Republic
- Coordinates: 49°44′57″N 15°52′54″E
- Country: Czech Republic
- Region: Pardubice
- District: Chrudim
- First mentioned: 1353

Area
  - Total: 6.52 km^{2} (2.52 sq mi)
- Elevation: 548 m (1,798 ft)

Population (2026-01-01)
  - Total: 481
  - Density: 73.8/km^{2} (191/sq mi)
- Time zone: UTC+1 (CET)
  - Summer (DST): UTC+2 (CEST)
- Postal code: 539 01
- Website: www.vitanov.cz

Vítanov is a municipality and village in Chrudim District in the Pardubice Region of the Czech Republic. It has about 500 inhabitants.

== Administrative division ==
Vítanov consists of two municipal parts (in brackets population according to the 2021 census):

- Vítanov (355)
- Stan (94)

== Demographics ==
Historical population
Year	Pop.	±%
1869	715	—
1880	679	−5.0%
1890	711	+4.7%
1900	781	+9.8%
1910	819	+4.9%
1921	733	−10.5%
1930	718	−2.0%
1950	620	−13.6%
1961	559	−9.8%
1970	501	−10.4%
1980	499	−0.4%
1991	423	−15.2%
2001	427	+0.9%
2011	408	−4.4%
2021	449	+10.0%
Source: Censuses
