= Karel Lidický =

Czech sculptor

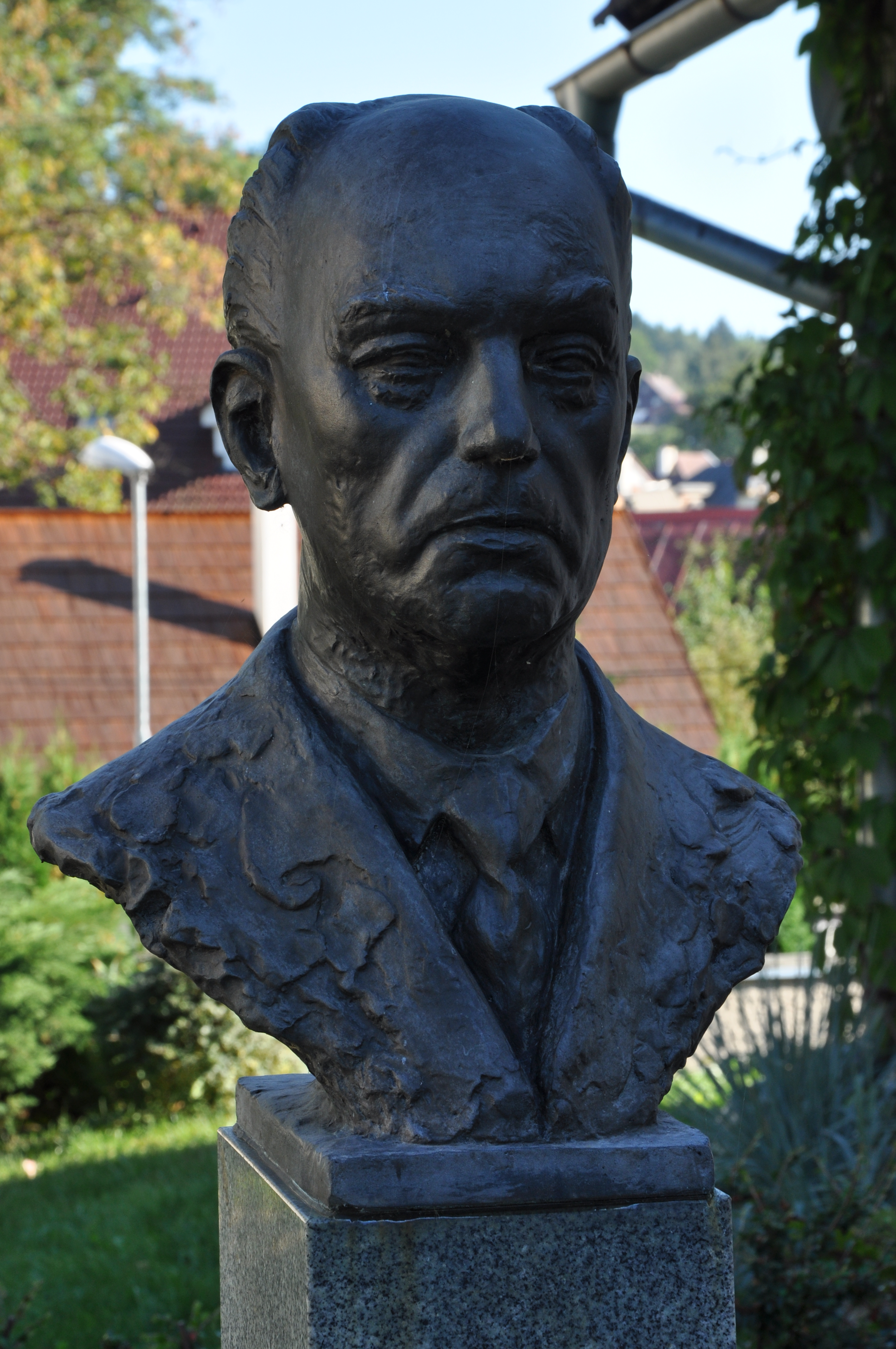
- Born: 17 June 1900; Hlinsko, Bohemia, Austria-Hungary
- Died: 21 May 1976 (aged 75); Prague, Czechoslovakia
- Occupation: Sculptor

Karel Lidický (17 June 1900 – 21 May 1976) was a Czech sculptor. His work was part of the sculpture event in the art competition at the 1932 Summer Olympics.
