= Tuněchody =

- Municipality
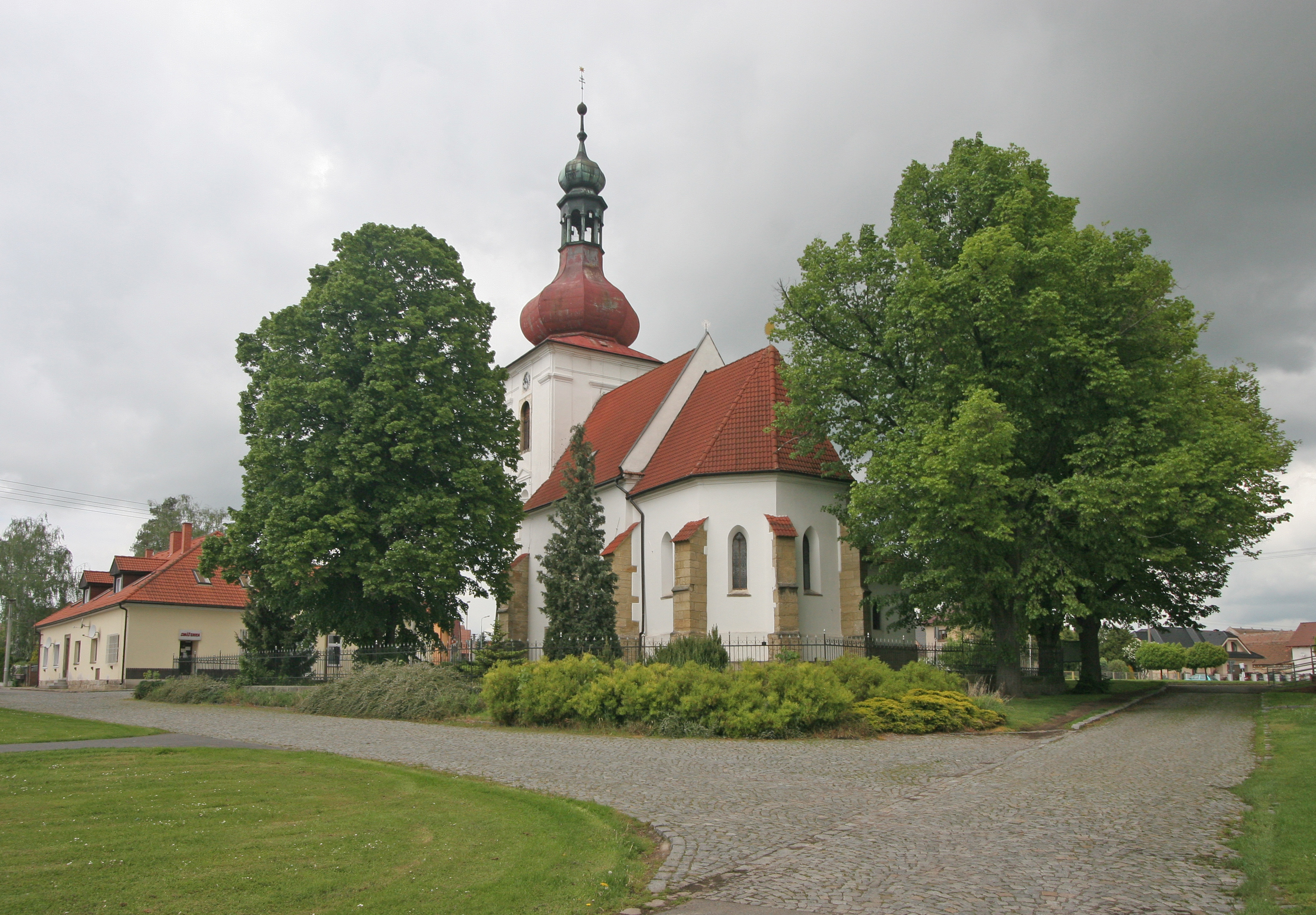
- Church of the Beheading of John the Baptist

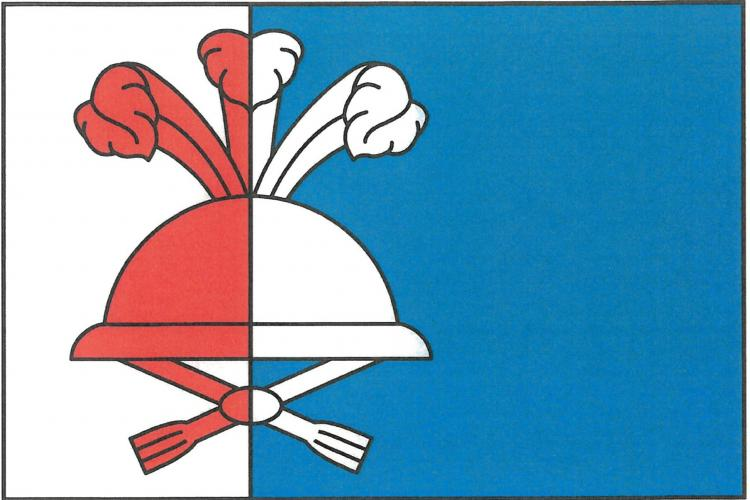
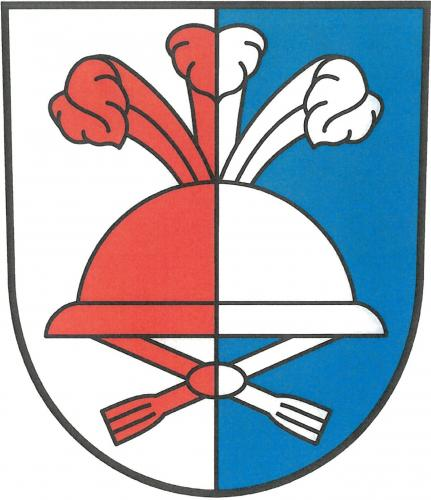
- Flag Coat of arms

- Location in the Czech Republic
- Coordinates: 49°58′44″N 15°50′29″E
- Country: Czech Republic
- Region: Pardubice
- District: Chrudim
- First mentioned: 1349

Area
  - Total: 6.58 km^{2} (2.54 sq mi)
- Elevation: 237 m (778 ft)

Population (2026-01-01)
  - Total: 599
  - Density: 91.0/km^{2} (236/sq mi)
- Time zone: UTC+1 (CET)
  - Summer (DST): UTC+2 (CEST)
- Postal code: 537 01
- Website: www.tunechody.cz

Tuněchody is a municipality and village in Chrudim District in the Pardubice Region of the Czech Republic. It has about 600 inhabitants.

== Demographics ==
Historical population
Year	Pop.	±%
1869	683	—
1880	747	+9.4%
1890	712	−4.7%
1900	830	+16.6%
1910	822	−1.0%
1921	781	−5.0%
1930	774	−0.9%
1950	724	−6.5%
1961	674	−6.9%
1970	661	−1.9%
1980	621	−6.1%
1991	591	−4.8%
2001	569	−3.7%
2011	592	+4.0%
2021	614	+3.7%
Source: Censuses
