= Svídnice (Chrudim District) =

- Municipality
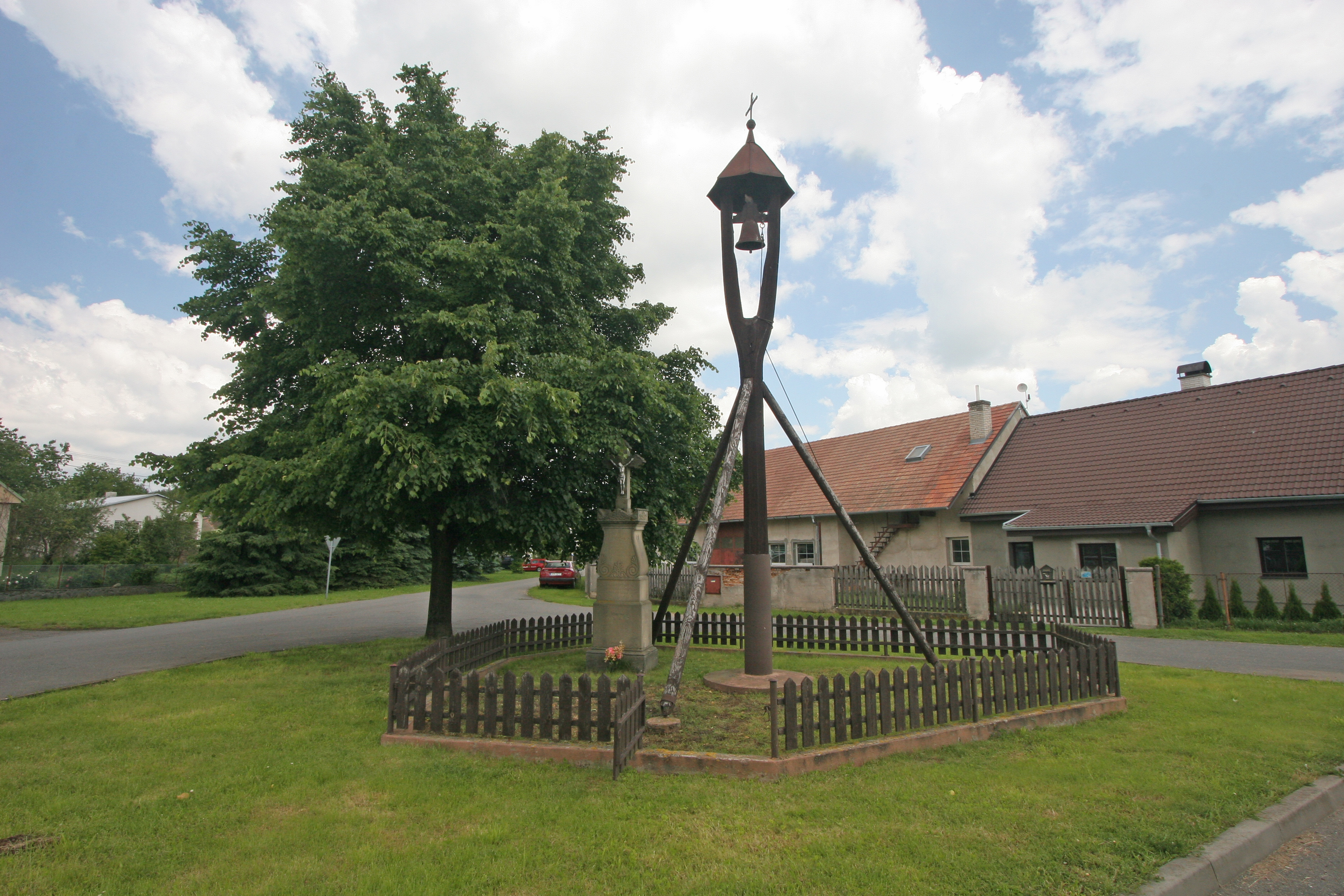
- Belfry in the centre of Svídnice

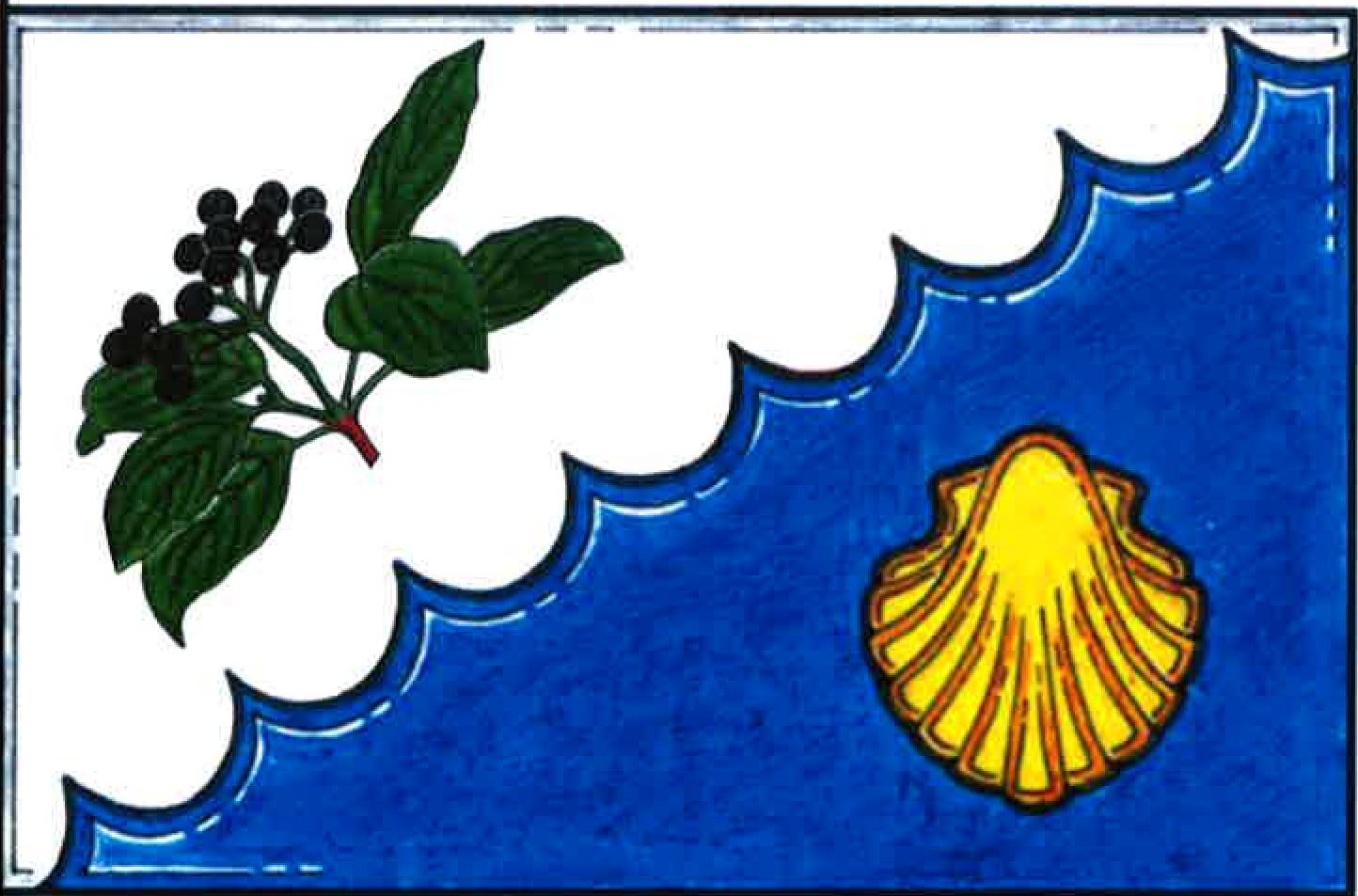
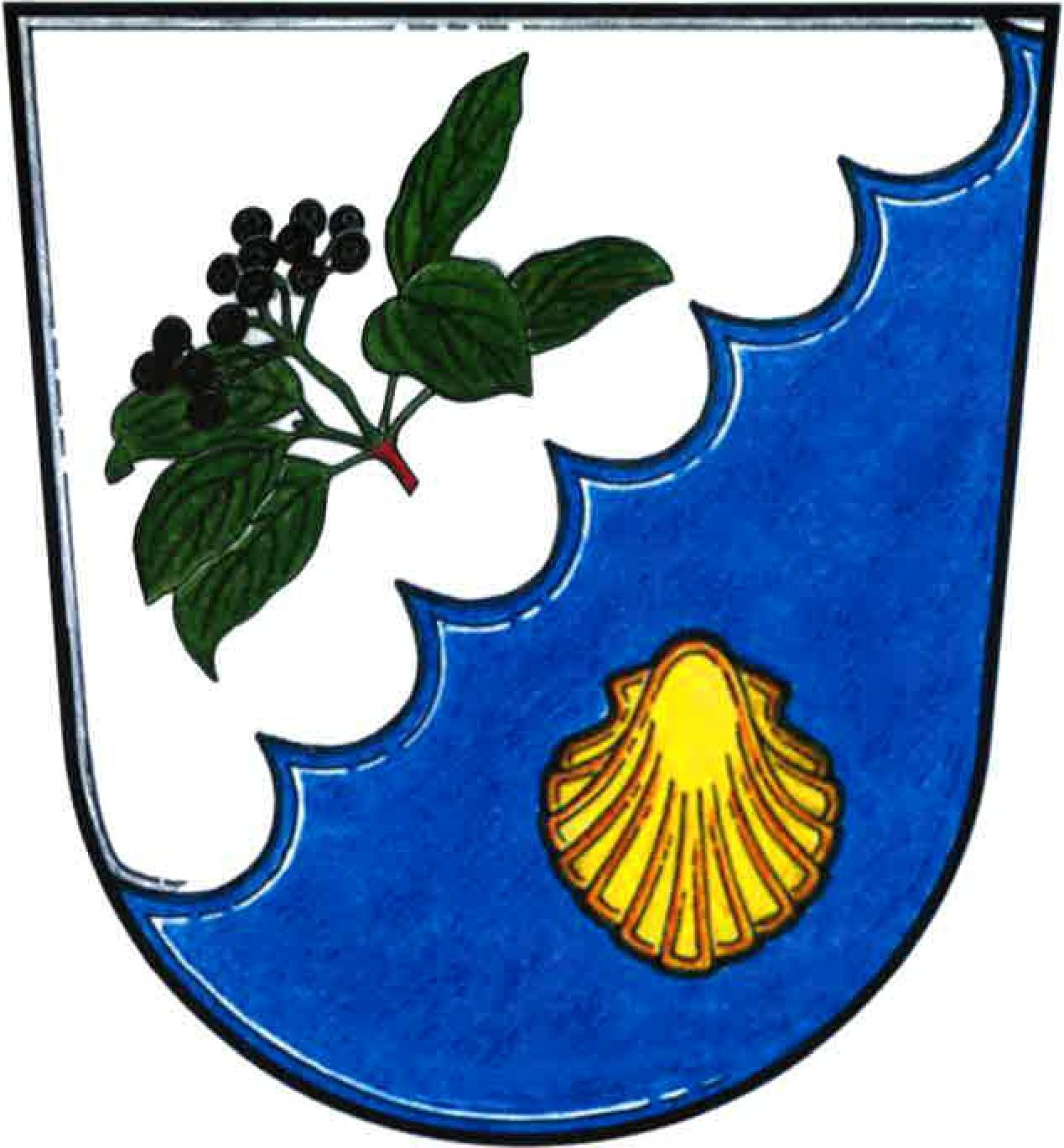
- Flag Coat of arms

- Location in the Czech Republic
- Coordinates: 49°53′24″N 15°48′50″E
- Country: Czech Republic
- Region: Pardubice
- District: Chrudim
- First mentioned: 1349

Area
  - Total: 3.12 km^{2} (1.20 sq mi)
- Elevation: 294 m (965 ft)

Population (2026-01-01)
  - Total: 413
  - Density: 132/km^{2} (343/sq mi)
- Time zone: UTC+1 (CET)
  - Summer (DST): UTC+2 (CEST)
- Postal codes: 538 21, 538 24
- Website: www.obecsvidnice.cz

Svídnice is a municipality and village in Chrudim District in the Pardubice Region of the Czech Republic. It has about 400 inhabitants.

== Administrative division ==
Svídnice consists of two municipal parts (in brackets population according to the 2021 census):

- Svídnice (373)
- Práčov (48)

== Demographics ==
Historical population
Year	Pop.	±%
1869	460	—
1880	485	+5.4%
1890	485	+0.0%
1900	487	+0.4%
1910	468	−3.9%
1921	472	+0.9%
1930	453	−4.0%
1950	405	−10.6%
1961	494	+22.0%
1970	448	−9.3%
1980	397	−11.4%
1991	383	−3.5%
2001	370	−3.4%
2011	407	+10.0%
2021	421	+3.4%
Source: Censuses
