= Slatiňany =

- Town
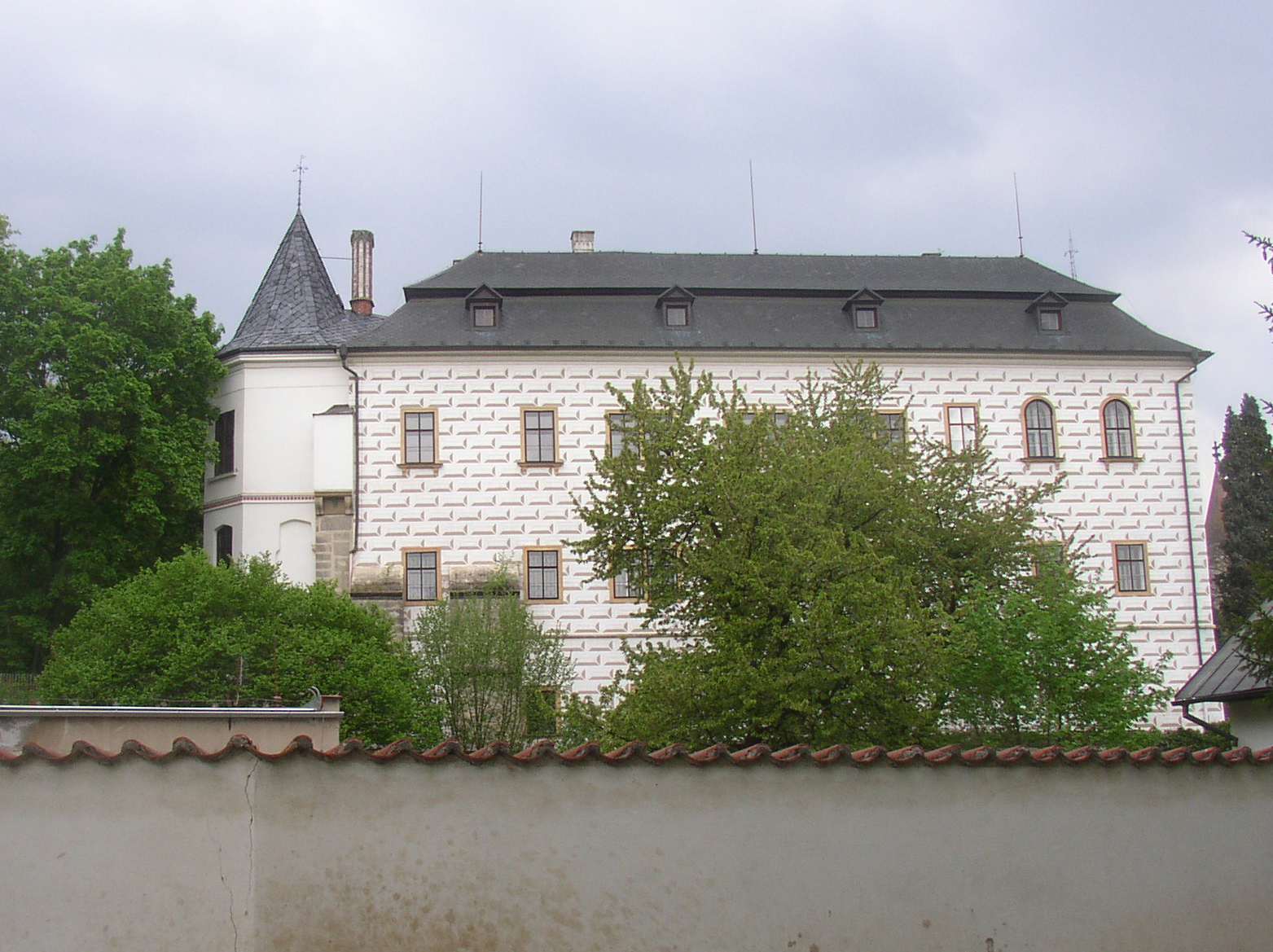
- Eastern wing of the Slatiňany Castle

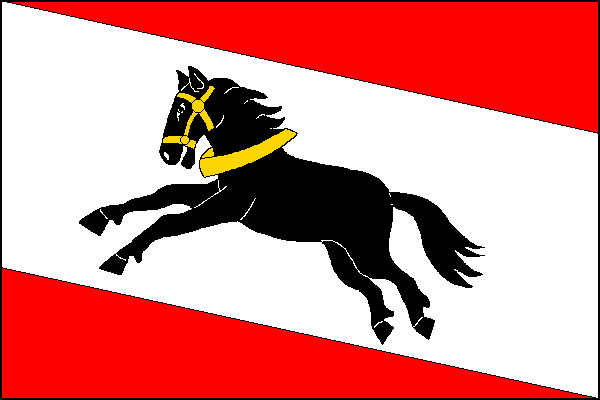
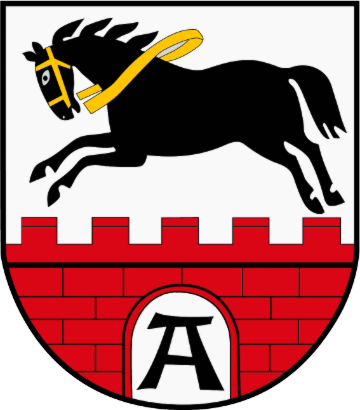
- Flag Coat of arms

- Location in the Czech Republic
- Coordinates: 49°55′16″N 15°48′50″E
- Country: Czech Republic
- Region: Pardubice
- District: Chrudim
- First mentioned: 1294

Government
  - Mayor: Jan Brůžek

Area
  - Total: 15.61 km^{2} (6.03 sq mi)
- Elevation: 268 m (879 ft)

Population (2026-01-01)
  - Total: 4,134
  - Density: 264.8/km^{2} (685.9/sq mi)
- Time zone: UTC+1 (CET)
  - Summer (DST): UTC+2 (CEST)
- Postal code: 538 21
- Website: www.slatinany.cz

Slatiňany (Czech pronunciation: [ˈslacɪɲanɪ]) is a town in Chrudim District in the Pardubice Region of the Czech Republic. It has about 4,100 inhabitants. The town proper is located on the Chrudimka River in the Svitavy Uplands.

Slatiňany was founded in the 13th century at the latest, but it became a town only in 1971. The most important monument is the Slatiňany Castle, protected as a national cultural monument.

== Administrative division ==
Slatiňany consists of five municipal parts (in brackets population according to the 2021 census):

- Slatiňany (3,037)
- Kochánovice (9)
- Kunčí (191)
- Škrovád (490)
- Trpišov (242)

== Etymology ==
The name is derived from the Czech words slatina ('marsh') and slatiňan (a person living near a marsh).

== Geography ==
Slatiňany is located about 3 kilometres (2 mi) south of Chrudim and 12 km (7 mi) south of Pardubice. The eastern part of the municipal territory with the town proper lies in the Svitavy Uplands and the western part lies in the Iron Mountains. The highest point is the hill Hůra at 392 m (1,286 ft) above sea level. The Chrudimka River flows through the town.

== History ==
The first written mention of Slatiňany is from 1294. A wooden Gothic fortress on a promontory above the Chrudimka was documented in 1371. In the 19th century, during the rule of the noble Auersperg family, the village of Slatiňany economically developed. In the late 19th and early 20th centuries, it became an industrial centre with sugar factory, distillery and fertiliser factory. In 1971, Slatiňany was promoted to a town.

== Demographics ==
Historical population

Year	Pop.	±%
1869	1,966	—
1880	2,303	+17.1%
1890	2,476	+7.5%
1900	2,665	+7.6%
1910	2,864	+7.5%

Year	Pop.	±%
1921	2,844	−0.7%
1930	3,175	+11.6%
1950	3,355	+5.7%
1961	3,635	+8.3%
1970	3,850	+5.9%

Year	Pop.	±%
1980	3,929	+2.1%
1991	4,049	+3.1%
2001	3,973	−1.9%
2011	4,141	+4.2%
2021	3,969	−4.2%

Source: Censuses

== Transport ==
The I/37 road, which connects Hradec Králové and Pardubice with the D1 motorway, passes next to the town.

Slatiňany is located on the railway lines Pardubice–Havlíčkův Brod and Pardubice–Skuteč.

== Sights ==
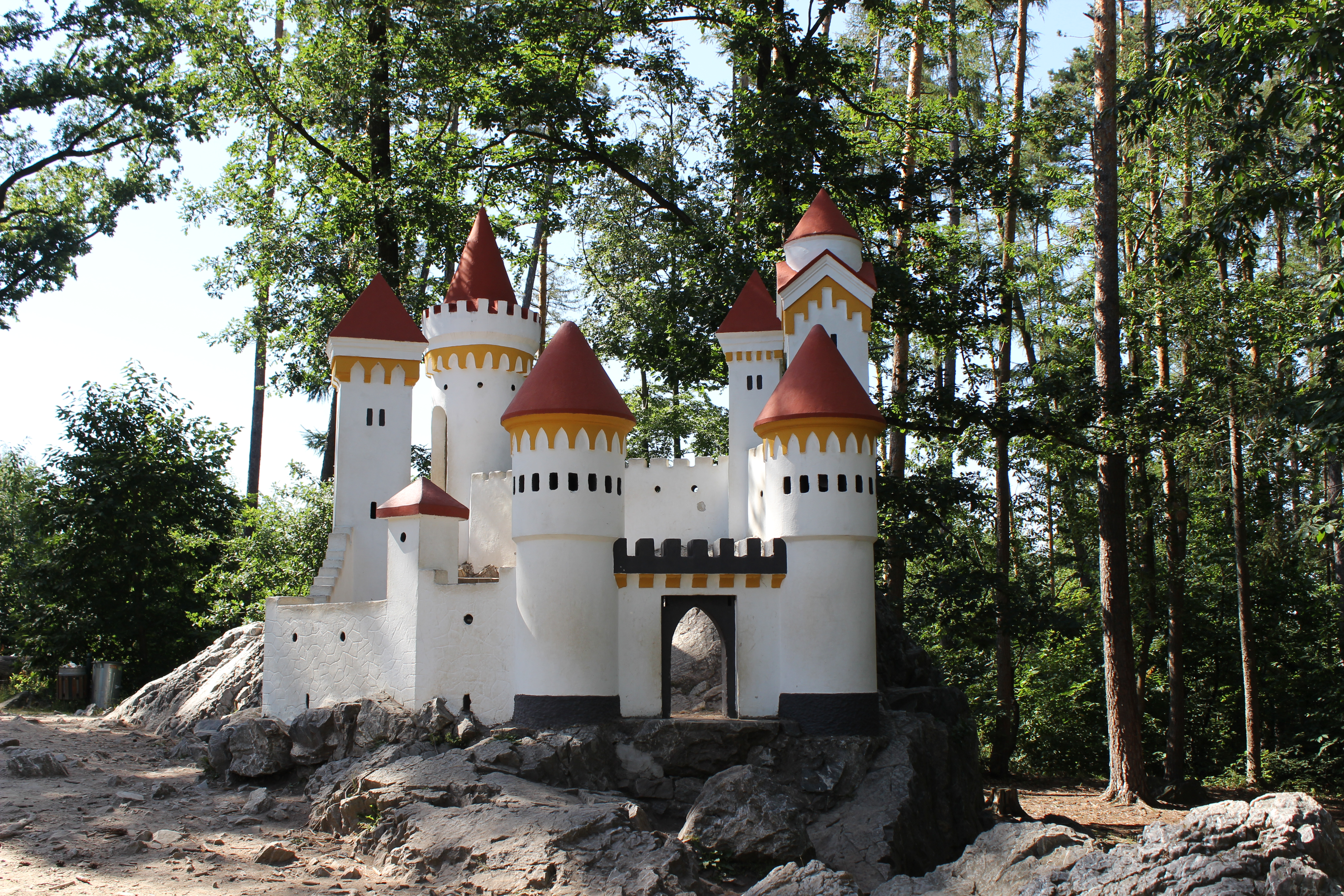
Kočičí hrádek

The main landmark is the Slatiňany Castle with a 16 ha (40-acre) large English park. It was originally a neo-Gothic fortress, rebuilt into a Renaissance castle. During the rule of the Auersperg family after 1746, the castle became the administrative centre of the estate and was converted into a comfortable summer residence with a park. The castle and park create a very valuable set of monuments, protected as a national cultural monument. Among the most notable elements are the Baroque and Romantic interiors and the castle stud farm, built in 1894–1898. This former stud farm now houses the museum of Kladruber.

The park is also decorated with Kočičí hrádek, which is 1:5 scale miniature of a castle.

== Notable people ==
- Helena Vondráčková (born 1947), singer; raised here

== Twin towns – sister cities ==
Slatiňany is twinned with:

- Freienstein-Teufen, Switzerland
- Likavka, Slovakia
- Rorbas, Switzerland
