= Horní Bradlo =

- Municipality
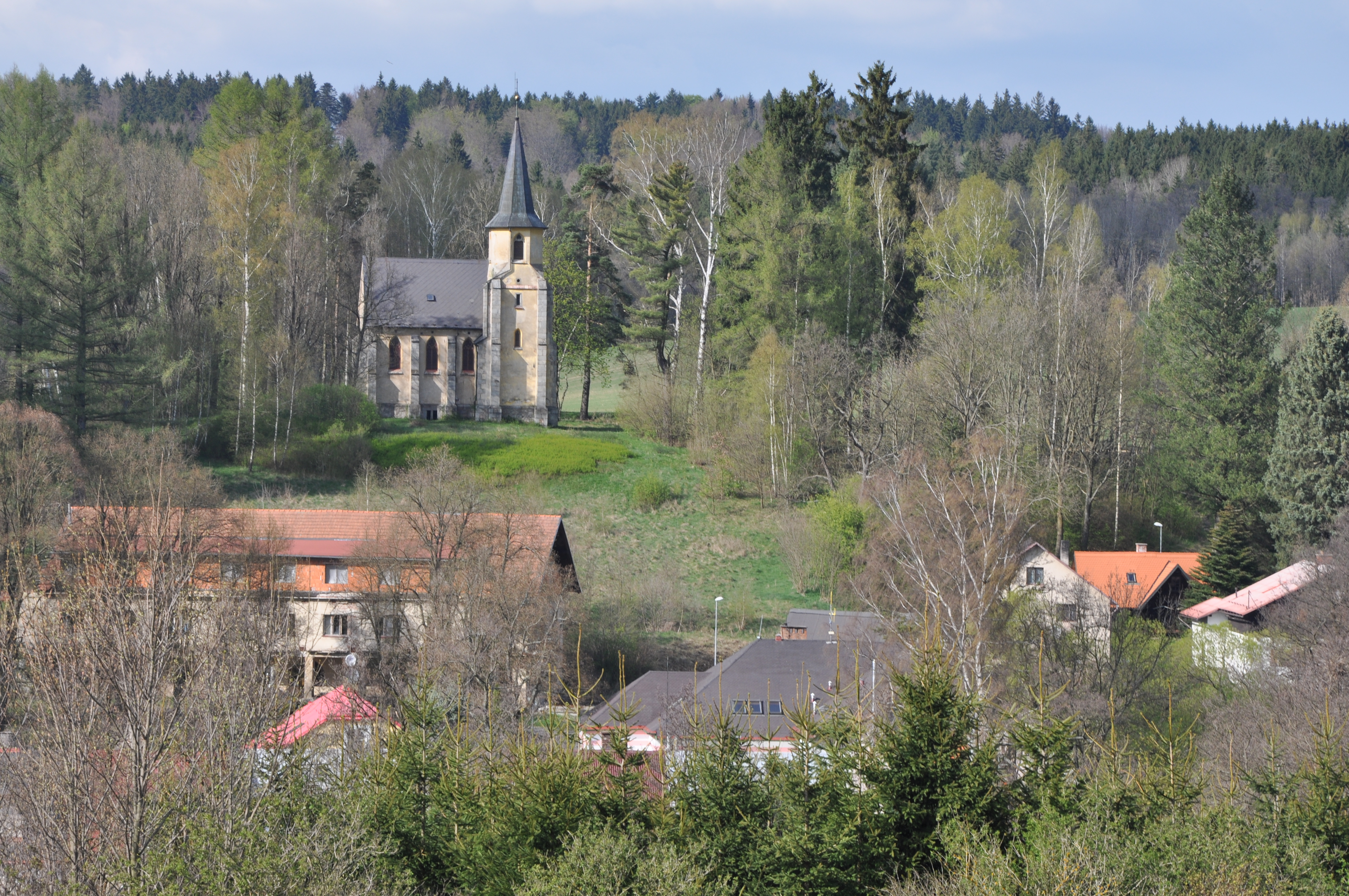
- Chapel of the Virgin Mary

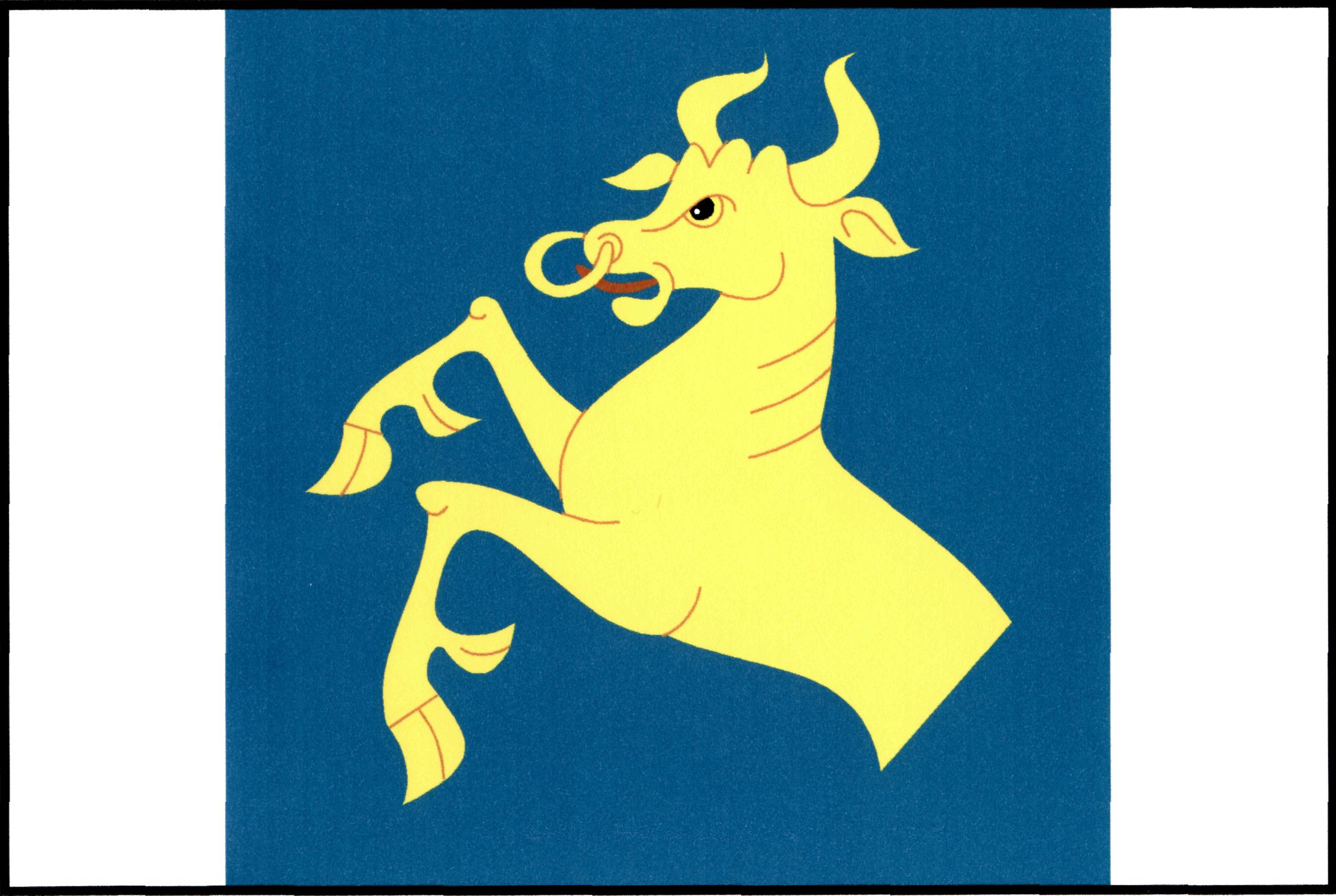
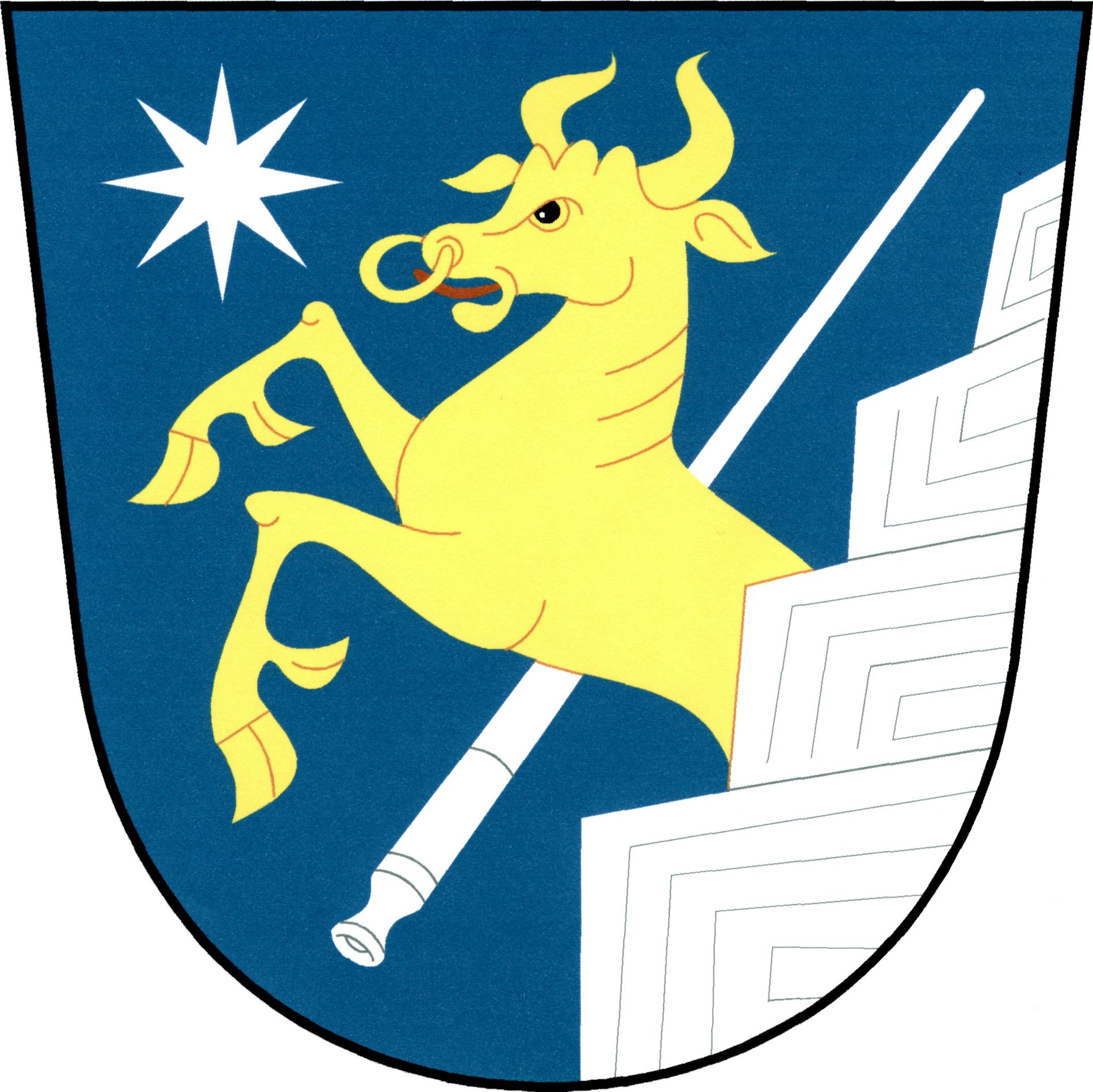
- Flag Coat of arms

- Location in the Czech Republic
- Coordinates: 49°48′9″N 15°44′40″E
- Country: Czech Republic
- Region: Pardubice
- District: Chrudim
- First mentioned: 1329

Area
  - Total: 20.33 km^{2} (7.85 sq mi)
- Elevation: 510 m (1,670 ft)

Population (2026-01-01)
  - Total: 420
  - Density: 21/km^{2} (54/sq mi)
- Time zone: UTC+1 (CET)
  - Summer (DST): UTC+2 (CEST)
- Postal codes: 538 25, 539 53
- Website: www.hornibradlo.cz

Horní Bradlo is a municipality and village in Chrudim District in the Pardubice Region of the Czech Republic. It has about 400 inhabitants.

== Administrative division ==
Horní Bradlo consists of seven municipal parts (in brackets population according to the 2021 census):

- Horní Bradlo (107)
- Dolní Bradlo (125)
- Javorné (16)
- Lipka (28)
- Travná (57)
- Velká Střítež (40)
- Vršov (57)

== Demographics ==
Historical population
| Year | Pop. | ±% |
|---|---|---|
| 1869 | 1,264 | — |
| 1880 | 1,320 | +4.4% |
| 1890 | 1,258 | −4.7% |
| 1900 | 1,210 | −3.8% |
| 1910 | 1,157 | −4.4% |
| 1921 | 1,171 | +1.2% |
| 1930 | 1,115 | −4.8% |
| 1950 | 848 | −23.9% |
| 1961 | 815 | −3.9% |
| 1970 | 725 | −11.0% |
| 1980 | 659 | −9.1% |
| 1991 | 573 | −13.1% |
| 2001 | 476 | −16.9% |
| 2011 | 448 | −5.9% |
| 2021 | 430 | −4.0% |
Source: Censuses
