= Úhřetická Lhota =

- Municipality
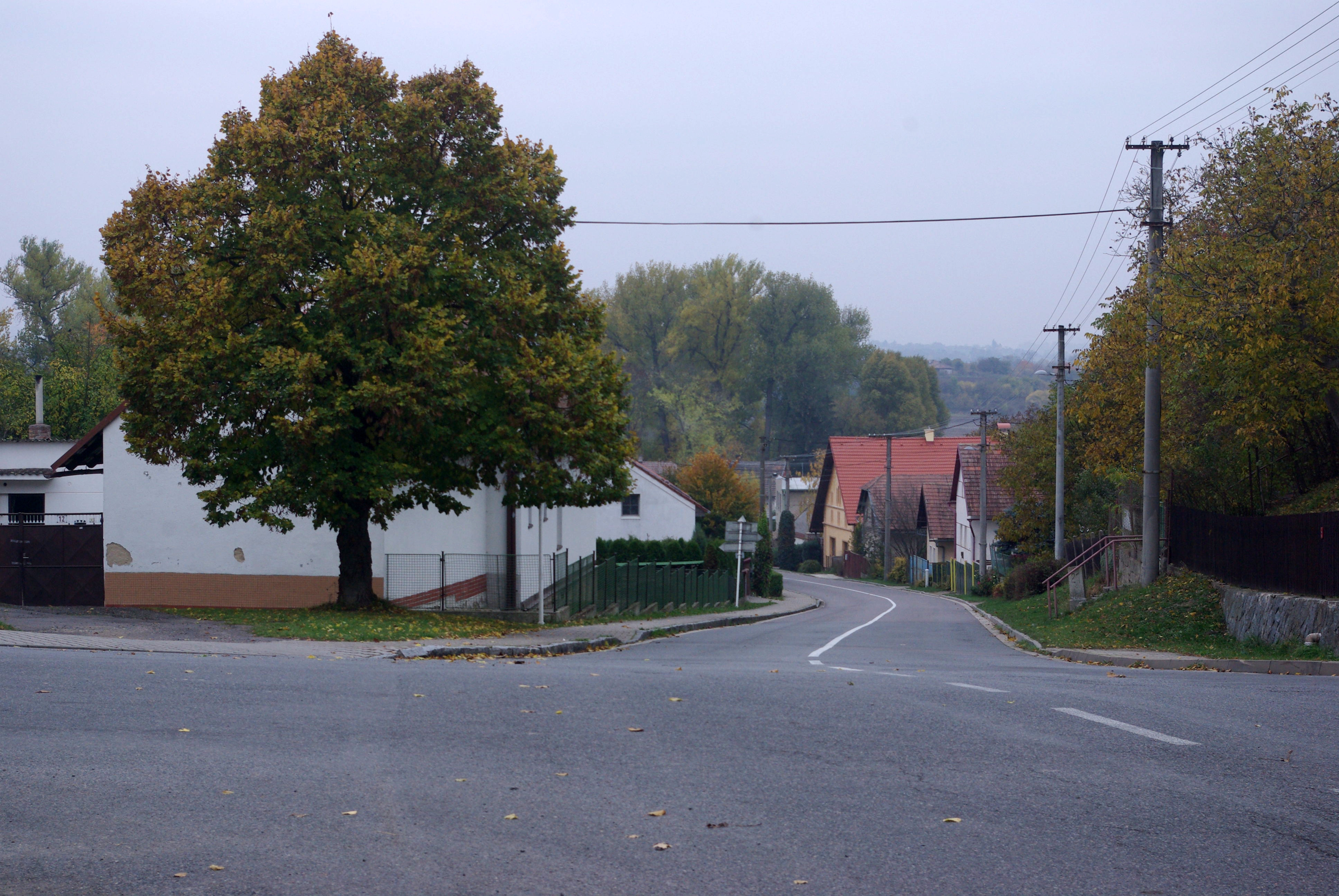
- Crossroads

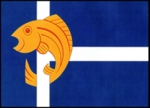
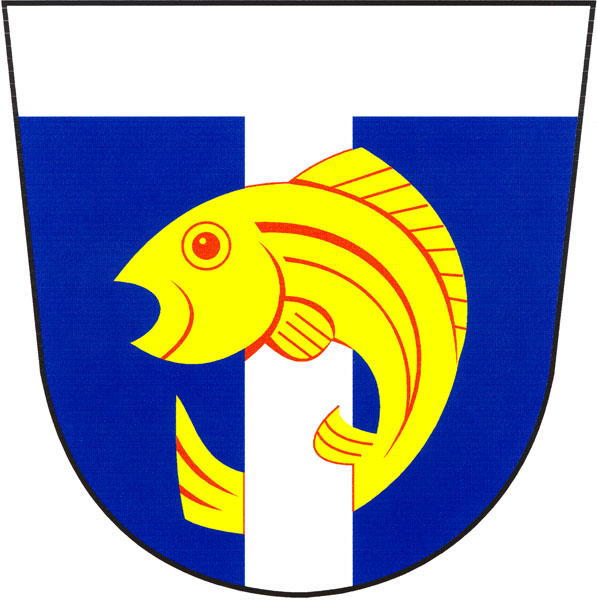
- Flag Coat of arms

- Location in the Czech Republic
- Coordinates: 49°59′19″N 15°52′22″E
- Country: Czech Republic
- Region: Pardubice
- District: Pardubice
- First mentioned: 1340

Area
  - Total: 3.21 km^{2} (1.24 sq mi)
- Elevation: 240 m (790 ft)

Population (2026-01-01)
  - Total: 334
  - Density: 104/km^{2} (269/sq mi)
- Time zone: UTC+1 (CET)
  - Summer (DST): UTC+2 (CEST)
- Postal code: 530 02
- Website: www.uhretickalhota.cz

Úhřetická Lhota is a municipality and village in Pardubice District in the Pardubice Region of the Czech Republic. It has about 300 inhabitants.

== Demographics ==
Historical population
Year	Pop.	±%
1869	366	—
1880	395	+7.9%
1890	374	−5.3%
1900	366	−2.1%
1910	323	−11.7%
1921	341	+5.6%
1930	352	+3.2%
1950	288	−18.2%
1961	275	−4.5%
1970	263	−4.4%
1980	238	−9.5%
1991	208	−12.6%
2001	221	+6.2%
2011	247	+11.8%
2021	298	+20.6%
Source: Censuses
