= Hamry (Chrudim District) =

- Municipality
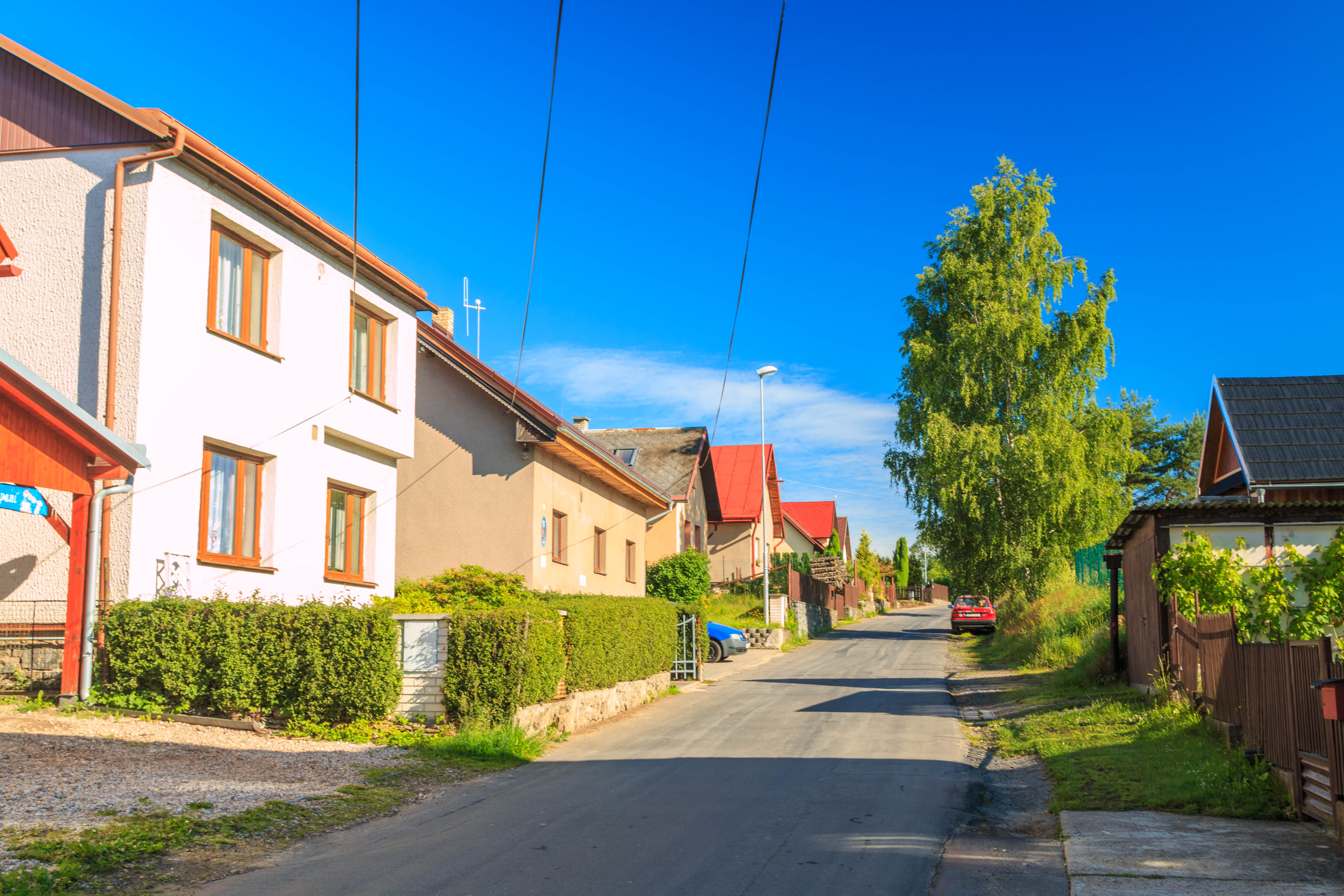
- Main street with the municipal office

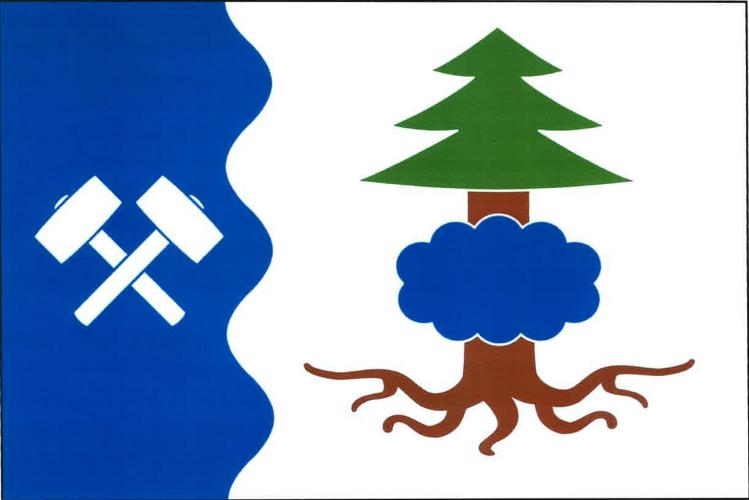
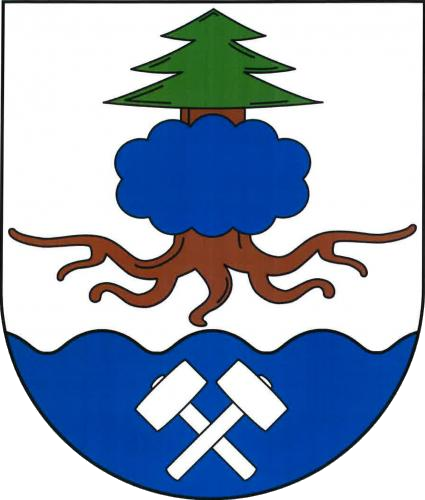
- Flag Coat of arms

- Location in the Czech Republic
- Coordinates: 49°44′20″N 15°55′35″E
- Country: Czech Republic
- Region: Pardubice
- District: Chrudim
- First mentioned: 1353

Area
  - Total: 3.82 km^{2} (1.47 sq mi)
- Elevation: 585 m (1,919 ft)

Population (2026-01-01)
  - Total: 235
  - Density: 61.5/km^{2} (159/sq mi)
- Time zone: UTC+1 (CET)
  - Summer (DST): UTC+2 (CEST)
- Postal code: 539 01
- Website: www.hamry.cz

Hamry is a municipality and village in Chrudim District in the Pardubice Region of the Czech Republic. It has about 200 inhabitants.

== Demographics ==
Historical population
Year	Pop.	±%
1869	531	—
1880	530	−0.2%
1890	536	+1.1%
1900	559	+4.3%
1910	607	+8.6%
1921	559	−7.9%
1930	597	+6.8%
1950	395	−33.8%
1961	368	−6.8%
1970	320	−13.0%
1980	262	−18.1%
1991	219	−16.4%
2001	237	+8.2%
2011	259	+9.3%
2021	221	−14.7%
Source: Censuses
