= Iron Mountains (Czech Republic) =

Mountain range in Czechia

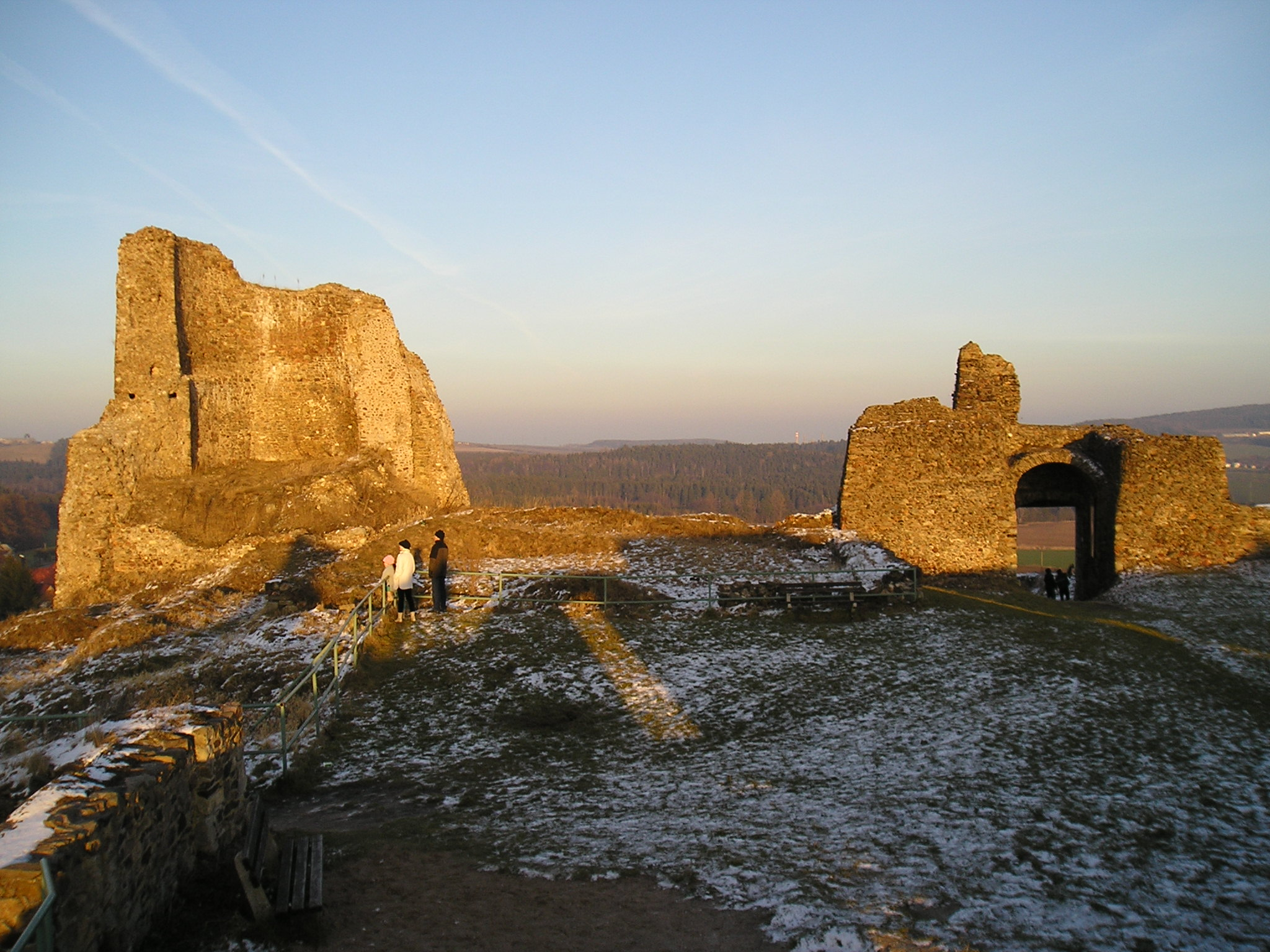

Highest point
- Peak: Pešava
- Elevation: 697 m (2,287 ft)

Dimensions
- Area: 580 km^{2} (220 mi^{2})

Geography
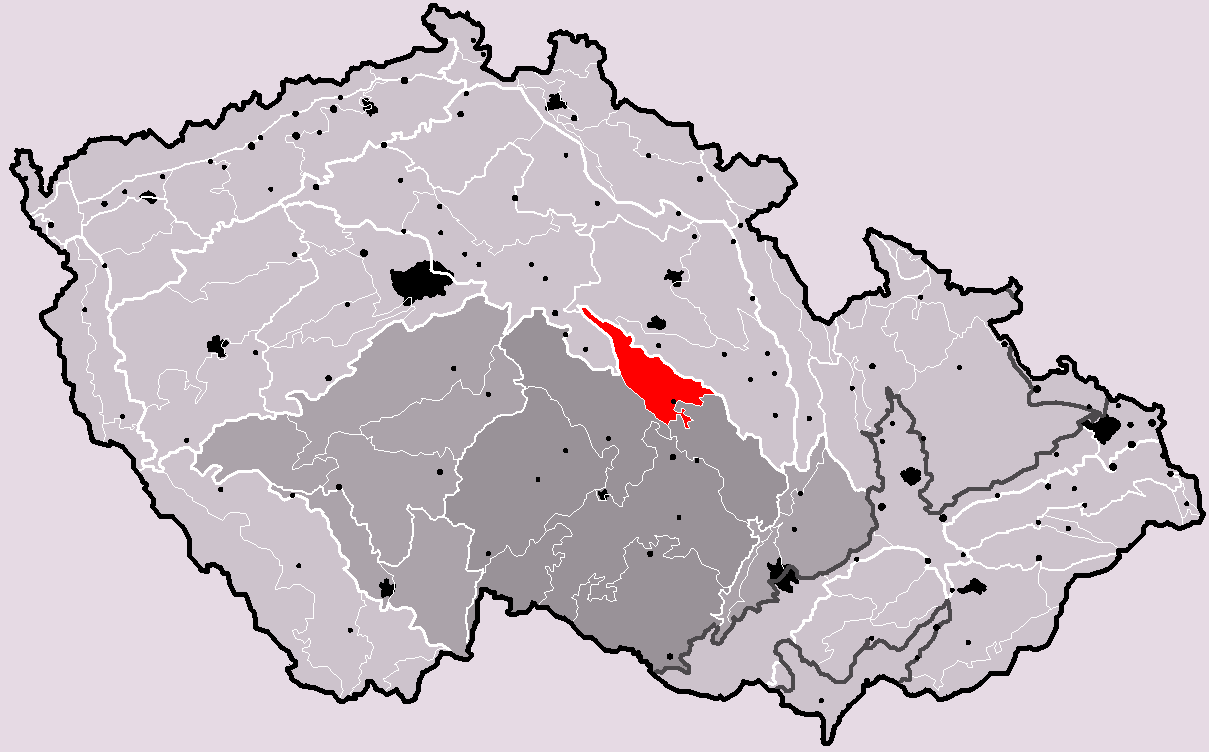
- Iron Mountains on the map of The Czech Republic
- Country: Czech Republic
- State: Pardubice Region
- Range coordinates: 50°30′N 16°00′E

The Iron Mountains (Czech: Železné hory) is a mountain range in the Czech Republic, which is a part of the Bohemian-Moravian Highlands. Their location is in the North of the Bohemian-Moravian Highlands. They have an area of 748 km², their average height is 480,8 metres, and their highest peak is Pešava at a height of 697 metres which is located exactly in the Sečská Upland, which is part of the Iron Mountains. But other sources state that the highest peak is Vestec, at a height of 668 metres.

== Etymology ==
The mountain's name originates from the past metal abundance of the region, as it was the site of many mines of iron.

== Geography ==
The mountain range can be characterised geographically, as an upland with a triangular shape, with a plateau from the southeast through to the northwest of the mountains.

Divisions

- Chvaletická Plateau
- Sečská Upland

Highest mountain peaks

- Pešava 697 metres
- Vestec 668 metres
- Spálava 663 metres
- U Chloumku 661 metres
- Srní 653 metres
- Zuberský vrch 650 metres
- Polom 649 metres

== Waters ==
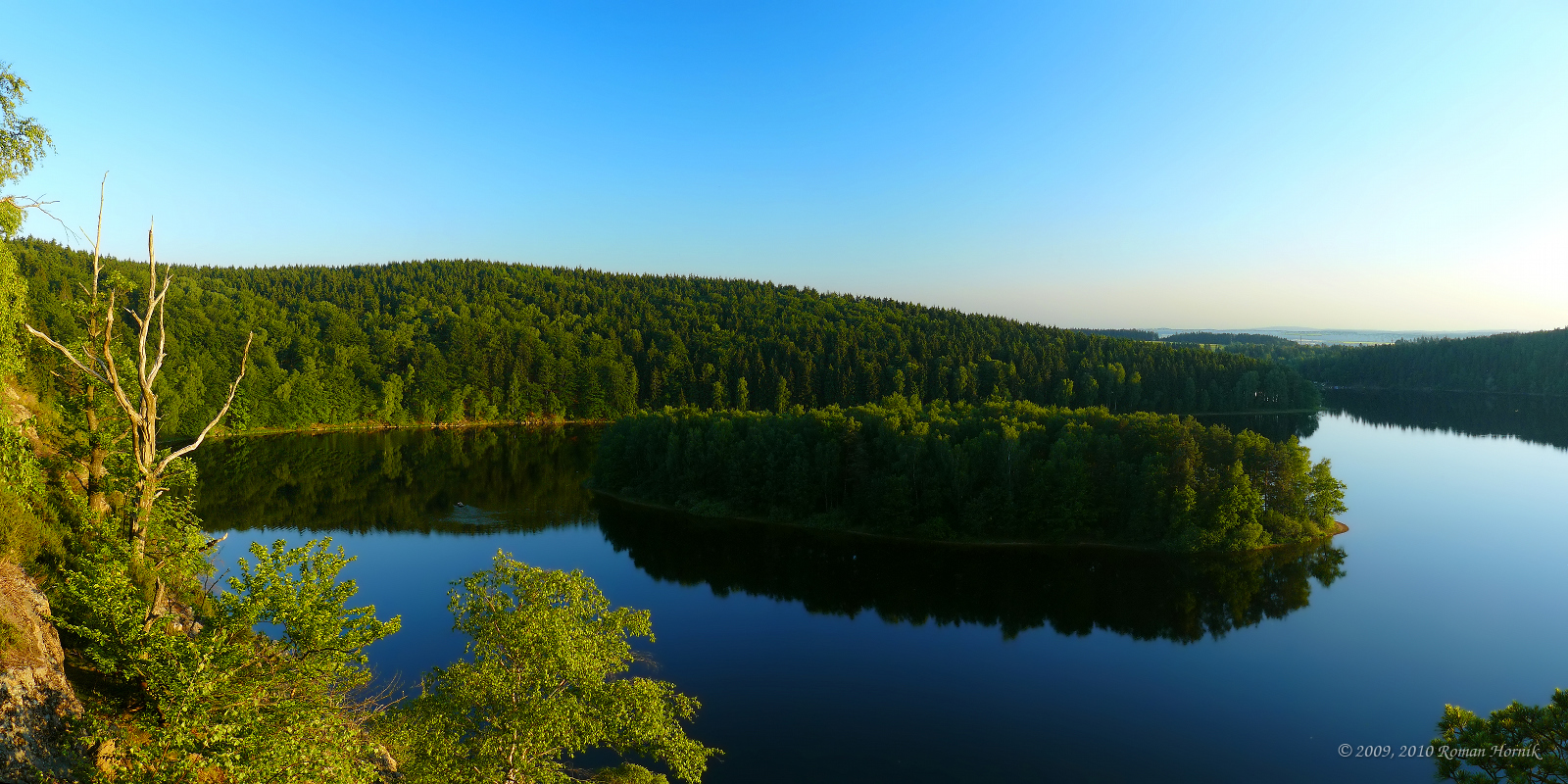
Seč Reservoir in the Iron Mountains

The Iron Mountains are located in the basin of the river Elbe. The longest rivers in the area are Chrudimka and Doubrava. On the first river the following artificial water reservoirs are located: Seč I (the largest reservoir), Seč II, Křižanovice I, and Křižanovice II. Next to the reservoirs are located several holiday spots.

== Settlements ==
In the mountains and around the area are located several villages, towns and cities: Heřmanův Městec, Třemošnice, Chrudim, Slatiňany and Hlinsko.
