= Chlum =

Chlum may refer to places in the Czech Republic:

- Chlum (Benešov District), a municipality and village in the Central Bohemian Region
- Chlum (Česká Lípa District), a municipality and in the Liberec Region
- Chlum (Plzeň-South District), a municipality and in the Plzeň Region
- Chlum (Rokycany District), a municipality and in the Plzeň Region
- Chlum (Strakonice District), a municipality and in the South Bohemian Region
- Chlum (Třebíč District), a municipality and in the Vysočina Region
- Chlum, a village and part of Chlum-Korouhvice in the Vysočina Region
- Chlum, formally Děčín XXXIV-Chlum, a village and part of Děčín in the Ústí nad Labem Region
- Chlum, a village and part of Hartmanice (Klatovy District) in the Plzeň Region
- Chlum, a village and part of Hlinsko in the Pardubice Region
- Chlum, a village and part of Hluboká (Chrudim District) in the Pardubice Region
- Chlum, a village and part of Hořice in the Hradec Králové Region
- Chlum, a village and part of Jistebnice in the South Bohemian Region
- Chlum, a village and part of Krásné (Chrudim District) in the Pardubice Region
- Chlum, a village and part of Křemže in the South Bohemian Region
- Chlum, a village and part of Letovice in the South Moravian Region
- Chlum, a village and part of Lomnice nad Popelkou in the Liberec Region
- Chlum, a village and part of Nalžovice in the Central Bohemian Region
- Chlum, a hamlet and part of Přestavlky u Čerčan in the Central Bohemian Region
- Chlum, a village and part of Staňkovice (Kutná Hora District) in the Central Bohemian Region
- Chlum, a village and part of Svatý Jan nad Malší in the South Bohemian Region
- Chlum, a village and part of Volary in the South Bohemian Region
- Chlum, a village and part of Všestary (Hradec Králové District) in the Hradec Králové Region
- Chlum, a village and part of Zbýšov (Kutná Hora District) in the Central Bohemian Region
- Chlum-Korouhvice, a municipality in the Vysočina Region
- Chlum Svaté Maří, a municipality and village in the Karlovy Vary Region
- Chlum u Třeboně, a market town and in the South Bohemian Region

== See also ==
- Chlumec (disambiguation)
- Chlumek
- Chlumy
