= Hluboká =

Hluboká may refer to places in the Czech Republic:

- Hluboká (Chrudim District), a municipality and village in Pardubice Region
- Hluboká nad Vltavou, a town in the South Bohemian Region
  - Hluboká Castle, a castle in Hluboká nad Vltavou
- Hluboká, a village and part of Kdyně in the Plzeň Region
- Hluboká, a village and part of Krucemburk in the Vysočina Region
- Hluboká, officially Liberec XXVIII-Hluboká, a village and part of Liberec in the Liberec Region
- Hluboká, a village and part of Milhostov in the Karlovy Vary Region
- Hluboká, a village and part of Nalžovice in the Central Bohemian Region
- Hluboká, a village and part of Sruby in the Pardubice Region
- Hluboká, a village and part of Trhová Kamenice in the Pardubice Region
- Hluboká, a village and part of Žihle in the Plzeň Region

== See also ==
- Hluboké
