= Schlumpf =

Schlumpf is a surname. It is also the German word for smurf. (See also the link to the Wiktionary entry and the German version of this page.) Notable people with the surname include:

- Dominik Schlumpf (born 1991), Swiss ice hockey player
- Eveline Widmer-Schlumpf (born 1956), Swiss lawyer and politician
- Fabienne Schlumpf (born 1990), Swiss steeplechaser and marathon runner
- Fritz Schlumpf (1906–1992), French industrialist and car collector
- Hans Schlumpf (1904–1989), industrialist and car collector
- Leon Schlumpf (born 1925), Swiss politician
- Martin Schlumpf (born 1947), Swiss musician
- Wolfgang Schlumpf (1831–1904), Swiss-born Benedictine monk and missionary in the US

== See also ==
- Schlumpf Collection, the 500 car collection of Fritz and Hans Schlumpf, now the Cité de l'Automobile in Mulhouse, France
- Schlumpf Drive, a two-speed planetary gear bicycle bottom bracket
- Chlum (disambiguation)
- Slump (disambiguation)
