= Incumbent =

Current holder of a political office

The first inauguration of Abraham Lincoln, 1861. Inaugurations mark the start of a U.S. president's incumbency

The incumbent is the current holder of an office or position. In an election, the incumbent is the person holding or acting in the position that is up for election, regardless of whether they are seeking re-election.

There may or may not be an incumbent on the ballot: the previous holder may have died, retired, or resigned; they may not seek re-election, be barred from re-election due to term limits, or a new electoral division or position may have been created, at which point the office or position is regarded as vacant or open. In the United States, an election without an incumbent on the ballot is an open seat or open contest.

== Etymology ==
The term "incumbent" is loaned from Medieval Latin incumbens (-tis) 'holder of an ecclesiastical office', which is the substantivised present participle of the verb incumbo (-ĕre), originally meaning 'lay upon, lean or recline upon', and subsequently by extension 'press upon, burden', 'be incumbent upon one as a duty'.

== Incumbency advantage ==
In general, an incumbent has a political advantage over challengers at elections. Except when the timing of elections is determined by a constitution or by legislation, the incumbent in some countries may have the right to determine the date of an election.

For most political offices, the incumbent often has more name recognition due to their previous work in the office. Incumbents also have easier access to campaign finance, as well as government resources (such as the franking privilege) that can be indirectly used to boost the incumbent's re-election campaign.

In the United States, an election (especially for a single-member constituency in a legislature) in which an incumbent is not seeking re-election is often called an open seat; because of the lack of incumbency advantage, these are often amongst the most hotly contested races in any election. Also, an open contest is created when the term of office is limited, as in the case of terms of the U.S. president being restricted to two four-year terms, and the incumbent is prohibited from recontesting. Although the expected advantage of incumbency has gone from about two percentage points in the 1950s, to ten percentage points in the 1980s and 1990s, and then back to about two percentage points in the 2010s and 2020s, the probability that an incumbent will lose their seat has remained approximately the same over the entire period.

When newcomers look to fill an open office, voters tend to compare and contrast the candidates' qualifications, positions on political issues, and personal characteristics in a relatively straightforward way. Elections featuring an incumbent, on the other hand, are, as Guy Molyneux puts it, "fundamentally a referendum on the incumbent". Voters will first grapple with the record of the incumbent. Only if they decide to "fire" the incumbent do they begin to evaluate whether each of the challengers is an acceptable alternative.

A 2017 study in the British Journal of Political Science argues that the incumbency advantage stems from the fact that voters evaluate the incumbent's ideology individually whereas they assume that any challenger shares his party's ideology. This means that the incumbency advantage gets more significant as political polarization increases. A 2017 study in the Journal of Politics found that incumbents have "a far larger advantage" in on-cycle elections than in off-cycle elections.

=== Business usage ===
In relation to business operations and competition, an incumbent supplier is usually the supplier who currently supplies the needs of a customer and therefore has an advantageous position in relation to maintaining this role or agreeing a new contract, in comparison with competing businesses.

=== Sophomore surge ===
Political analysts in the United States and United Kingdom have noted the existence of a sophomore surge (not known as such in the United Kingdom) in which first term representatives see an increase in votes after their first election. This phenomenon is said to bring an advantage of up to 10% for first-term representatives, which increases the incumbency advantage. However, the extent of the surge is a biased estimate of the electoral advantage of incumbency.

== Anti-incumbency ==
There exist scenarios in which the incumbency factor itself leads to the downfall of the incumbent. Popularly known as the anti-incumbency factor, situations of this kind occur when the incumbent has proven themself not worthy of office during their tenure and the challengers demonstrate this to the voters. An anti-incumbency factor can also be responsible for bringing down incumbents who have been in office for many successive terms despite performance indicators, simply because the voters are convinced by the challengers of a need for change. It is also argued that the holders of extensively powerful offices are subject to immense pressure which leaves them politically impotent and unable to command enough public confidence for re-election; such is the case, for example, with the Presidency of France. Voters who experience the negative economic shock of a loss of income are less likely to vote for an incumbent candidate than those who have not experienced such a shock.

Nick Panagakis, a pollster, coined what he dubbed the incumbent rule in 1989—that any voter who claims to be undecided towards the end of the election will probably end up voting for a challenger.

In France, the phenomenon is known by the catchphrase Sortez les sortants ("Get out the outgoing [representatives]!"), which was the slogan of the Poujadist movement in the 1956 French legislative election.

== See also ==
- List of current heads of state and government
- Lists of office-holders
- Outgoing politician
  - List of presidents who did not win reelection
- Rally 'round the flag effect
- Sophomore surge
- Virtual incumbent
- Juncker curse
