= Sophomore (disambiguation) =

A sophomore in American English is a student in the second year of study at high school or college.

Sophomore or Sophomores may also refer to:

- "Sophomore" (song), a song by Ciara from her self-titled 2013 album
- Fleetwings BT-12 Sophomore, a 1940s American trainer airplane
- The Sophomore, a 1929 American comedy film directed by Leo McCarey

== See also ==
- Sophomore slump
- Sophomore surge
- Sophomore's dream
- Sophomoric humor
