= Slump =

Slump may refer to:

- Slump (economics), better known as a recession
- Slump (food), a variety of cobbler
- Slump (geology), a form of mass wasting event
- "Slump" (song), by South Korean boy band Stray Kids
- Slump (sports), a period in which a player or team performs below par
- Sophomore slump, a failed second effort following a successful introduction
- Senior slump, also known as senioritis, decreased motivation during a final year of studies
- Retirement slump, the average falloff in the party's vote when the incumbent retires
- Slumping, a categorical description of an area of techniques for the forming of glass by applying heat to the point where the glass becomes plastic
- Dr. Slump, anime and manga, character
- The workability of a concrete mixture, as determined by a concrete slump test
