= Retirement slump =

Falloff in votes when the incumbent retires

Retirement slump refers to the average falloff in the party's vote when the incumbent retires. A positive value of the sophomore surge represents an incumbency advantage. The retirement slump should be positive for an incumbency advantage to exist.

Sophomore surge is the average vote gain for freshman winners in election 1 who run again in election 2. Retirement slump is the average vote loss for the parties whose candidates won election 1 and did not run in election 2.

When a Sophomore surge and a Retirement slump combine, it is what is called a slurge.
