= Virtual incumbent =

A virtual incumbent or quasi-incumbent is a candidate in an election who campaigns as though they currently hold the office being contested, though the actual incumbent is not running for re-election. Traditionally, the virtual incumbent is the nominee from the party of the sitting office-holder. In the 2008 U.S. presidential election, however, virtual incumbency was also determined less formally, either by the policies of the actual candidates or the state of the polls.

== 2008 U.S. presidential election ==
Kevin Hassett used the idea in its traditional sense when discussing Ray Fair's model, which ties the incumbent's party to the current state of the economy. In 2008, however, argued Hassett,

"it may not be possible for the Democrats to portray the Republican candidate, who has taken his own principled stands on any number of issues throughout the past seven years, as a virtual incumbent. Hence, Senator John McCain may be spared the typical negative incumbent bounce in a recession."

The concept was used in a different way on Face the Nation on November 2, 2008, by Senator Lindsey Graham to describe Barack Obama's candidacy. In that case, the assumption was that the virtual incumbent, like an actual incumbent, would be held to a higher standard by the electorate, and would therefore be less likely to win in a tight race in a given state. This argument had been previously made by Dick Morris to suggest the likelihood that undecided voters would overwhelmingly vote for John McCain:

"But as Obama surged into a more or less permanent lead in October, animated by the financial crisis, he has assumed many of the characteristics of an incumbent. Every voter asks himself one question before he or she casts a ballot: Do I want to vote for Obama? His uniqueness, charisma and assertive program have so dominated the dialogue that the election is now a referendum on Obama."

John Fund described Obama as the "quasi-incumbent" on CNN Late Edition on November 2, 2008, by which he also meant that the election had become "referendum on Barack Obama".

David Plouffe, Obama's campaign manager, had previously described Hillary Clinton as the "quasi-incumbent" during the primaries. As in the case of Obama himself, the characterization is intended to "downplay expectations of [the challenger's] performance in upcoming polls". Katrina Vanden Heuvel has also used this term to describe Clinton: "Hillary Clinton started this race last year as the one to beat--she had the money, the machine and the name recognition that assured her of quasi-incumbent status. And, indeed, she ran as a quasi-incumbent, an establishment candidate in a change- year election."
