= Chlum (Rokycany District) =

- Municipality
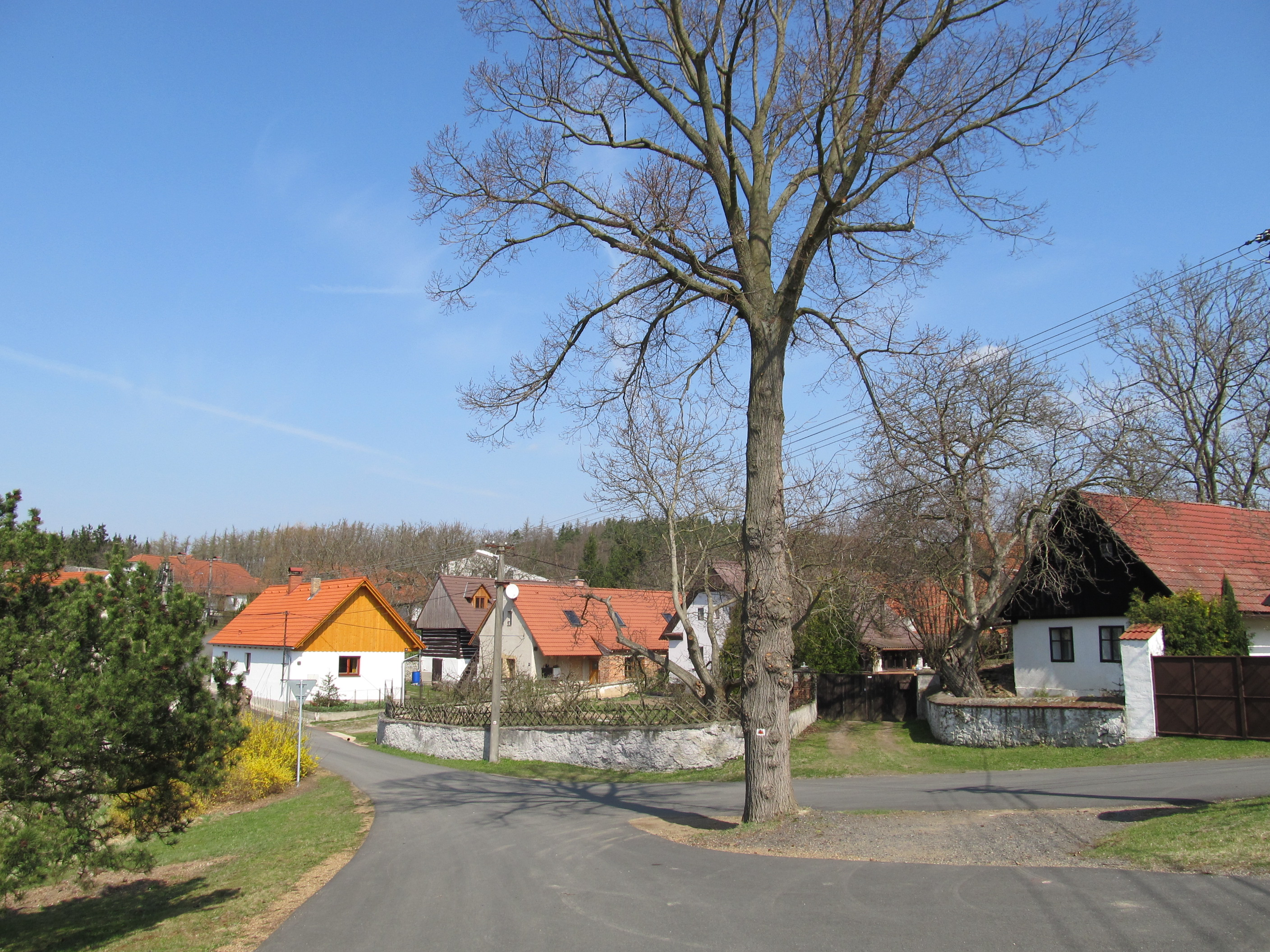
- Centre of Chlum

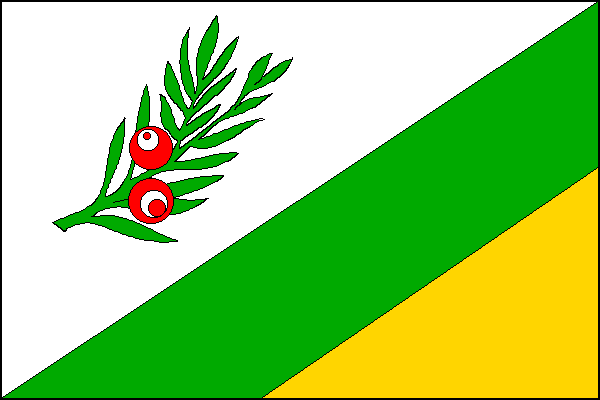
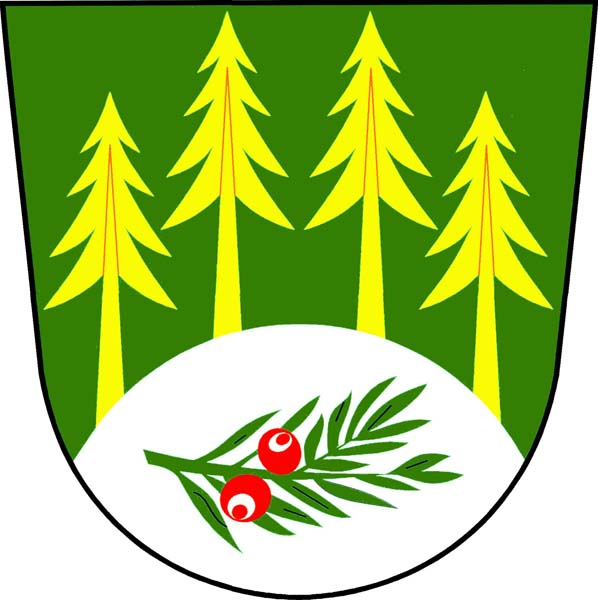
- Flag Coat of arms

- Location in the Czech Republic
- Coordinates: 49°56′9″N 13°39′35″E
- Country: Czech Republic
- Region: Plzeň
- District: Rokycany
- First mentioned: 1379

Area
  - Total: 8.56 km^{2} (3.31 sq mi)
- Elevation: 441 m (1,447 ft)

Population (2026-01-01)
  - Total: 50
  - Density: 5.8/km^{2} (15/sq mi)
- Time zone: UTC+1 (CET)
  - Summer (DST): UTC+2 (CEST)
- Postal code: 338 08
- Website: www.chlumnadberounkou.cz

Chlum is a municipality and village in Rokycany District in the Plzeň Region of the Czech Republic. It has about 50 inhabitants.

Chlum lies approximately 22 kilometres (14 mi) north of Rokycany, 30 km (19 mi) north-east of Plzeň, and 57 km (35 mi) west of Prague.

== Etymology ==
Chlum is a common Czech toponym. The word chlum meant 'hill' in old Czech.

== History ==
From 1848 to 1924, Chlum was part of Zvíkovec. From 1924 to 1980, it was an independent municipality. From 1 April 1980 to 23 November 1990, Chlum was a municipal part of Mlečice.

== Demographics ==
Historical population
| Year | Pop. | ±% |
|---|---|---|
| 1869 | 282 | — |
| 1880 | 279 | −1.1% |
| 1890 | 268 | −3.9% |
| 1900 | 259 | −3.4% |
| 1910 | 252 | −2.7% |
| 1921 | 273 | +8.3% |
| 1930 | 248 | −9.2% |
| 1950 | 157 | −36.7% |
| 1961 | 121 | −22.9% |
| 1970 | 109 | −9.9% |
| 1980 | 77 | −29.4% |
| 1991 | 52 | −32.5% |
| 2001 | 52 | +0.0% |
| 2011 | 53 | +1.9% |
| 2021 | 53 | +0.0% |
Source: Censuses
