= Chlumec =

Chlumec may refer to places in the Czech Republic:

- Chlumec (Český Krumlov District), a municipality and village in the South Bohemian Region
- Chlumec (Ústí nad Labem District), a town in the Ústí nad Labem Region
- Chlumec, a village and part of Dačice in the South Bohemian Region
- Chlumec, a village and part of Olešník in the South Bohemian Region
- Chlumec nad Cidlinou, a town in the Hradec Králové Region
- Velký Chlumec, a municipality and village in the Central Bohemian Region
- Vysoký Chlumec, a municipality and village in the Central Bohemian Region

== See also ==
- Kráľovský Chlmec, known until 1948 as Kráľovský Chlumec, a village in Slovakia
