= Chlum-Korouhvice =

- Municipality
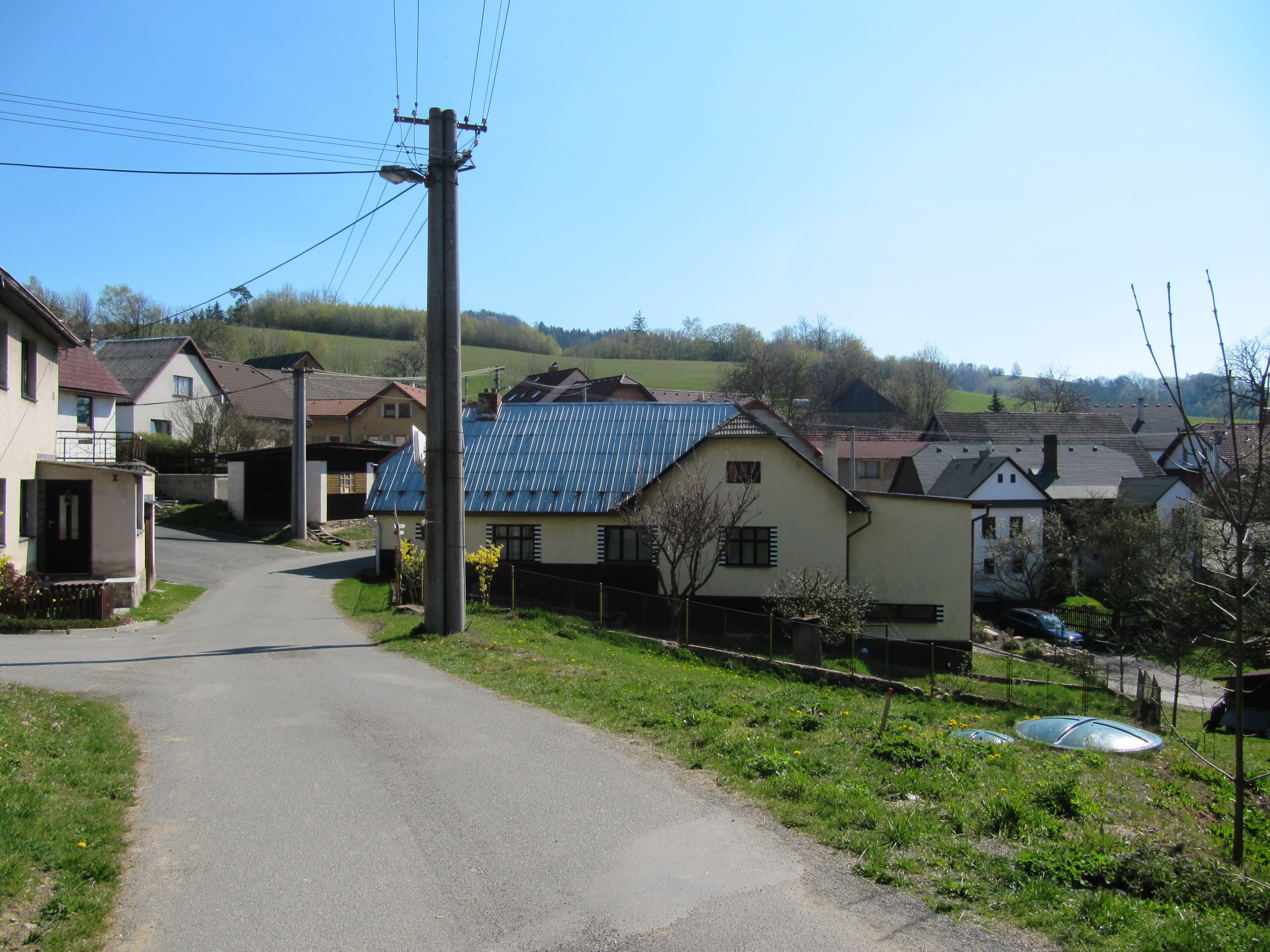
- The village of Chlum

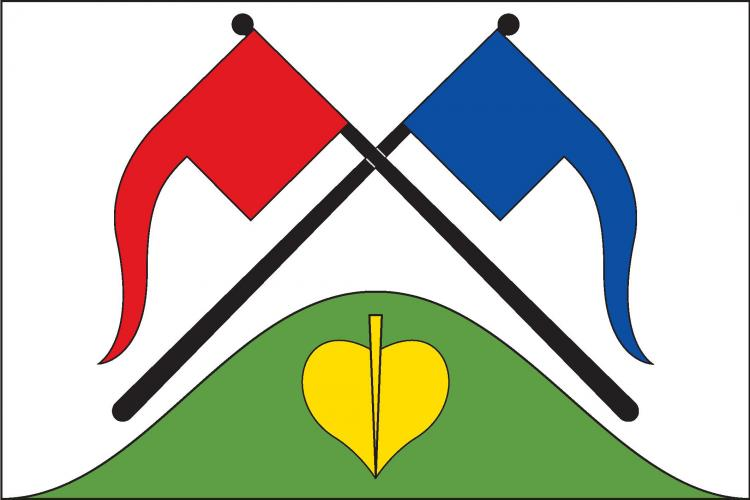
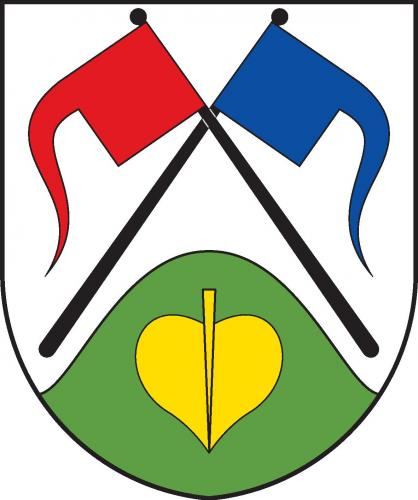
- Flag Coat of arms

- Location in the Czech Republic
- Coordinates: 49°34′33″N 16°19′15″E
- Country: Czech Republic
- Region: Vysočina
- District: Žďár nad Sázavou
- First mentioned: 1349

Area
  - Total: 4.02 km^{2} (1.55 sq mi)
- Elevation: 533 m (1,749 ft)

Population (2026-01-01)
  - Total: 40
  - Density: 10/km^{2} (26/sq mi)
- Time zone: UTC+1 (CET)
  - Summer (DST): UTC+2 (CEST)
- Postal code: 592 65
- Website: www.chlum-korouhvice.cz

Chlum-Korouhvice is a municipality in Žďár nad Sázavou District in the Vysočina Region of the Czech Republic. It has about 40 inhabitants.

Chlum-Korouhvice lies approximately 28 kilometres (17 mi) east of Žďár nad Sázavou, 57 km (35 mi) east of Jihlava, and 148 km (92 mi) south-east of Prague.

== Administrative division ==
Chlum-Korouhvice consists of two municipal parts (in brackets population according to the 2021 census):

- Chlum (34)
- Korouhvice (6)

== Demographics ==
Historical population
Year	Pop.	±%
1869	252	—
1880	220	−12.7%
1890	233	+5.9%
1900	235	+0.9%
1910	234	−0.4%
1921	210	−10.3%
1930	207	−1.4%
1950	157	−24.2%
1961	78	−50.3%
1970	66	−15.4%
1980	62	−6.1%
1991	66	+6.5%
2001	50	−24.2%
2011	44	−12.0%
2021	40	−9.1%
Source: Censuses
