= Chlum (Třebíč District) =

- Municipality
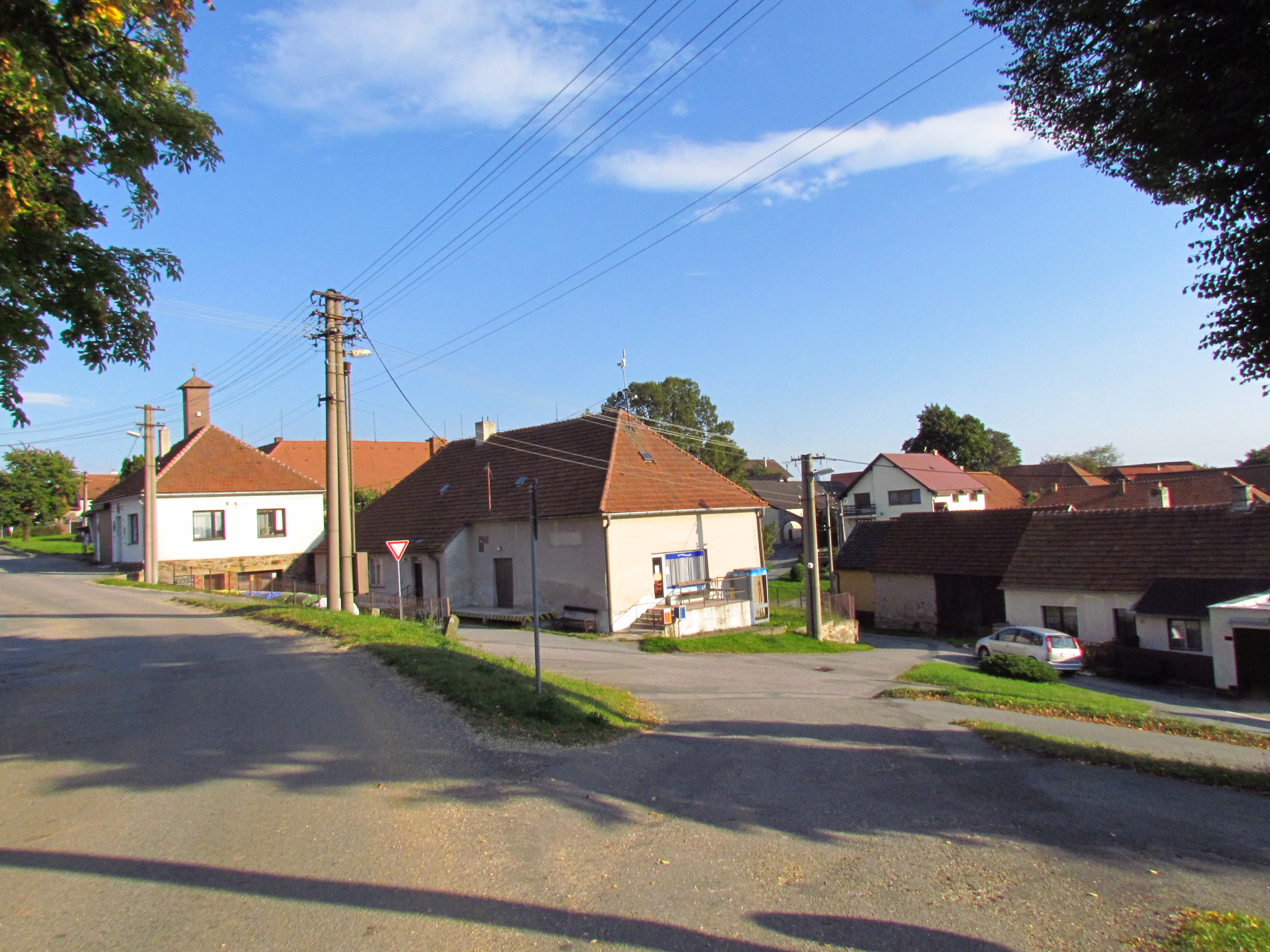
- Centre of Chlum

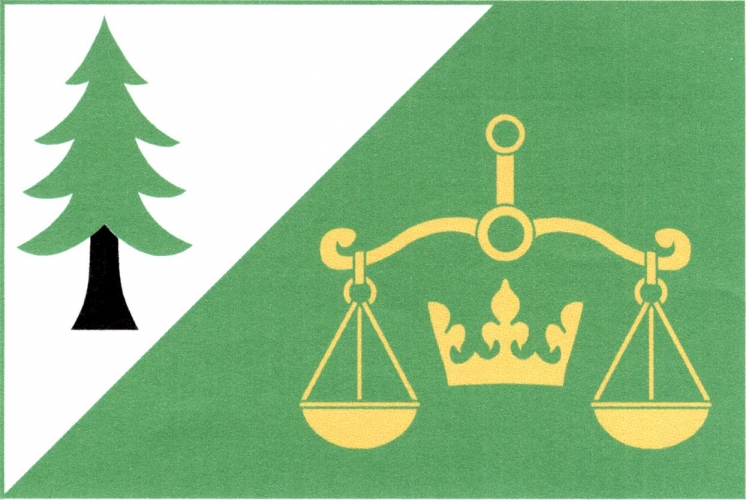
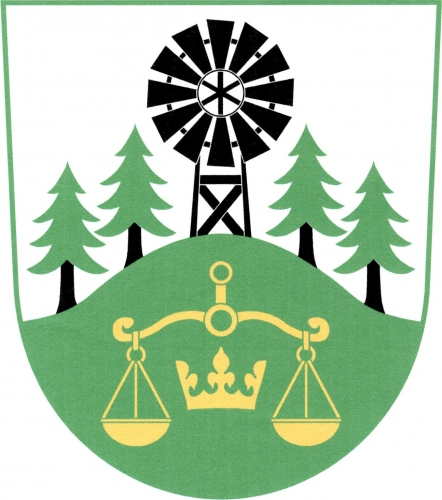
- Flag Coat of arms

- Location in the Czech Republic
- Coordinates: 49°18′48″N 15°46′1″E
- Country: Czech Republic
- Region: Vysočina
- District: Třebíč
- First mentioned: 1101

Area
  - Total: 6.93 km^{2} (2.68 sq mi)
- Elevation: 540 m (1,770 ft)

Population (2026-01-01)
  - Total: 140
  - Density: 20/km^{2} (52/sq mi)
- Time zone: UTC+1 (CET)
  - Summer (DST): UTC+2 (CEST)
- Postal code: 675 07
- Website: www.obecchlum.cz

Chlum is a municipality and village in Třebíč District in the Vysočina Region of the Czech Republic. It has about 100 inhabitants.

Chlum lies approximately 13 kilometres (8 mi) north-west of Třebíč, 17 km (11 mi) south-east of Jihlava, and 130 km (81 mi) south-east of Prague.

== Demographics ==
Historical population
Year	Pop.	±%
1869	345	—
1880	344	−0.3%
1890	301	−12.5%
1900	293	−2.7%
1910	292	−0.3%
1921	331	+13.4%
1930	336	+1.5%
1950	287	−14.6%
1961	302	+5.2%
1970	268	−11.3%
1980	230	−14.2%
1991	176	−23.5%
2001	153	−13.1%
2011	149	−2.6%
2021	148	−0.7%
Source: Censuses
