= Hluboké =

- Municipality
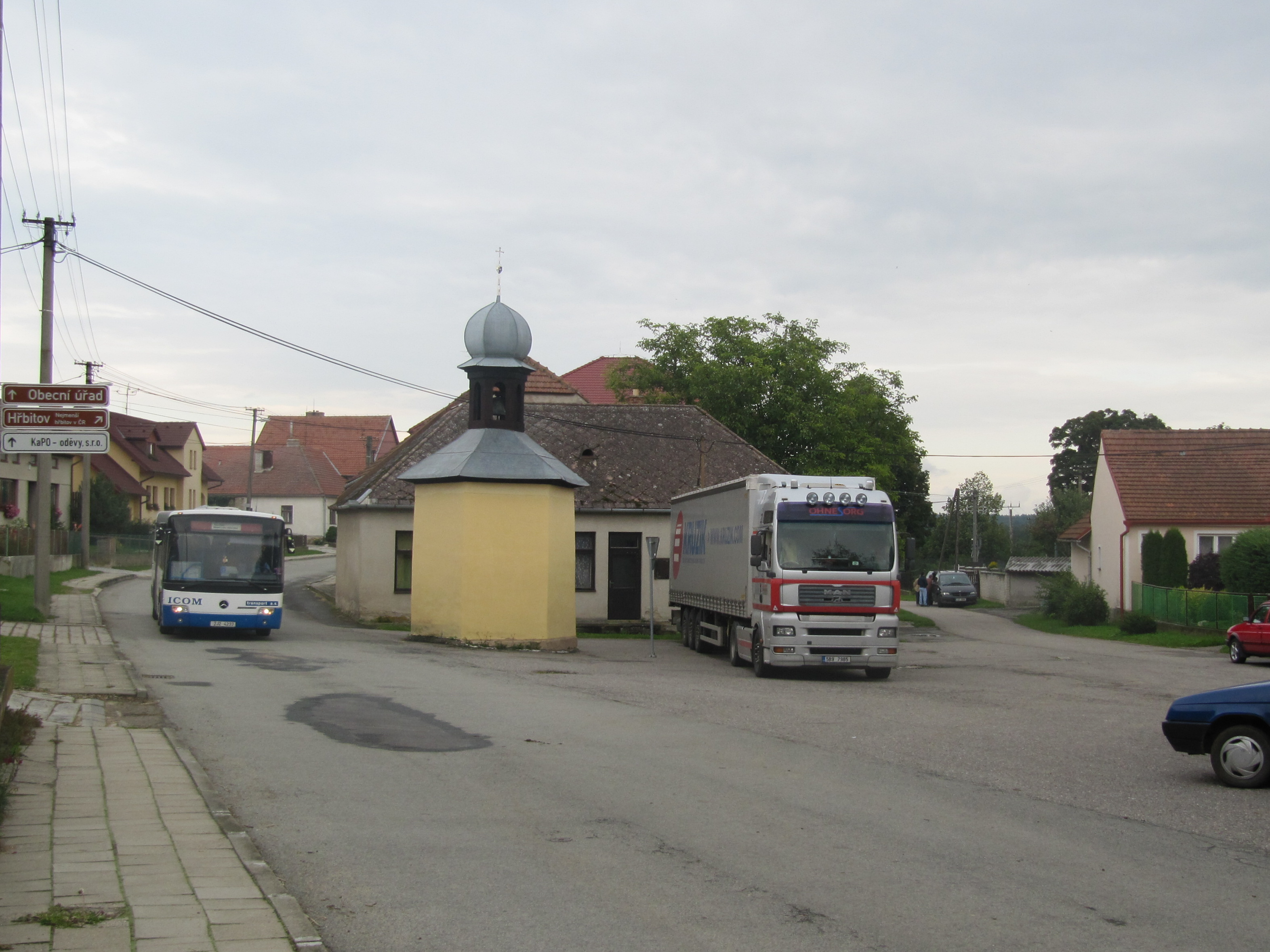
- Centre of Hluboké

- Flag Coat of arms

- Location in the Czech Republic
- Coordinates: 49°13′33″N 16°13′39″E
- Country: Czech Republic
- Region: Vysočina
- District: Třebíč
- First mentioned: 1349

Area
  - Total: 4.29 km^{2} (1.66 sq mi)
- Elevation: 460 m (1,510 ft)

Population (2026-01-01)
  - Total: 210
  - Density: 49/km^{2} (130/sq mi)
- Time zone: UTC+1 (CET)
  - Summer (DST): UTC+2 (CEST)
- Postal code: 675 71
- Website: www.hluboke.cz

Hluboké is a municipality and village in Třebíč District in the Vysočina Region of the Czech Republic. It has about 200 inhabitants.

Hluboké lies approximately 26 kilometres (16 mi) east of Třebíč, 51 km (32 mi) east of Jihlava, and 162 km (101 mi) south-east of Prague.

== Demographics ==
Historical population
Year	Pop.	±%
1869	323	—
1880	332	+2.8%
1890	332	+0.0%
1900	359	+8.1%
1910	351	−2.2%
1921	367	+4.6%
1930	352	−4.1%
1950	288	−18.2%
1961	311	+8.0%
1970	310	−0.3%
1980	268	−13.5%
1991	241	−10.1%
2001	223	−7.5%
2011	209	−6.3%
2021	191	−8.6%
Source: Censuses
