= Staňkovice (Kutná Hora District) =

- Municipality
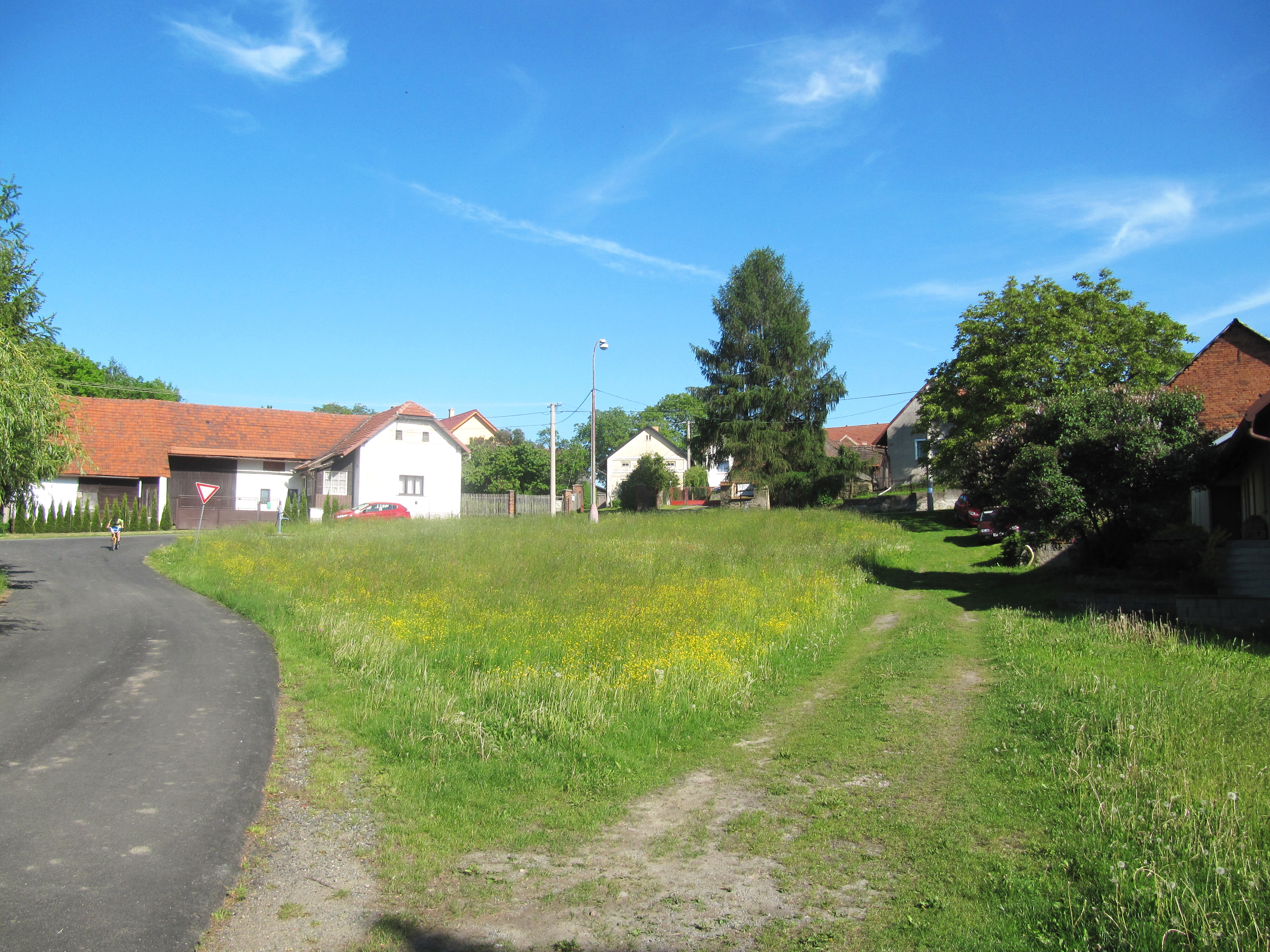
- Centre of Staňkovice

- Location in the Czech Republic
- Coordinates: 49°52′32″N 15°0′55″E
- Country: Czech Republic
- Region: Central Bohemian
- District: Kutná Hora
- First mentioned: 1226

Area
  - Total: 12.02 km^{2} (4.64 sq mi)
- Elevation: 432 m (1,417 ft)

Population (2026-01-01)
  - Total: 257
  - Density: 21.4/km^{2} (55.4/sq mi)
- Time zone: UTC+1 (CET)
  - Summer (DST): UTC+2 (CEST)
- Postal code: 285 04
- Website: stankovice.com

Staňkovice is a municipality and village in Kutná Hora District in the Central Bohemian Region of the Czech Republic. It has about 300 inhabitants.

== Administrative division ==
Staňkovice consists of five municipal parts (in brackets population according to the 2021 census):

- Staňkovice (94)
- Chlum (41)
- Nová Ves (51)
- Ostašov (26)
- Smilovice (47)

== Demographics ==
Historical population
Year	Pop.	±%
1869	761	—
1880	826	+8.5%
1890	903	+9.3%
1900	903	+0.0%
1910	810	−10.3%
1921	772	−4.7%
1930	671	−13.1%
1950	514	−23.4%
1961	465	−9.5%
1970	384	−17.4%
1980	312	−18.8%
1991	282	−9.6%
2001	246	−12.8%
2011	248	+0.8%
2021	259	+4.4%
Source: Censuses
