= Olešník =

- Municipality
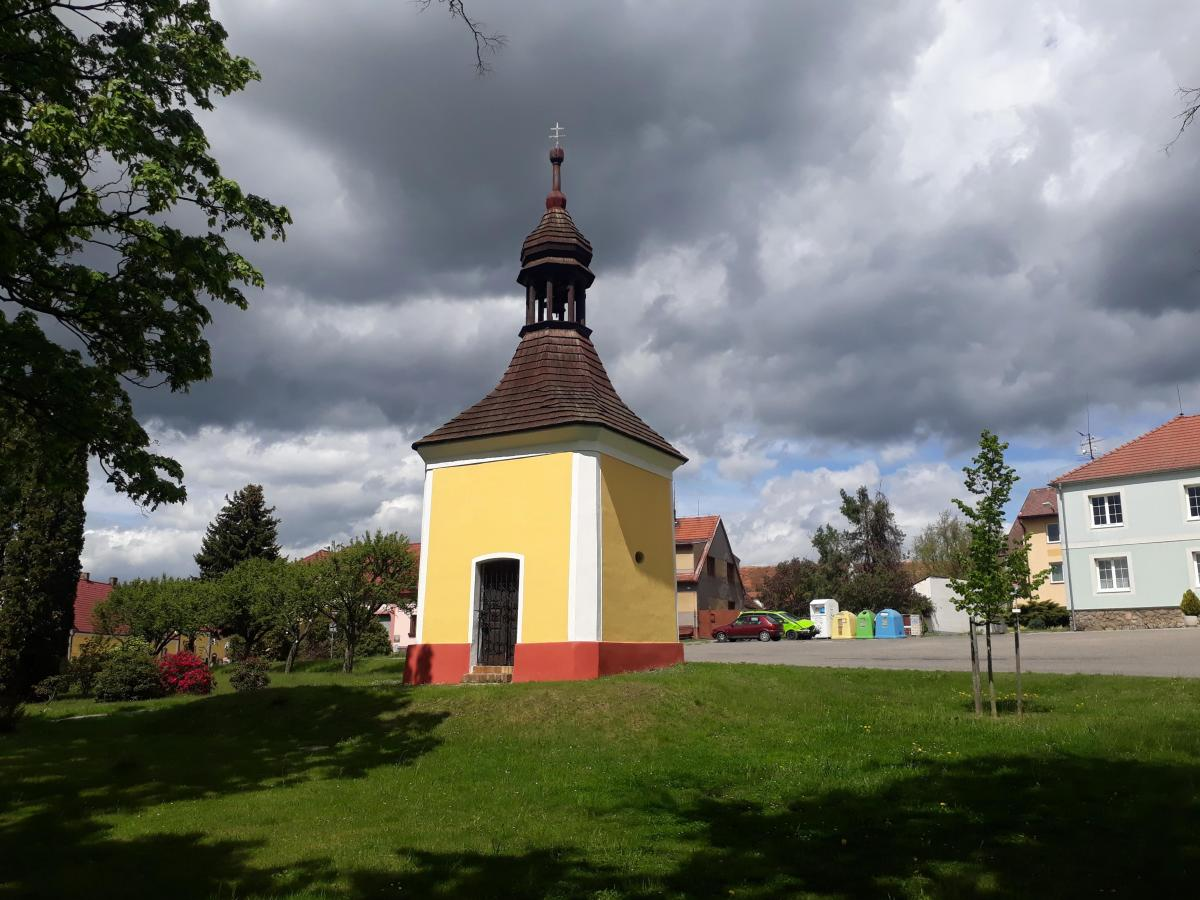
- Chapel in the centre

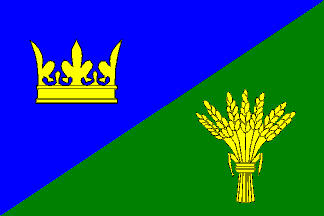
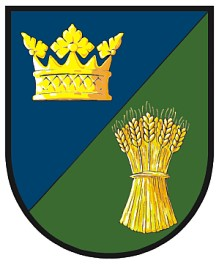
- Flag Coat of arms

- Location in the Czech Republic
- Coordinates: 49°6′26″N 14°21′50″E
- Country: Czech Republic
- Region: South Bohemian
- District: České Budějovice
- First mentioned: 1409

Area
  - Total: 23.51 km^{2} (9.08 sq mi)
- Elevation: 419 m (1,375 ft)

Population (2026-01-01)
  - Total: 832
  - Density: 35.4/km^{2} (91.7/sq mi)
- Time zone: UTC+1 (CET)
  - Summer (DST): UTC+2 (CEST)
- Postal code: 373 50
- Website: www.olesnik.cz

Olešník is a municipality and village in České Budějovice District in the South Bohemian Region of the Czech Republic. It has about 800 inhabitants.

Olešník lies approximately 17 kilometres (11 mi) north-west of České Budějovice and 109 km (68 mi) south of Prague.

== Administrative division ==
Olešník consists of three municipal parts (in brackets population according to the 2021 census):

- Olešník (595)
- Chlumec (137)
- Nová Ves (40)

== Demographics ==
Historical population
Year	Pop.	±%
1869	949	—
1880	928	−2.2%
1890	921	−0.8%
1900	913	−0.9%
1910	1,047	+14.7%
1921	1,142	+9.1%
1930	1,050	−8.1%
1950	918	−12.6%
1961	885	−3.6%
1970	787	−11.1%
1980	748	−5.0%
1991	741	−0.9%
2001	707	−4.6%
2011	751	+6.2%
2021	772	+2.8%
Source: Censuses
