= Chlumy =

- Municipality
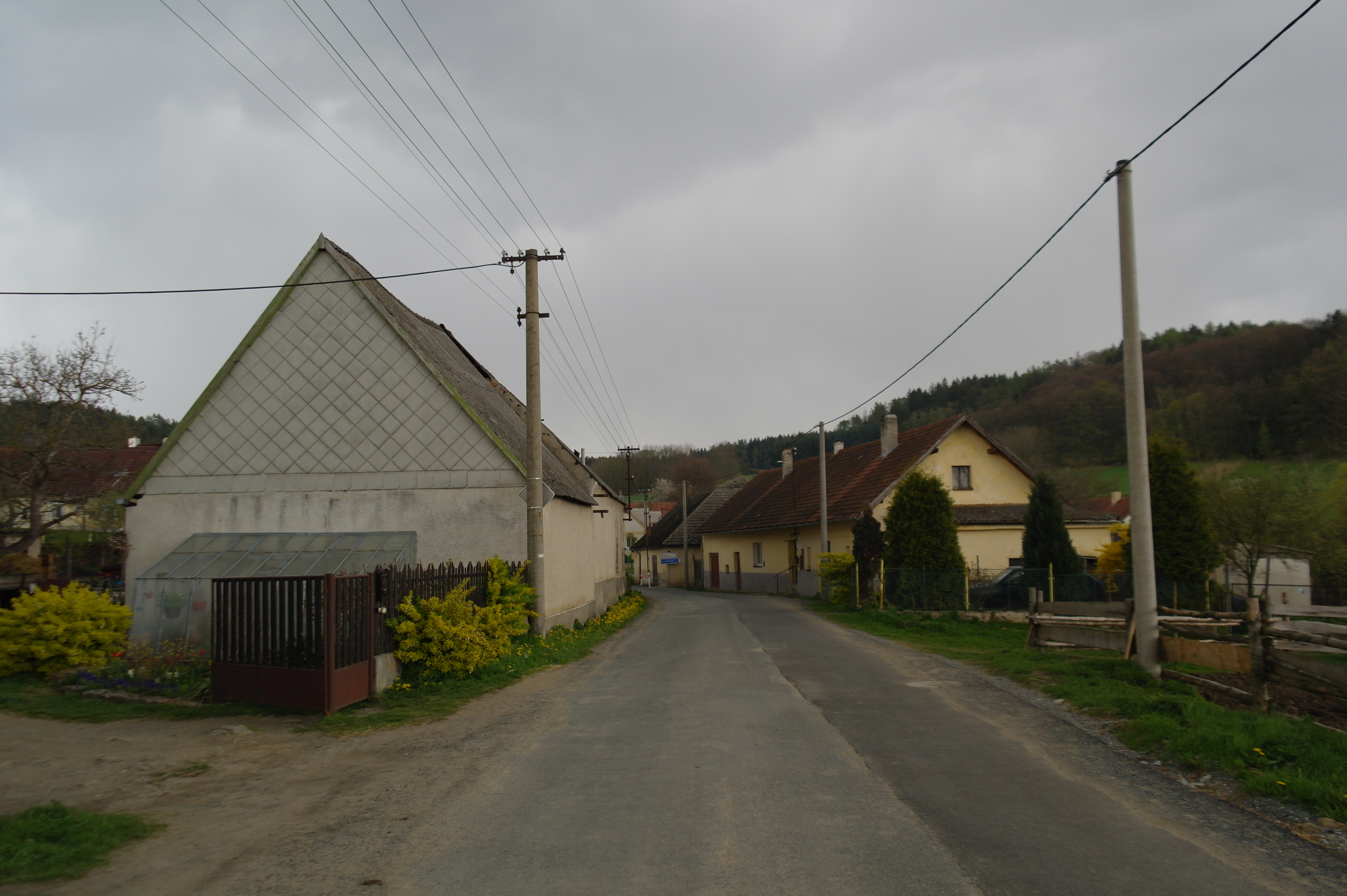
- Main street

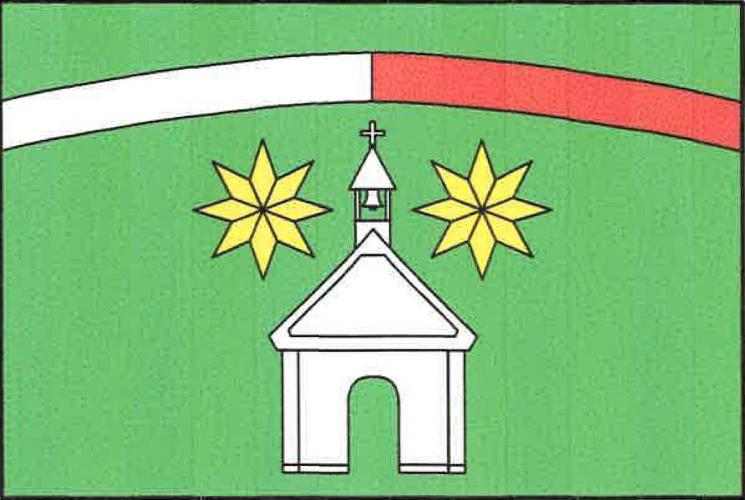
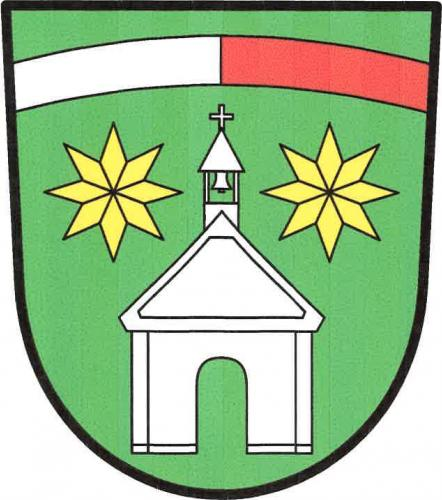
- Flag Coat of arms

- Location in the Czech Republic
- Coordinates: 49°26′16″N 13°38′19″E
- Country: Czech Republic
- Region: Plzeň
- District: Plzeň-South
- First mentioned: 1558

Area
  - Total: 3.70 km^{2} (1.43 sq mi)
- Elevation: 518 m (1,699 ft)

Population (2026-01-01)
  - Total: 100
  - Density: 27/km^{2} (70/sq mi)
- Time zone: UTC+1 (CET)
  - Summer (DST): UTC+2 (CEST)
- Postal code: 335 01
- Website: www.chlumy.cz

Chlumy is a municipality and village in Plzeň-South District in the Plzeň Region of the Czech Republic. It has about 100 inhabitants.

Chlumy lies approximately 40 kilometres (25 mi) south-east of Plzeň and 92 km (57 mi) south-west of Prague.

== Demographics ==
Historical population
Year	Pop.	±%
1869	292	—
1880	284	−2.7%
1890	298	+4.9%
1900	271	−9.1%
1910	258	−4.8%
1921	277	+7.4%
1930	250	−9.7%
1950	198	−20.8%
1961	201	+1.5%
1970	175	−12.9%
1980	134	−23.4%
1991	98	−26.9%
2001	90	−8.2%
2011	192	+113.3%
2021	88	−54.2%
Source: Censuses
