= Chlum (Česká Lípa District) =

- Municipality
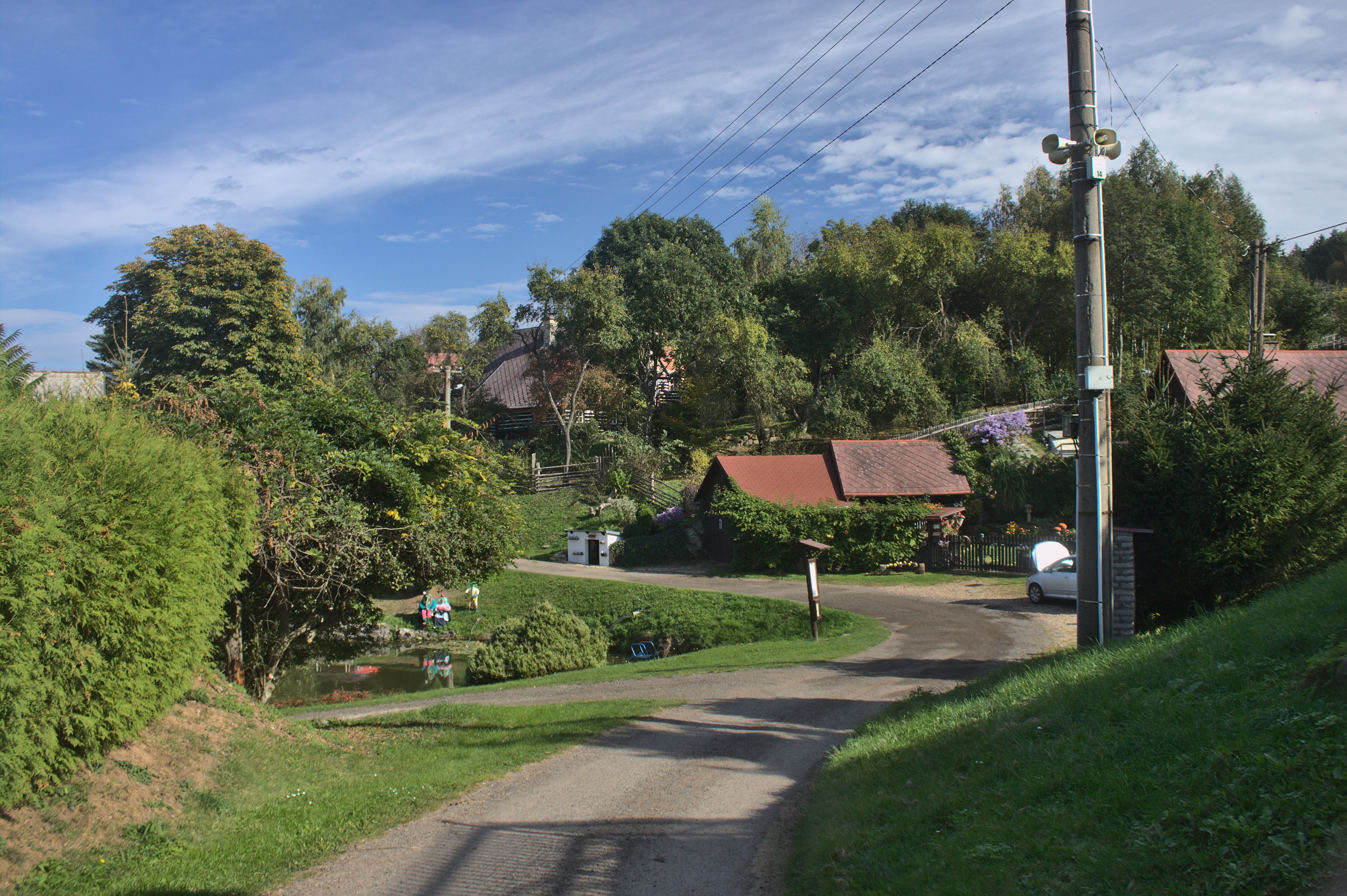
- Maršovice, a part of Chlum

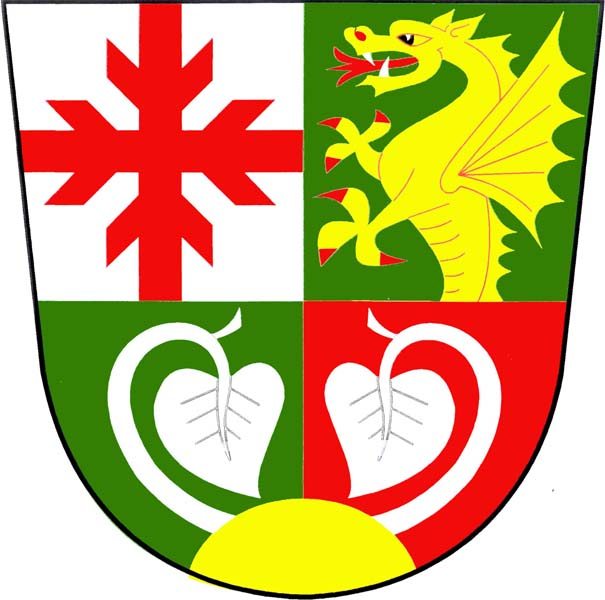
- Flag Coat of arms

- Location in the Czech Republic
- Coordinates: 50°34′43″N 14°33′46″E
- Country: Czech Republic
- Region: Liberec
- District: Česká Lípa
- First mentioned: 1264

Area
  - Total: 15.18 km^{2} (5.86 sq mi)
- Elevation: 332 m (1,089 ft)

Population (2026-01-01)
  - Total: 280
  - Density: 18/km^{2} (48/sq mi)
- Time zone: UTC+1 (CET)
  - Summer (DST): UTC+2 (CEST)
- Postal code: 472 01
- Website: www.ou-chlum.cz

Chlum (German: Klum) is a municipality and village in Česká Lípa District in the Liberec Region of the Czech Republic. It has about 300 inhabitants.

== Administrative division ==
Chlum consists of four municipal parts (in brackets population according to the 2021 census):

- Chlum (215)
- Drchlava (43)
- Hradiště (3)
- Maršovice (6)

== Etymology ==
Chlum is a common Czech toponym. The word chlum meant 'hill' in old Czech.

== Demographics ==
Historical population
Year	Pop.	±%
1869	988	—
1880	938	−5.1%
1890	909	−3.1%
1900	779	−14.3%
1910	779	+0.0%
1921	763	−2.1%
1930	786	+3.0%
1950	362	−53.9%
1961	362	+0.0%
1970	382	+5.5%
1980	286	−25.1%
1991	250	−12.6%
2001	275	+10.0%
2011	243	−11.6%
2021	267	+9.9%
Source: Censuses
