= Krásné (Chrudim District) =

- Municipality
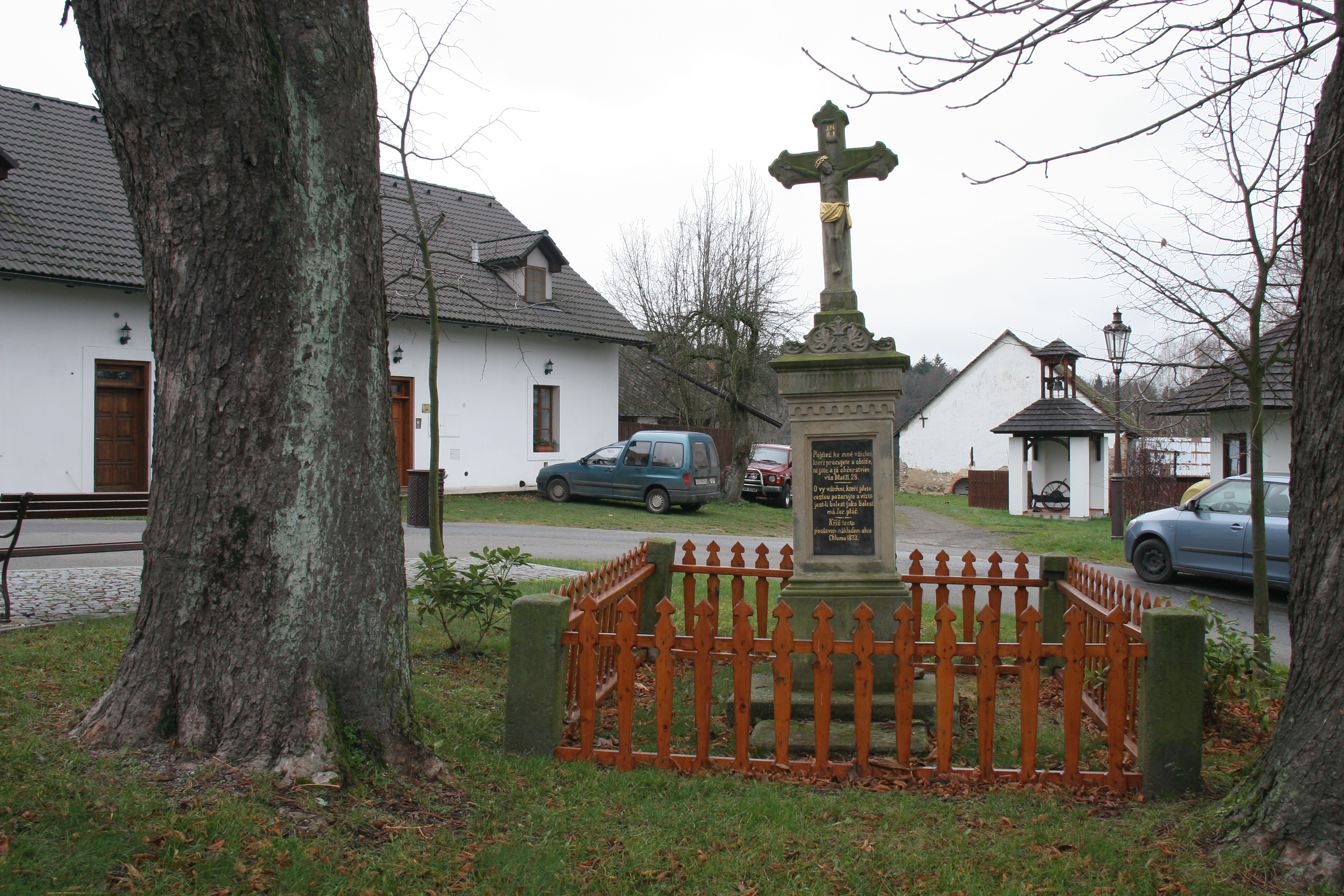
- Chlum, a part of Krásné

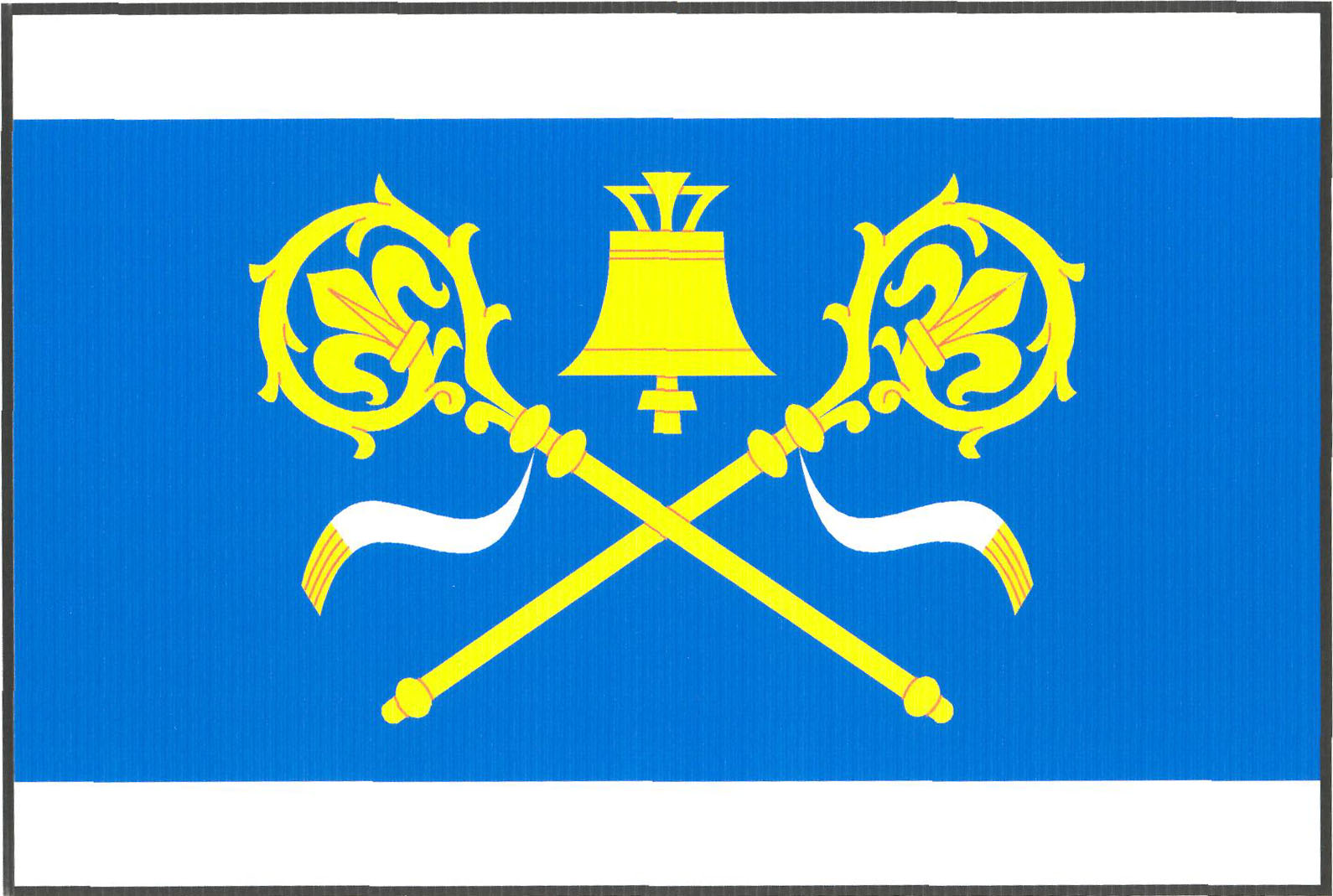
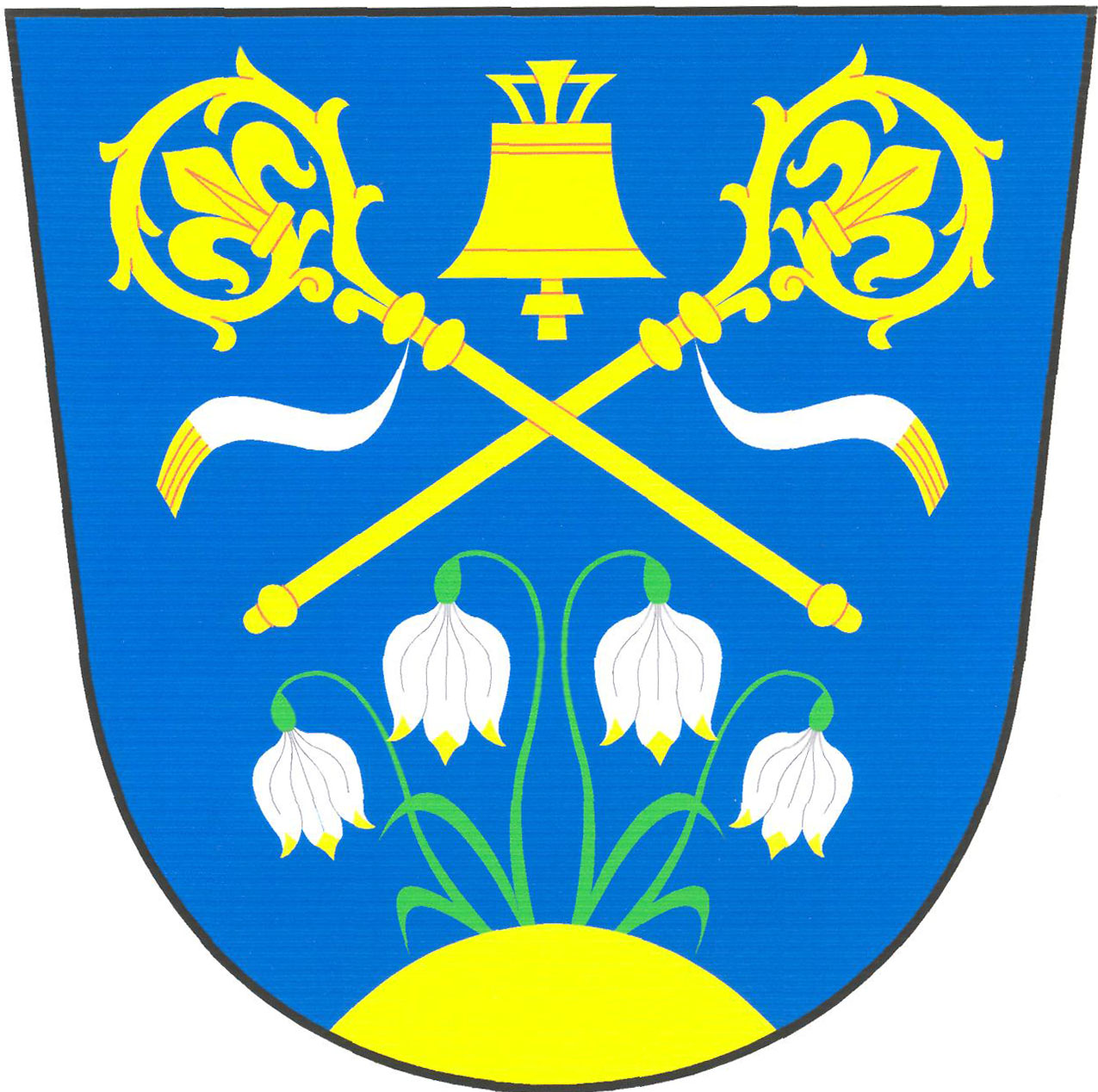
- Flag Coat of arms

- Location in the Czech Republic
- Coordinates: 49°4′4″N 15°55′0″E
- Country: Czech Republic
- Region: Pardubice
- District: Chrudim
- First mentioned: 1329

Area
  - Total: 7.25 km^{2} (2.80 sq mi)
- Elevation: 605 m (1,985 ft)

Population (2026-01-01)
  - Total: 156
  - Density: 21.5/km^{2} (55.7/sq mi)
- Time zone: UTC+1 (CET)
  - Summer (DST): UTC+2 (CEST)
- Postal code: 538 25
- Website: obeckrasne.cz

Krásné is a municipality and village in Chrudim District in the Pardubice Region of the Czech Republic. It has about 200 inhabitants.

== Administrative division ==
Krásné consists of three municipal parts (in brackets population according to the 2021 census):

- Krásné (79)
- Chlum (14)
- Polánka (60)

== Demographics ==
Historical population
Year	Pop.	±%
1869	469	—
1880	475	+1.3%
1890	409	−13.9%
1900	372	−9.0%
1910	397	+6.7%
1921	371	−6.5%
1930	362	−2.4%
1950	236	−34.8%
1961	238	+0.8%
1970	216	−9.2%
1980	205	−5.1%
1991	169	−17.6%
2001	150	−11.2%
2011	169	+12.7%
2021	153	−9.5%
Source: Censuses

== Sights ==
On the Krásný hill is a television transmitter with a 182-metre (597 ft) tall guyed steel tube mast. It was built in 1958–1960.
