= Mlečice =

- Municipality
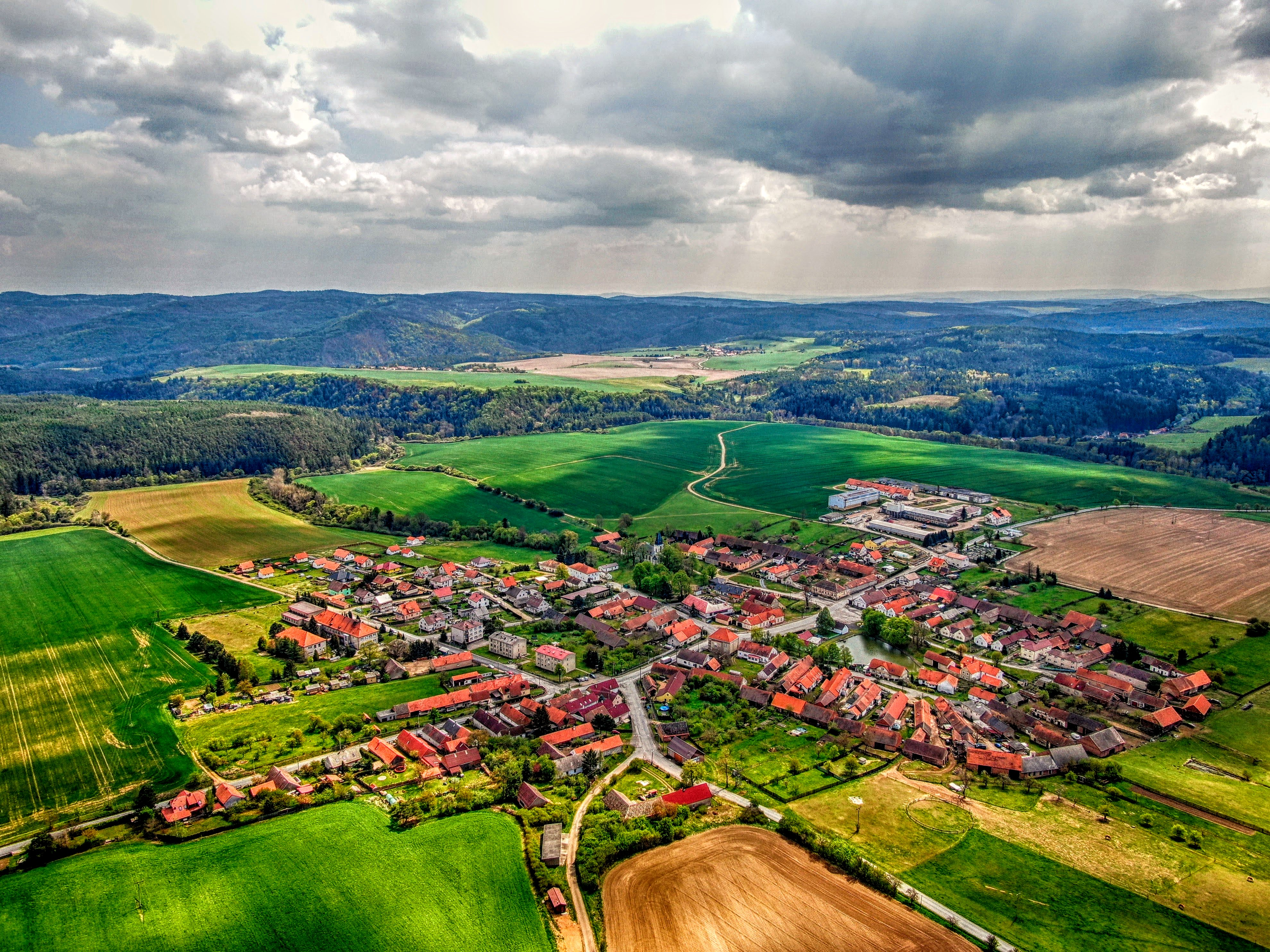
- Aerial view

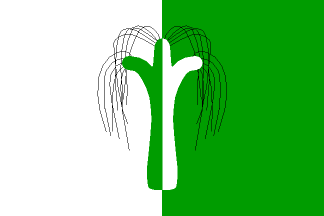
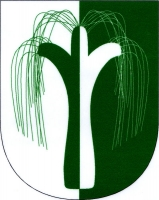
- Flag Coat of arms

- Location in the Czech Republic
- Coordinates: 49°55′13″N 13°41′46″E
- Country: Czech Republic
- Region: Plzeň
- District: Rokycany
- First mentioned: 1227

Area
  - Total: 10.68 km^{2} (4.12 sq mi)
- Elevation: 392 m (1,286 ft)

Population (2026-01-01)
  - Total: 335
  - Density: 31.4/km^{2} (81.2/sq mi)
- Time zone: UTC+1 (CET)
  - Summer (DST): UTC+2 (CEST)
- Postal code: 338 08
- Website: www.mlecice.cz

Mlečice is a municipality and village in Rokycany District in the Plzeň Region of the Czech Republic. It has about 300 inhabitants.

Mlečice lies approximately 21 kilometres (13 mi) north-east of Rokycany, 31 km (19 mi) north-east of Plzeň, and 55 km (34 mi) west of Prague.

== Administrative division ==
Mlečice consists of three municipal parts (in brackets population according to the 2021 census):

- Mlečice (239)
- Prašný Újezd (41)
- Skoupý (37)

== Demographics ==
Historical population
Year	Pop.	±%
1869	1,148	—
1880	1,137	−1.0%
1890	1,025	−9.9%
1900	972	−5.2%
1910	944	−2.9%
1921	840	−11.0%
1930	798	−5.0%
1950	543	−32.0%
1961	501	−7.7%
1970	439	−12.4%
1980	387	−11.8%
1991	354	−8.5%
2001	338	−4.5%
2011	283	−16.3%
2021	317	+12.0%
Source: Censuses
