= Chlum (Strakonice District) =

- Municipality
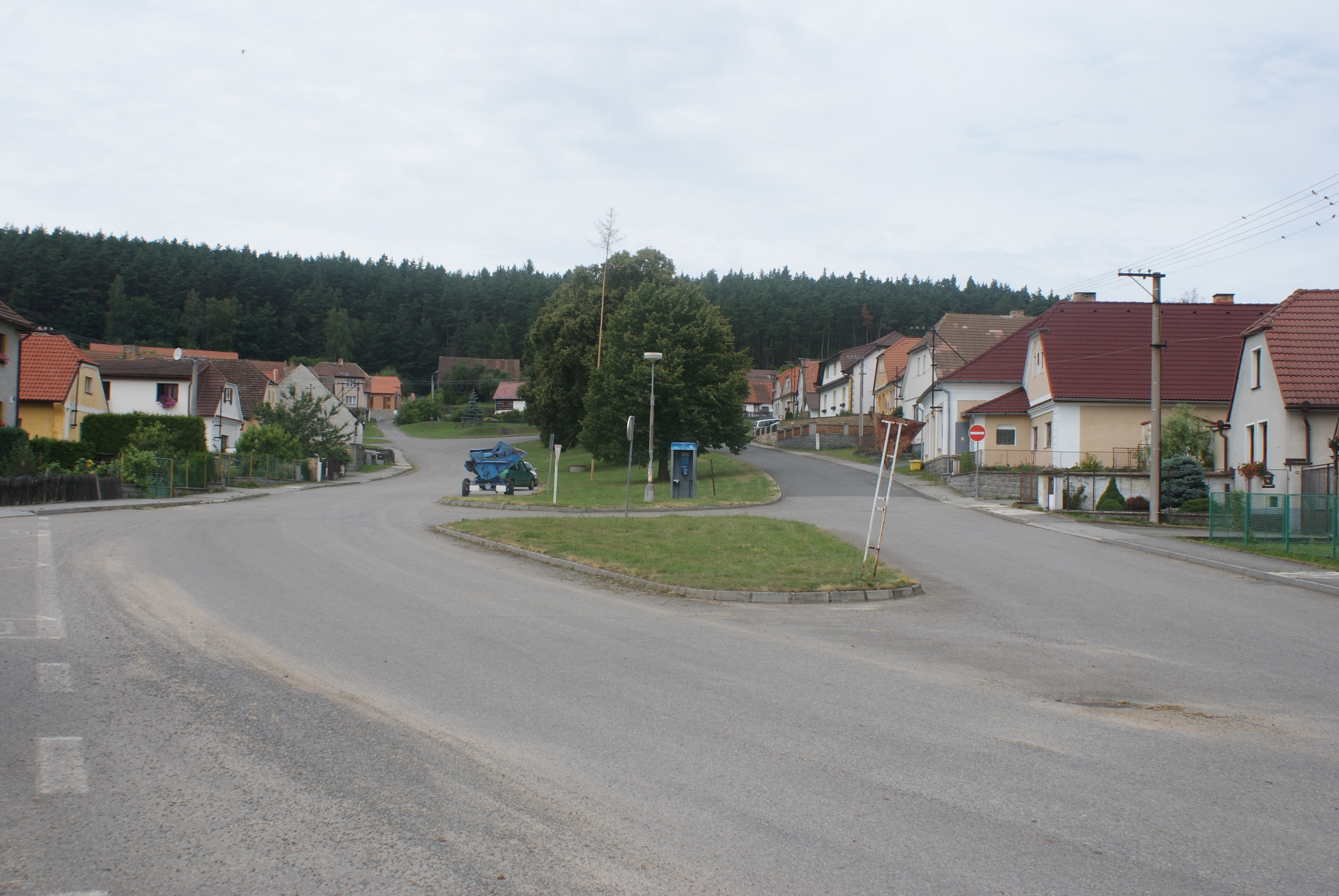
- Centre of Chlum

- Flag Coat of arms

- Location in the Czech Republic
- Coordinates: 49°26′50″N 13°51′4″E
- Country: Czech Republic
- Region: South Bohemian
- District: Strakonice
- First mentioned: 1349

Area
  - Total: 6.21 km^{2} (2.40 sq mi)
- Elevation: 473 m (1,552 ft)

Population (2026-01-01)
  - Total: 200
  - Density: 32/km^{2} (83/sq mi)
- Time zone: UTC+1 (CET)
  - Summer (DST): UTC+2 (CEST)
- Postal code: 388 01
- Website: www.chlum-blatna.cz

Chlum is a municipality and village in Strakonice District in the South Bohemian Region of the Czech Republic. It has about 200 inhabitants.

Chlum lies approximately 22 kilometres (14 mi) north of Strakonice, 70 km (43 mi) north-west of České Budějovice, and 82 km (51 mi) south-west of Prague.

== Etymology ==
Chlum is a common Czech toponym. The word chlum meant 'hill' in old Czech.

== Demographics ==
Historical population
Year	Pop.	±%
1869	292	—
1880	288	−1.4%
1890	298	+3.5%
1900	323	+8.4%
1910	335	+3.7%
1921	291	−13.1%
1930	276	−5.2%
1950	227	−17.8%
1961	194	−14.5%
1970	179	−7.7%
1980	176	−1.7%
1991	159	−9.7%
2001	173	+8.8%
2011	200	+15.6%
2021	197	−1.5%
Source: Censuses
