= Chlum (Plzeň-South District) =

- Municipality
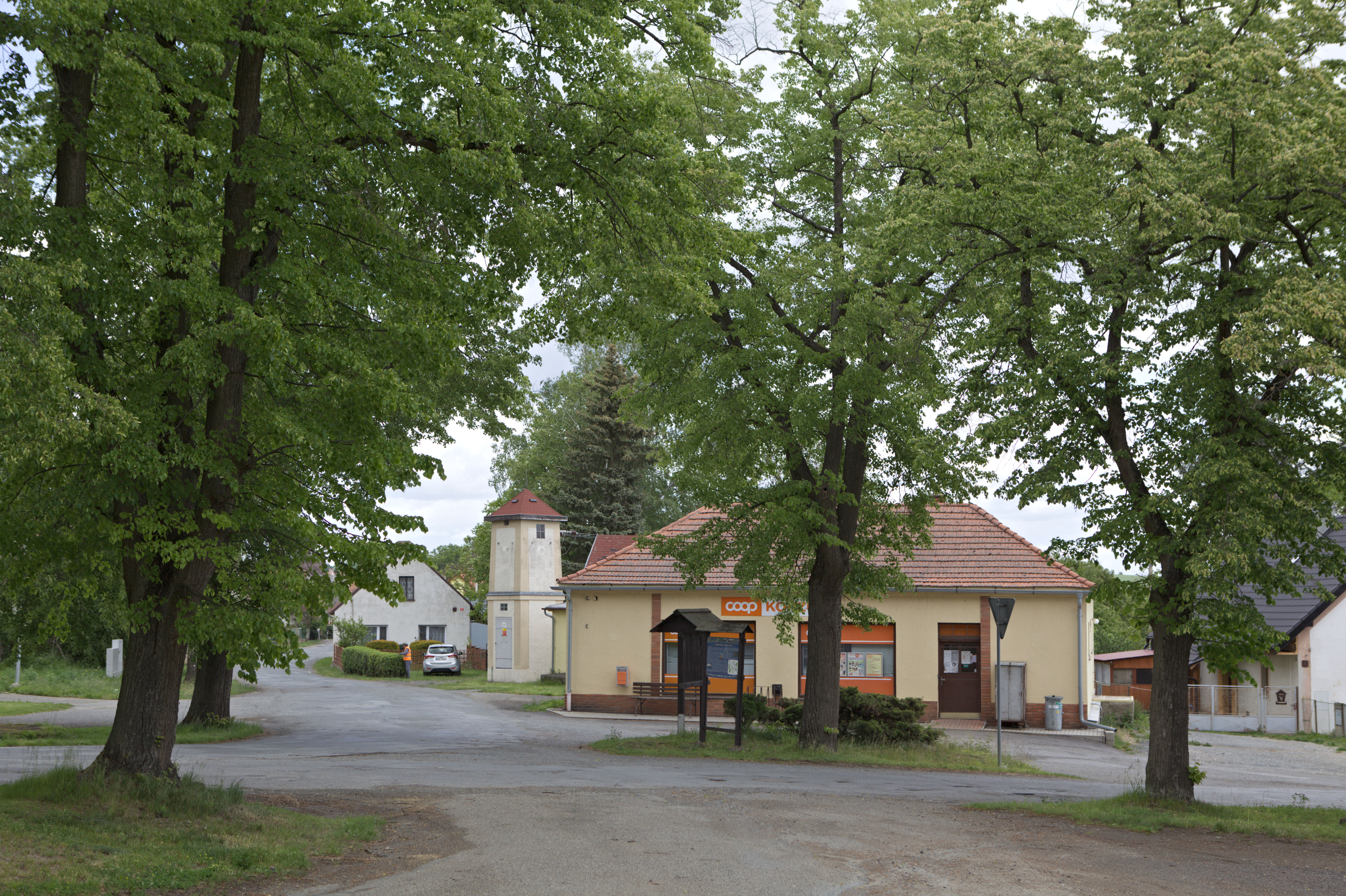
- Centre of Chlum

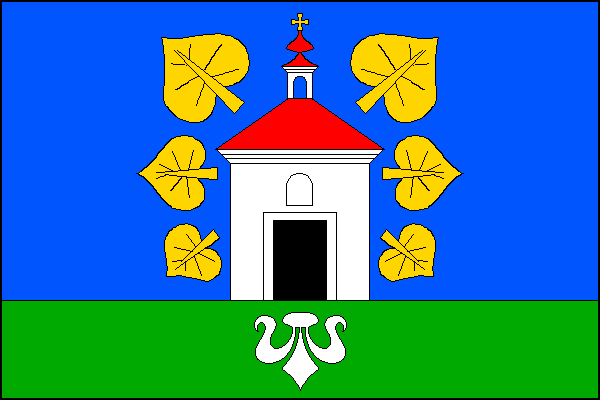
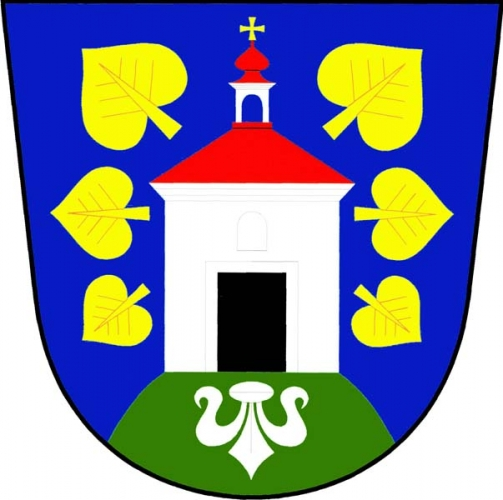
- Flag Coat of arms

- Location in the Czech Republic
- Coordinates: 49°36′19″N 13°28′45″E
- Country: Czech Republic
- Region: Plzeň
- District: Plzeň-South
- First mentioned: 1379

Area
  - Total: 4.05 km^{2} (1.56 sq mi)
- Elevation: 496 m (1,627 ft)

Population (2026-01-01)
  - Total: 240
  - Density: 59/km^{2} (150/sq mi)
- Time zone: UTC+1 (CET)
  - Summer (DST): UTC+2 (CEST)
- Postal code: 332 04
- Website: www.obec-chlum.cz

Chlum is a municipality and village in Plzeň-South District in the Plzeň Region of the Czech Republic. It has about 200 inhabitants.

== Etymology ==
Chlum is a common Czech toponym. The word chlum used to mean 'hill' in Czech.

== Geography ==
Chlum is located about 15 kilometres (9 mi) southeast of Plzeň. It lies in the Švihov Highlands. The highest point is the hill Pahorek at 549 m (1,801 ft) above sea level.

== Demographics ==
Historical population
Year	Pop.	±%
1869	324	—
1880	296	−8.6%
1890	290	−2.0%
1900	312	+7.6%
1910	299	−4.2%
1921	293	−2.0%
1930	325	+10.9%
1950	246	−24.3%
1961	232	−5.7%
1970	192	−17.2%
1980	194	+1.0%
1991	181	−6.7%
2001	184	+1.7%
2011	214	+16.3%
2021	227	+6.1%
Source: Censuses
