= Chlum (Benešov District) =

- Municipality
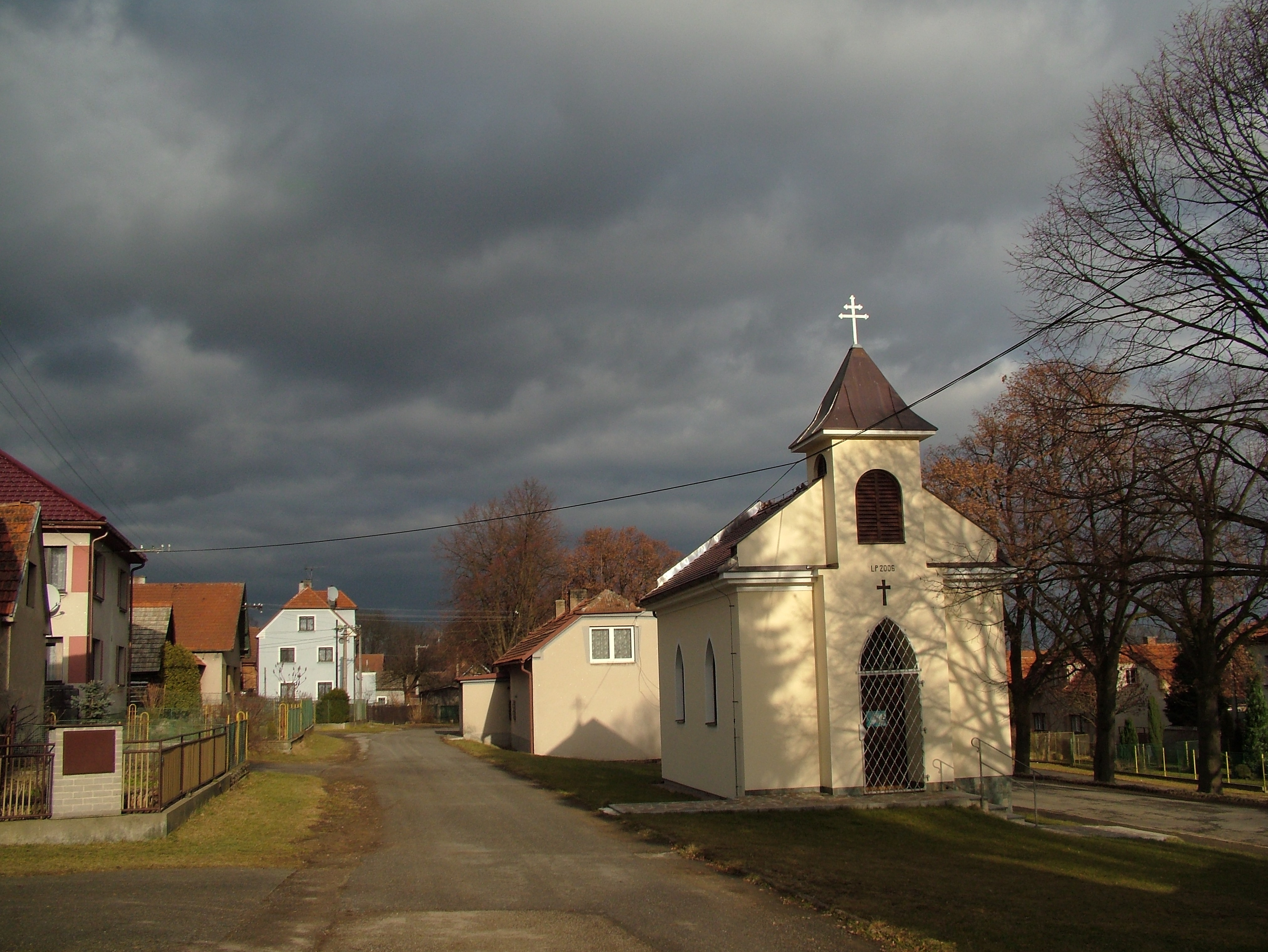
- Centre of Chlum

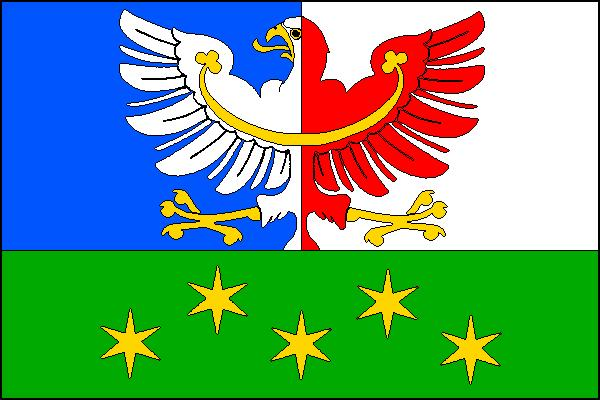
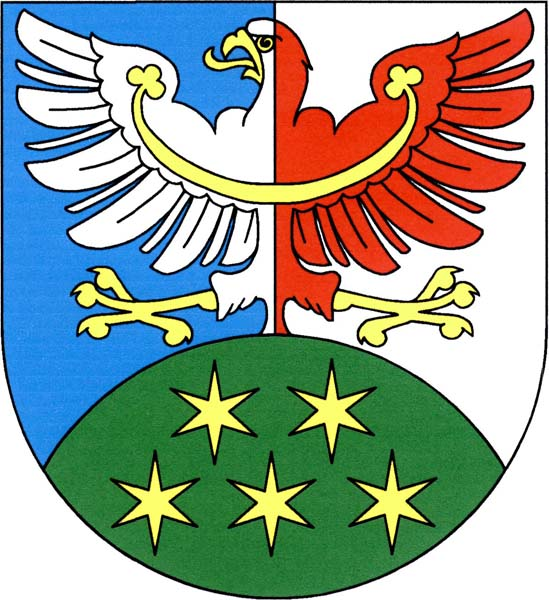
- Flag Coat of arms

- Location in the Czech Republic
- Coordinates: 49°41′35″N 14°59′45″E
- Country: Czech Republic
- Region: Central Bohemian
- District: Benešov
- First mentioned: 1295

Area
  - Total: 4.19 km^{2} (1.62 sq mi)
- Elevation: 443 m (1,453 ft)

Population (2026-01-01)
  - Total: 124
  - Density: 29.6/km^{2} (76.6/sq mi)
- Time zone: UTC+1 (CET)
  - Summer (DST): UTC+2 (CEST)
- Postal code: 257 63
- Website: www.chlumuvlasimi.cz

Chlum is a municipality and village in Benešov District in the Central Bohemian Region of the Czech Republic. It has about 100 inhabitants.

== Etymology ==
Chlum is a common Czech toponym. The word chlum meant 'hill' in old Czech.

== Demographics ==
Historical population
Year	Pop.	±%
1869	246	—
1880	271	+10.2%
1890	249	−8.1%
1900	240	−3.6%
1910	249	+3.8%
1921	239	−4.0%
1930	203	−15.1%
1950	184	−9.4%
1961	170	−7.6%
1970	180	+5.9%
1980	167	−7.2%
1991	153	−8.4%
2001	141	−7.8%
2011	134	−5.0%
2021	118	−11.9%
Source: Censuses
