= Přestavlky u Čerčan =

- Municipality
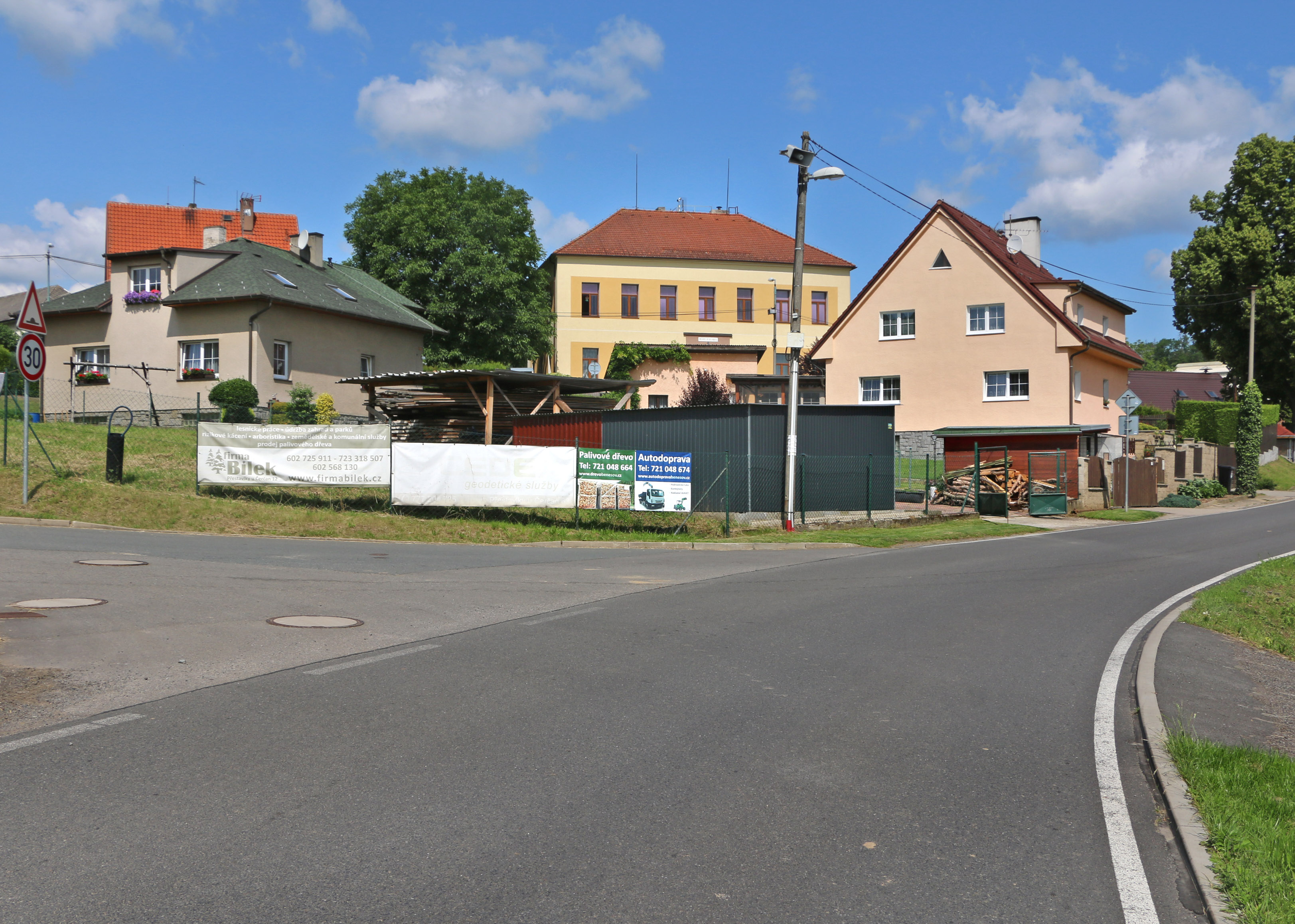
- Centre of Přestavlky u Čerčan

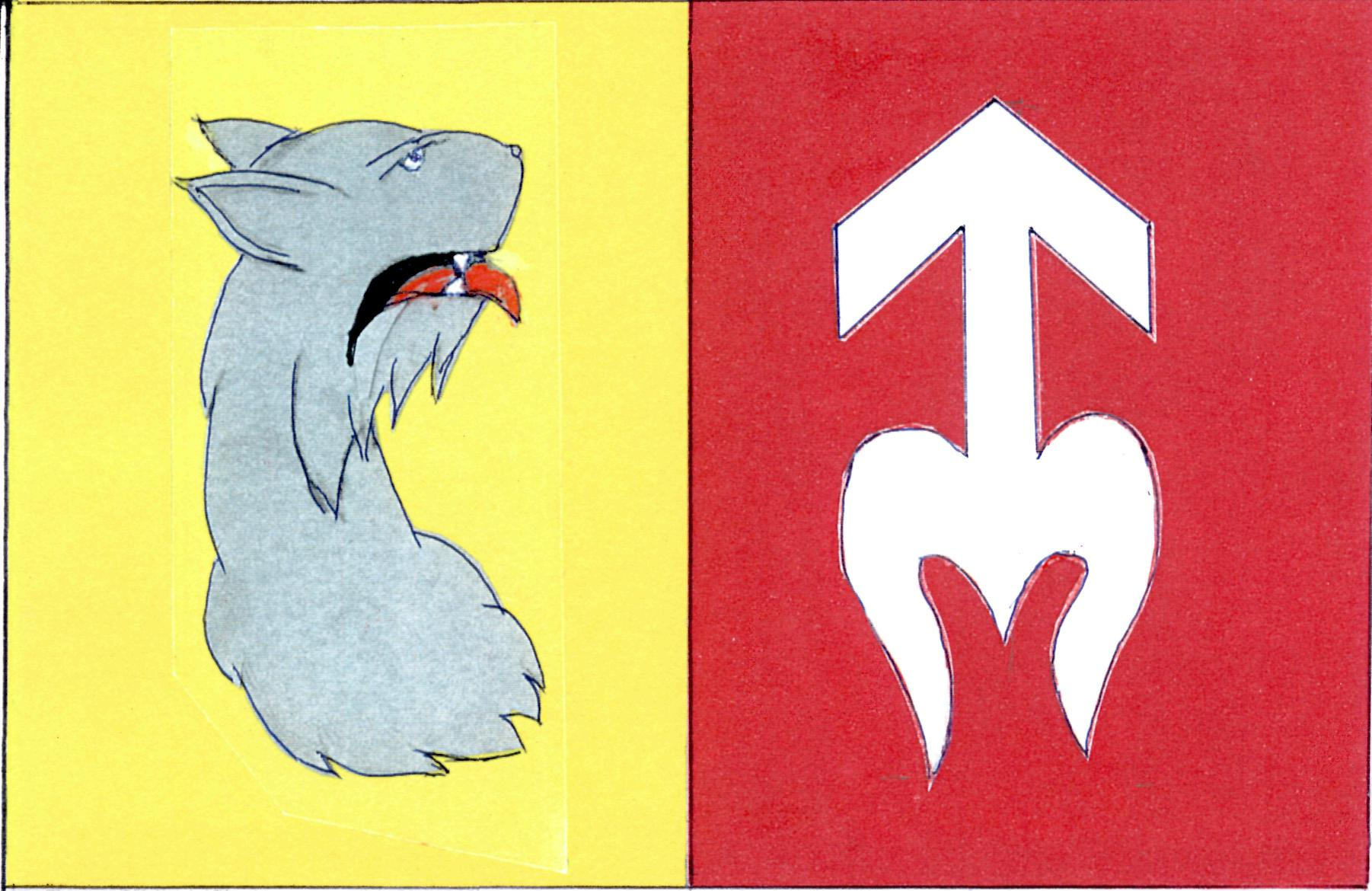
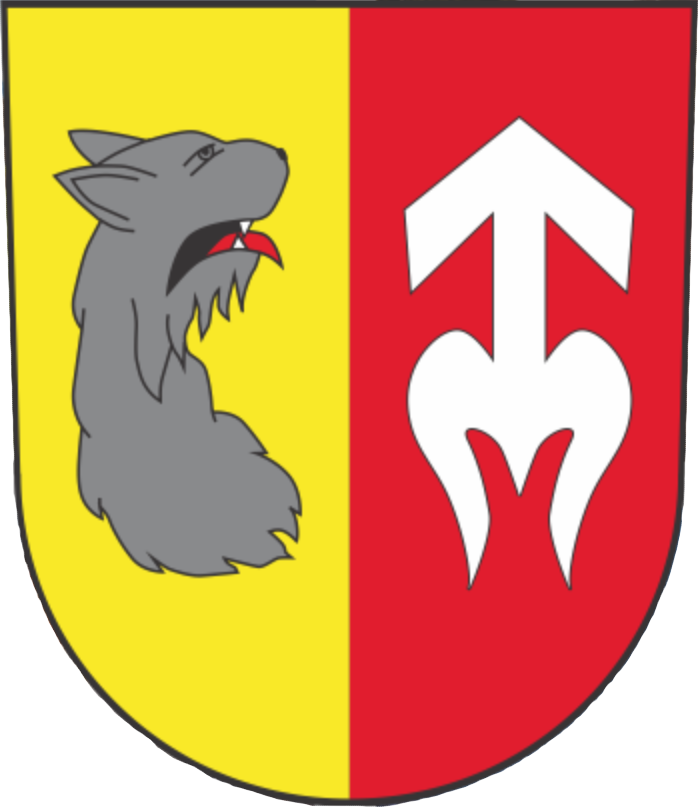
- Flag Coat of arms

- Location in the Czech Republic
- Coordinates: 49°51′11″N 14°44′39″E
- Country: Czech Republic
- Region: Central Bohemian
- District: Benešov
- First mentioned: 1228

Area
  - Total: 6.48 km^{2} (2.50 sq mi)
- Elevation: 429 m (1,407 ft)

Population (2026-01-01)
  - Total: 446
  - Density: 68.8/km^{2} (178/sq mi)
- Time zone: UTC+1 (CET)
  - Summer (DST): UTC+2 (CEST)
- Postal codes: 257 22, 257 23
- Website: www.prestavlkyucercan.cz

Přestavlky u Čerčan is a municipality and village in Benešov District in the Central Bohemian Region of the Czech Republic. It has about 400 inhabitants.

== Administrative division ==
Přestavlky u Čerčan consists of six municipal parts (in brackets population according to the 2021 census):

- Přestavlky u Čerčan (295)
- Borka (67)
- Chlum (0)
- Čistec (31)
- Doubravice 1.díl (24)
- Dubsko (12)

== Etymology ==
The name Přestavlky is derived from the old Czech word přestavlk, denoting a person who "stopped [chasing] wolves" (přestal [pronásledovat] vlky).

== Geography ==
Přestavlky u Čerčan is located about 8 kilometres (5 mi) northeast of Benešov and 27 km (17 mi) southeast of Prague. It lies in the Benešov Uplands. The highest point is a hill at 521 m (1,709 ft) above sea level. The Sázava River flows along the northern municipal border.

== History ==
The first written mention of Přestavlky is from 1228. Around 1400, Lords of Dubá acquired the village. In 1428, Přestavlky was bought by Perchta of Kravaře. In the following years, the village often changed owners. In the middle of the 15th century, the royal chamber donated the village to Zdeněk Kostka of Postupice, who annexed it to the Čejchanov estate (later known as Komorní Hrádek estate). From that time until the abolishment of serfdom in 1848, Přestavlky belonged to the Komorní Hrádek estate and shared its owners.

== Demographics ==
Historical population

Year	Pop.	±%
1869	552	—
1880	585	+6.0%
1890	587	+0.3%
1900	527	−10.2%
1910	465	−11.8%

Year	Pop.	±%
1921	452	−2.8%
1930	415	−8.2%
1950	492	+18.6%
1961	332	−32.5%
1970	307	−7.5%

Year	Pop.	±%
1980	262	−14.7%
1991	251	−4.2%
2001	255	+1.6%
2011	346	+35.7%
2021	429	+24.0%

Source: Censuses

== Transport ==
The railway line Čerčany–Zruč nad Sázavou passes through the northern part of the municipality, but there is no train station.

== Sights ==
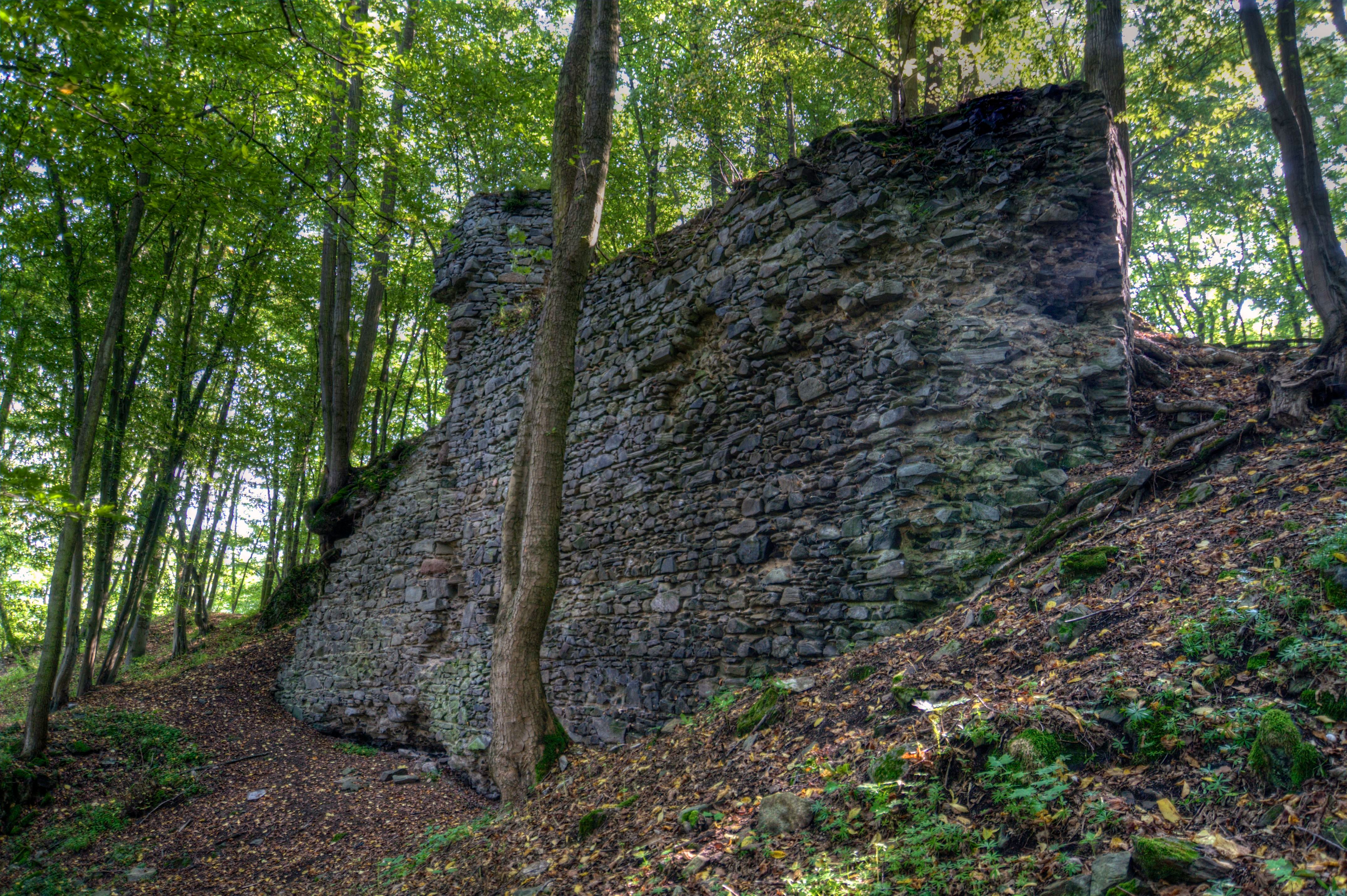
Stará Dubá Castle

The only important historical landmark in the municipality is the ruin of the Dubá Castle (today called Stará Dubá Castle), located near Doubravice 1.díl. It was an important medieval castle, built in the 13th century. In 1404, the castle was conquered and left in poor condition. Only a few fragments of the castle have survived, but they testify to its economic, defensive and residential function. Next to the castle was the market town of Odranec, which also disappeared and only a fragment of the walls and a watchtower have survived to this day.

The main landmark of the village of Přestavlky u Čerčan is a chapel dating from 1899.
