= Hluboká (Chrudim District) =

- Municipality
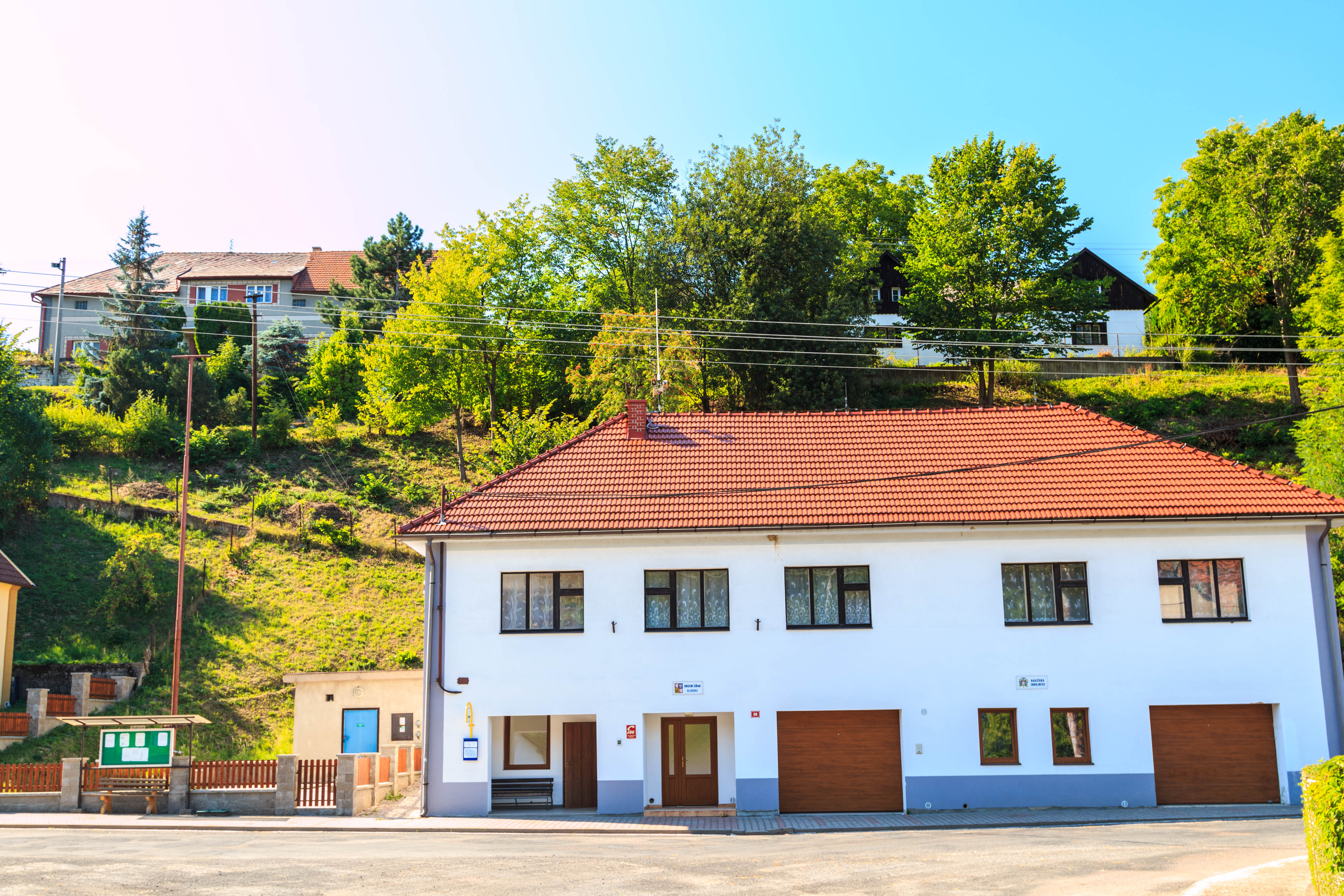
- Municipal office

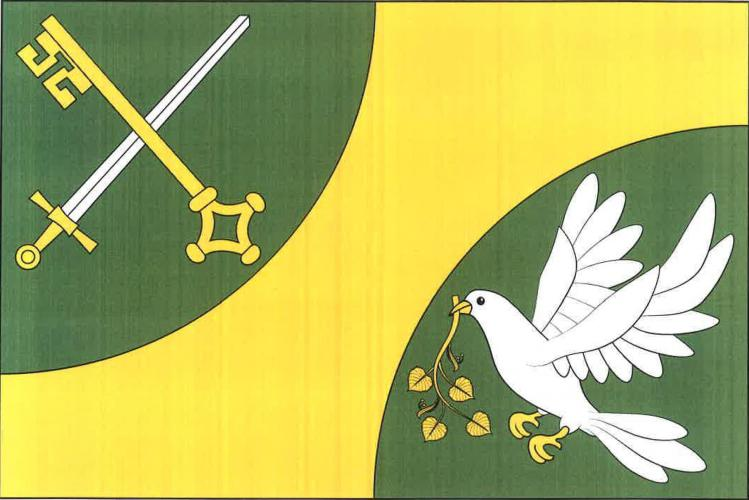
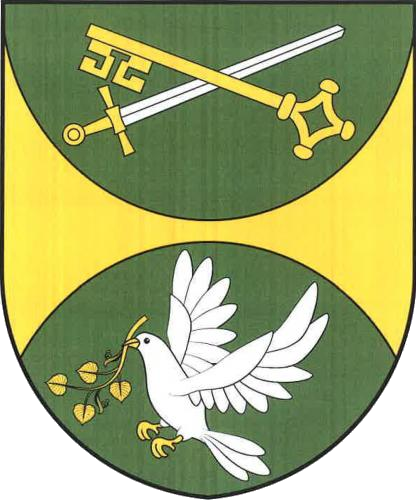
- Flag Coat of arms

- Location in the Czech Republic
- Coordinates: 49°50′44″N 16°4′18″E
- Country: Czech Republic
- Region: Pardubice
- District: Chrudim
- First mentioned: 1418

Area
  - Total: 7.33 km^{2} (2.83 sq mi)
- Elevation: 437 m (1,434 ft)

Population (2026-01-01)
  - Total: 189
  - Density: 25.8/km^{2} (66.8/sq mi)
- Time zone: UTC+1 (CET)
  - Summer (DST): UTC+2 (CEST)
- Postal code: 539 73
- Website: www.obechluboka.cz

Hluboká (Czech pronunciation: [ˈɦlubokaː]) is a municipality and village in Chrudim District in the Pardubice Region of the Czech Republic. It has about 200 inhabitants.

== Administrative division ==
Hluboká consists of four municipal parts (in brackets population according to the 2021 census):

- Hluboká (141)
- Chlum (18)
- Dolany (3)
- Střítež (15)

== Demographics ==
Historical population
Year	Pop.	±%
1869	733	—
1880	737	+0.5%
1890	688	−6.6%
1900	643	−6.5%
1910	664	+3.3%
1921	591	−11.0%
1930	574	−2.9%
1950	384	−33.1%
1961	435	+13.3%
1970	398	−8.5%
1980	324	−18.6%
1991	273	−15.7%
2001	225	−17.6%
2011	194	−13.8%
2021	177	−8.8%
Source: Censuses
