= Nalžovice =

- Municipality
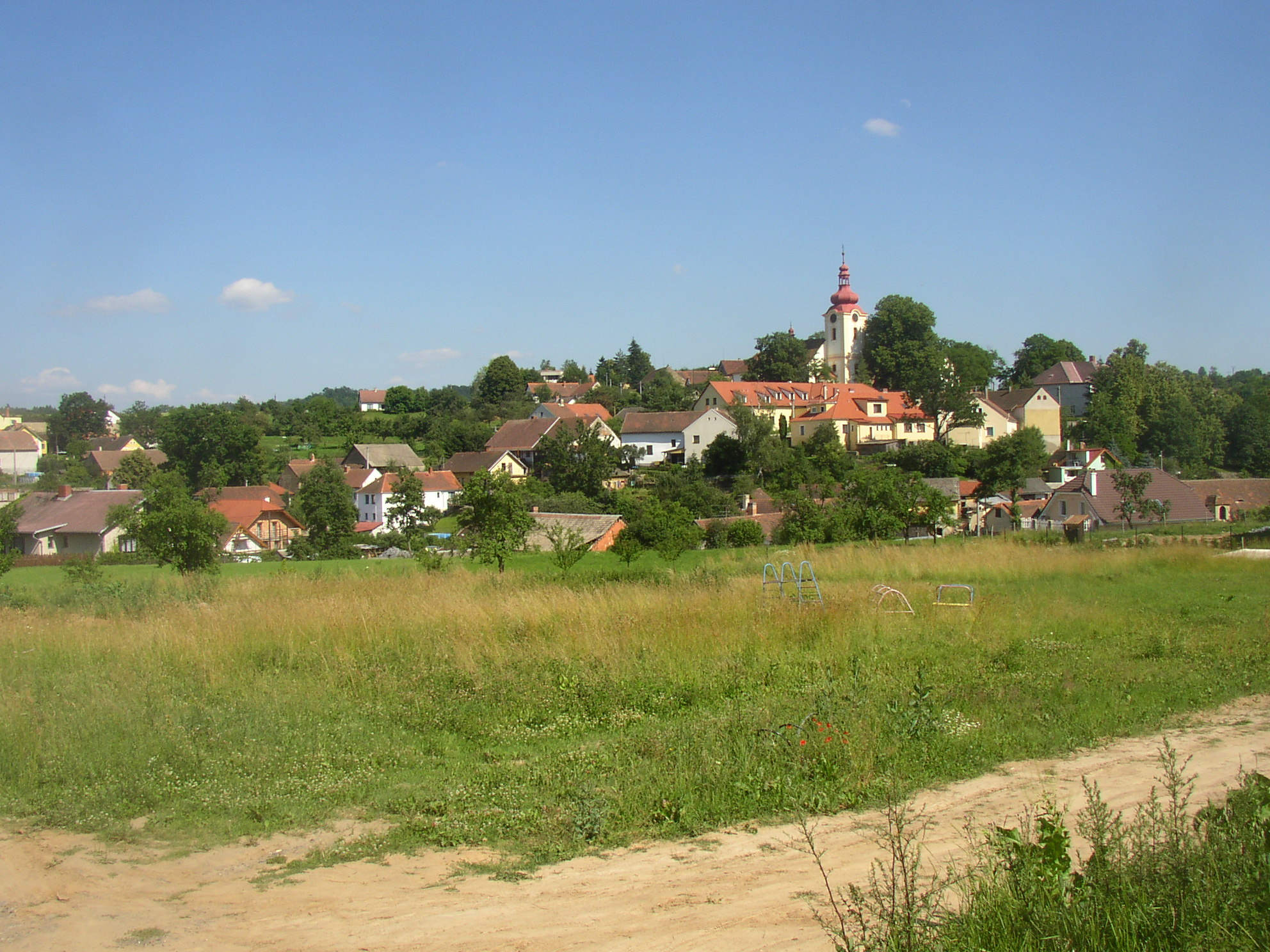
- Chlum, a part of Nalžovice

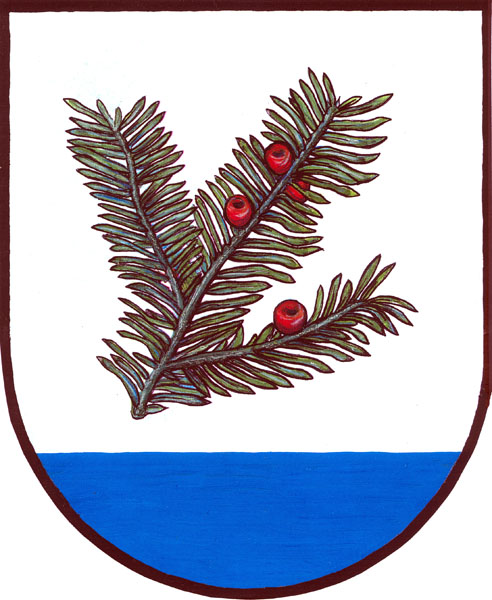
- Flag Coat of arms

- Location in the Czech Republic
- Coordinates: 49°41′55″N 14°22′15″E
- Country: Czech Republic
- Region: Central Bohemian
- District: Příbram
- First mentioned: 1364

Area
  - Total: 15.63 km^{2} (6.03 sq mi)
- Elevation: 340 m (1,120 ft)

Population (2026-01-01)
  - Total: 628
  - Density: 40.2/km^{2} (104/sq mi)
- Time zone: UTC+1 (CET)
  - Summer (DST): UTC+2 (CEST)
- Postal code: 262 93, 264 01
- Website: www.nalzovice.cz

Nalžovice is a municipality and village in Příbram District in the Central Bohemian Region of the Czech Republic. It has about 600 inhabitants.

== Administrative division ==
Nalžovice consists of six municipal parts (in brackets population according to the 2021 census):

- Nalžovice (122)
- Chlum (370)
- Hluboká (0)
- Nalžovické Podhájí (47)
- Nová Ves (42)
- Oboz (11)

== Etymology ==
The initial name of the village was Nelžovice, meaning "the village of people who do not lie" (from nelhat, i.e. 'not lie'). The name of the village was probably meant ironically and was based on some event.

== Geography ==
Nalžovice is located about 25 kilometres (16 mi) east of Příbram and 35 km (22 mi) south of Prague. It lies in the Benešov Uplands. The highest point is the hill Drbákov at 490 m (1,610 ft) above sea level. The area is rich in fishponds. In the north, the municipal border is formed by the Slapy Reservoir, built on the Vltava River.

== History ==
The first written mention of Nalžovice is from 1364.

== Demographics ==
Historical population

Year	Pop.	±%
1869	1,043	—
1880	1,031	−1.2%
1890	926	−10.2%
1900	853	−7.9%
1910	867	+1.6%

Year	Pop.	±%
1921	835	−3.7%
1930	766	−8.3%
1950	538	−29.8%
1961	589	+9.5%
1970	562	−4.6%

Year	Pop.	±%
1980	488	−13.2%
1991	537	+10.0%
2001	524	−2.4%
2011	565	+7.8%
2021	592	+4.8%

Source: Censuses

== Transport ==
There are no railways or major roads passing through the municipality.

== Sights ==
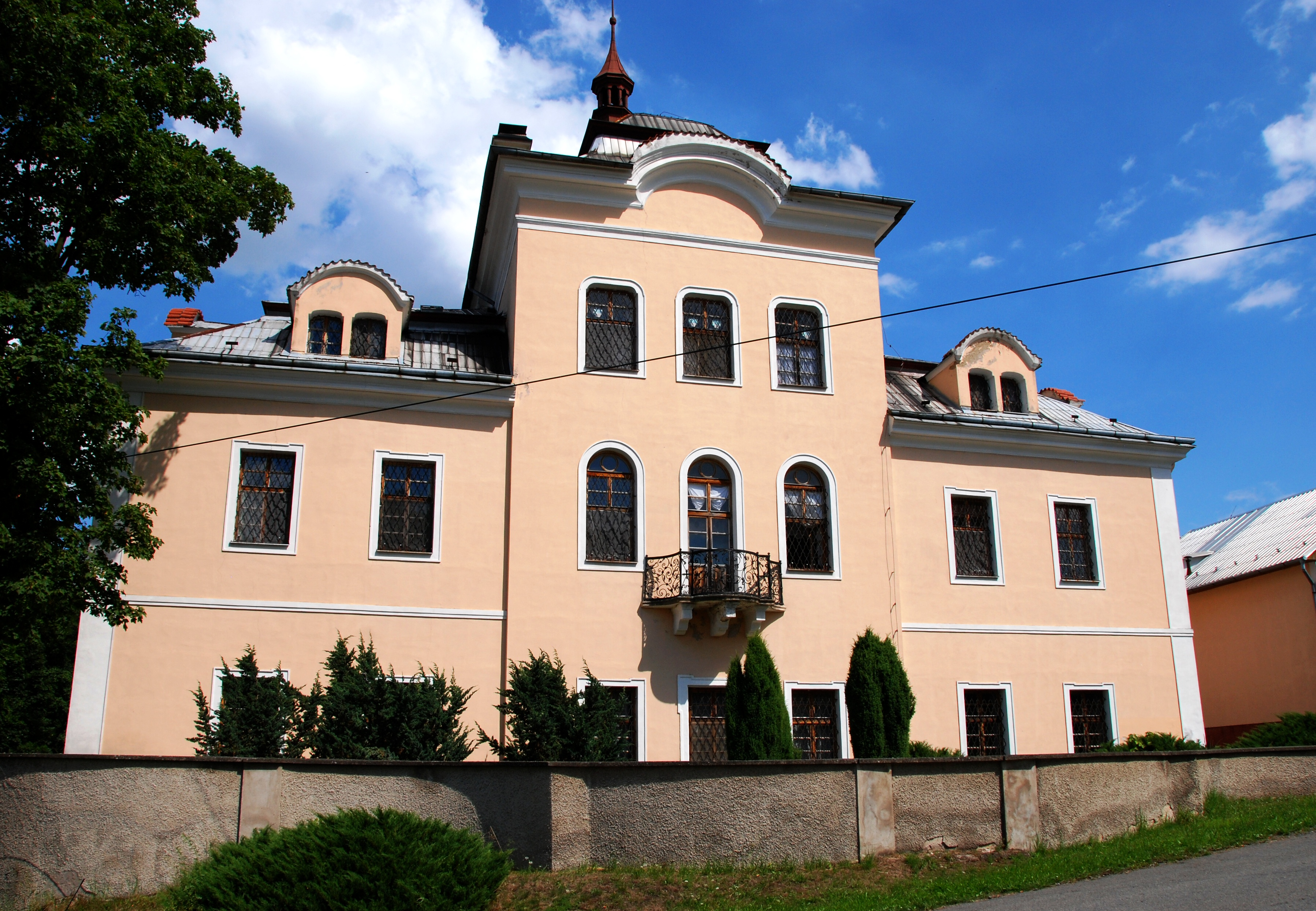
Nalžovice Castle

The main landmark of Nalžovice is the Nalžovice Castle. The early Baroque castle was gradually modified and extended in the 18th and 19th centuries. Today it serves as a home for disabled children.

The most important monument is the Church of Saint Wenceslaus in Chlum. It is originally a Gothic church from the 14th century, rebuilt in the Baroque style in 1790.
