= Sophomore surge =

A sophomore surge (sometimes referred to in the United Kingdom as first-term incumbency bonus) is a term used in the political science of the United States Congress that refers to an increase in votes that congressional candidates (candidates for the House of Representatives) usually receive when running for their first re-election. The phrase has been adopted in Australia by psephologist Malcolm Mackerras who is well known for his electoral pendulums.

== History ==
This phenomenon first started in the 1960s. As of 1998, freshman candidates running for a second term now get eight to ten percent more votes than when they were elected for their first term. (Over ninety percent of all incumbent House members are reelected.) Senate members also currently benefit from a sophomore surge, though it is to a lesser degree.

The reason for the sophomore surge is attributed to the fact that congressmen have figured out how to run personal campaigns rather than party campaigns. They use their free, or “franked,” mail; frequent home trips; radio and television broadcasts; and service distribution to their districts to create a good opinion of themselves, not their party, among their constituents.
