= Novohradka =

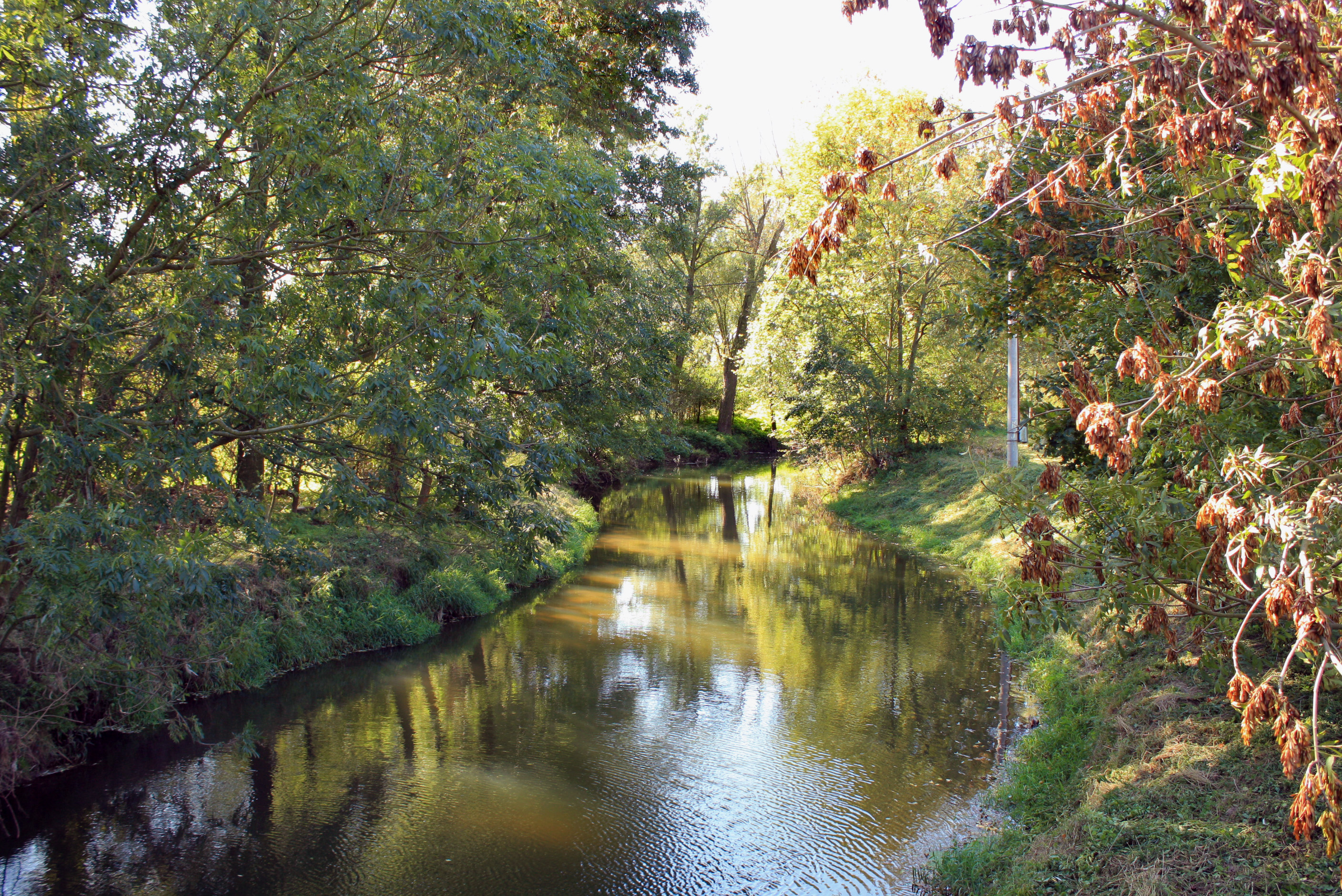
- The Novohradka near Dvakačovice

Location
- Country: Czech Republic
- Region: Pardubice

Physical characteristics
- Source
  - location: Úhřetice, Upper Svratka Highlands
  - coordinates: 49°46′41″N 16°8′16″E
  - elevation: 649 m (2,129 ft)
- Mouth
  - location: Chrudimka
  - coordinates: 49°59′19″N 15°51′48″E
  - elevation: 230 m (755 ft)
- Length: 49.2 km (30.6 mi)
- Basin size: 470.0 km^{2} (181.5 sq mi)
- Discharge
  - average: 2.52 m^{3}/s (89 cu ft/s) near estuary

Basin features
- Progression: Chrudimka→ Elbe→ North Sea

The Novohradka (Czech pronunciation: [ˈnovoɦratka]) is a river in the Czech Republic, a right tributary of the Chrudimka River. It flows through the Pardubice Region. It is 49.2 km (30.6 mi) long.

== Etymology ==
The river is named after the village of Nové Hrady.

== Characteristic ==
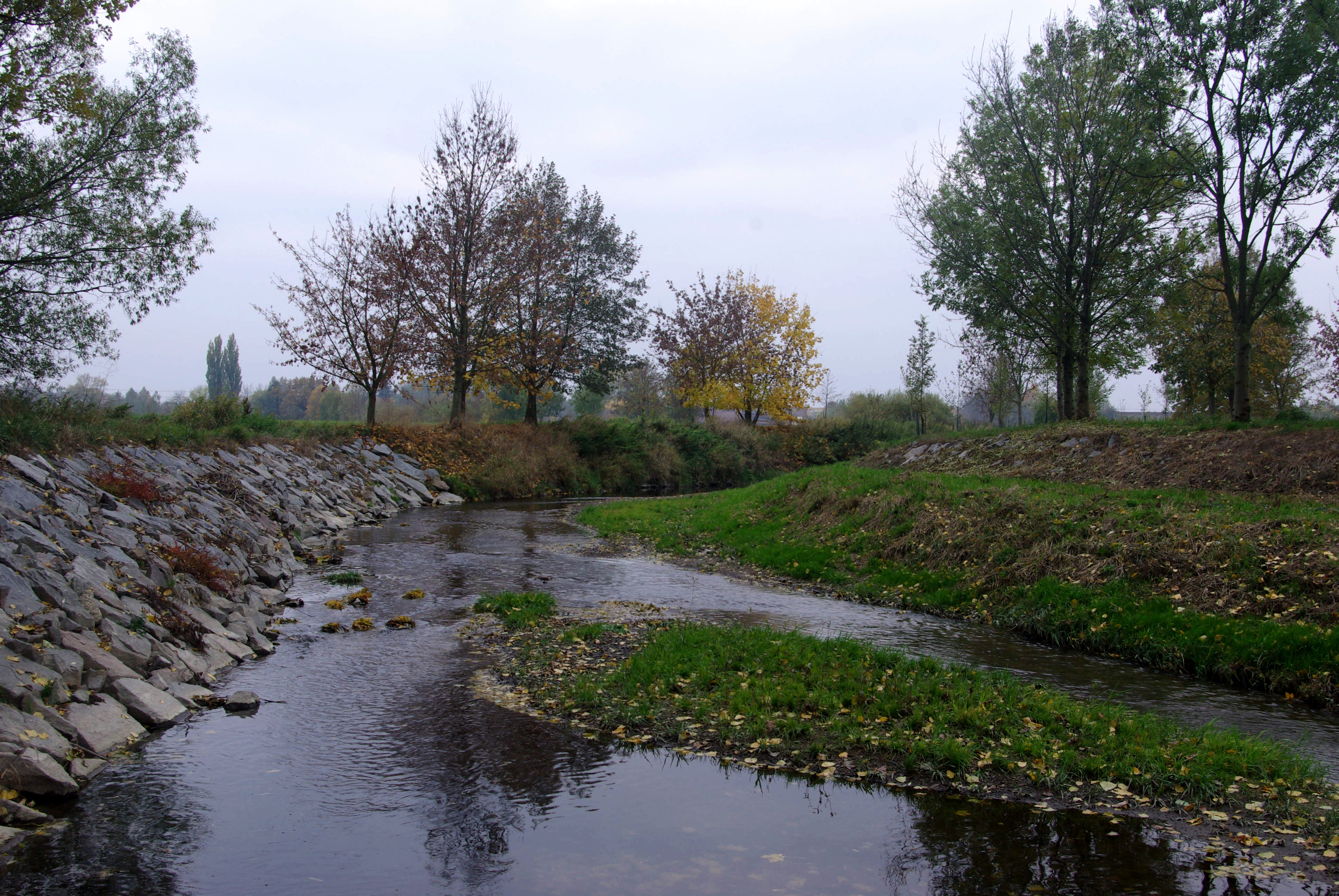
Lower course of the Novohradka

The Novohradka originates in the territory of Proseč in the Upper Svratka Highlands at an elevation of 649 m (2,129 ft) and flows to Úhřetice, where it enters the Chrudimka River at an elevation of 230 m (755 ft). It is 49.2 km (30.6 mi) long. Its drainage basin has an area of 470.0 km^{2} (181.5 sq mi). The average discharge at its mouth is 2.52 m3/s.

The longest tributaries of the Novohradka are:

Tributary	Length (km)	River km	Side
Ležák	31.0	7.2	left
Žejbro	30.8	10.0	left
Krounka	24.0	29.9	left
Anenský potok	11.8	24.3	left
Prosečský potok	10.1	38.6	left

== Course ==
The river flows through the municipal territories of Proseč, Bor u Skutče, Jarošov, Nová Ves u Jarošova, Nové Hrady, Zderaz, Leština, Hluboká, Střemošice, Luže, Lozice, Jenišovice, Chroustovice, Hrochův Týnec, Dvakačovice, Vejvanovice, Úhřetická Lhota and Úhřetice.

== Bodies of water ==
There are 597 bodies of water in the basin area. The largest of them is the fishpond Horecký rybník with and area of 31.6 ha (78 acres), supplied by the Žejbro. There are no fishponds or reservoirs built directly on the Novohradka.

== Nature ==
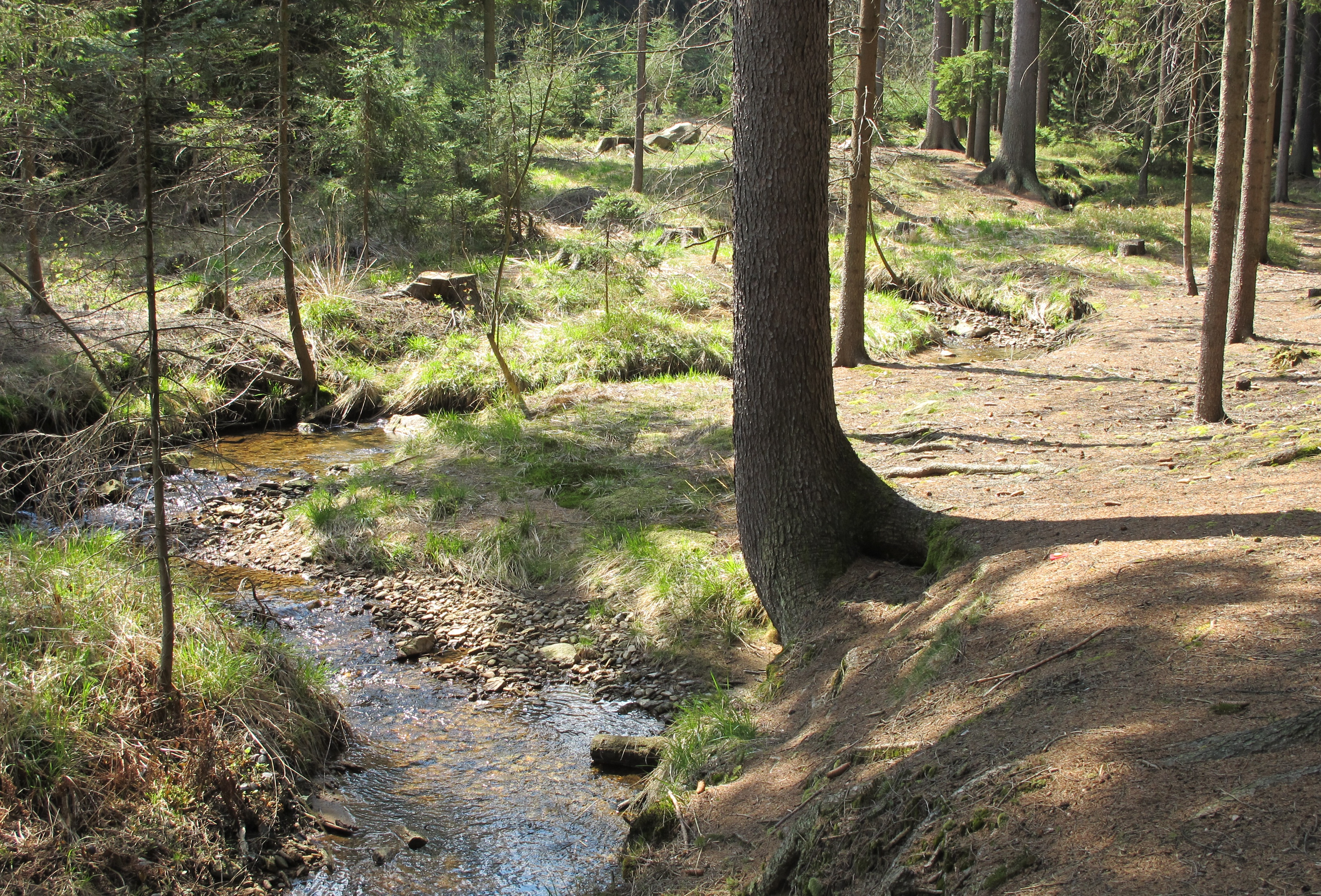
Upper course of the Novohradka in the Maštale Nature Reserve

According to a research made in the years 2015–2017, 15 species of aquatic molluscs were found in the Novohradka: 7 species of gastropods and 8 species of bivalves. The endangered species of bivalve Unio crassus occurs in the river, although it is not abundant.

The upper course of the river flows through the Maštale Nature Reserve. It has an area of 1,080.5 ha (2,670 acres) and the main object of protection are pine forests and rock formations with a predominance of Cenomanian sandstones. The following course of the river forms a valley protected as the Údolí Krounky a Novohradky Nature Park. The area is characterized by riparian vegetation along the river, scattered greenery, waterlogged meadows and adjacent woodlands. Occurring here are protected species of animals and plants, e.g. fire salamander, northern crested newt and common kingfisher.
