= Jarošov =

Jarošov may refer to places in the Czech Republic:

- Jarošov (Svitavy District), a municipality and village in the Pardubice Region
- Jarošov nad Nežárkou, a municipality and village in the South Bohemian Region
- Jarošov, a village and part of Uhelná Příbram in the Vysočina Region
- Jarošov, a village and part of Uherské Hradiště in the Zlín Region
