= Proseč =

- Town
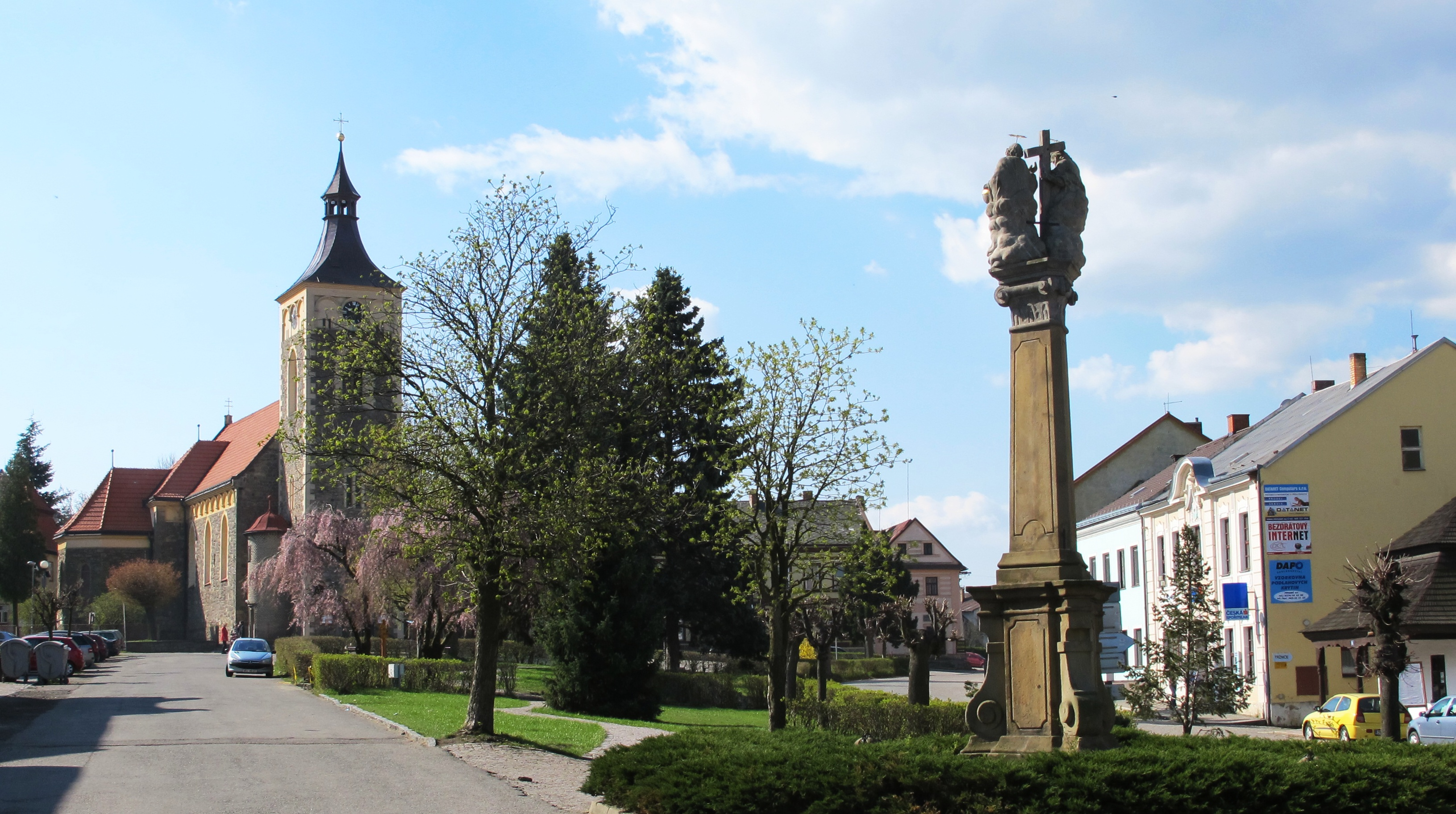
- Town square with Church of Saint Nicholas

- Flag Coat of arms

- Location in the Czech Republic
- Coordinates: 49°48′21″N 16°6′59″E
- Country: Czech Republic
- Region: Pardubice
- District: Chrudim
- First mentioned: 1349

Government
  - Mayor: Jan Macháček

Area
  - Total: 34.03 km^{2} (13.14 sq mi)
- Elevation: 523 m (1,716 ft)

Population (2026-01-01)
  - Total: 2,143
  - Density: 62.97/km^{2} (163.1/sq mi)
- Time zone: UTC+1 (CET)
  - Summer (DST): UTC+2 (CEST)
- Postal code: 539 44
- Website: www.mestoprosec.cz

Proseč (Czech pronunciation: [ˈprosɛtʃ]) is a town in Chrudim District in the Pardubice Region of the Czech Republic. It has about 2,100 inhabitants.

== Administrative division ==
Proseč consists of seven municipal parts (in brackets population according to the 2021 census):

- Proseč (1,029)
- Česká Rybná (209)
- Martinice (45)
- Miřetín (88)
- Paseky (59)
- Podměstí (173)
- Záboří (389)

== Etymology ==
The name is derived from the Old Czech word proseč, meaning 'a path cut through'.

== Geography ==
Proseč is located about 18 kilometres (11 mi) southeast of Chrudim and 26 km (16 mi) southeast of Pardubice. The municipal territory lies on the border of three geomorphological regions: the southern part lies in the Upper Svratka Highlands, the western part lies in the Iron Mountains, and a small part in the northeast extends into the Svitavy Uplands. The highest point is a nameless hill at 706 m (2,316 ft) above sea level. The Novohradka River originates in the municipal territory and then flows through the woods in the eastern part of the municipal territory. There are several small fishponds in and around the town.

== History ==
The first written mention of Proseč is from 1349. The village was probably founded during the colonisation of the area by the Benedictine monastery in Podlažice in the second half of the 12th century. In 1368, Proseč was first referred to as a town. In 1421, during the Hussite Wars, the Hussites burned the Podlažice Monastery and probably the town too, but it was rebuilt.

After the burning of the monastery, Proseč became the property of the Hussite governors and then of noble families. Zdeněk Kostka of Postupice had built a castle in Nové Hrady in the 1460s, and Proseč became part of the Nové Hrady estate for several centuries. The greatest development of Proseč occurred in the first half of the 18th century. Proseč acquired various town privileges in 1719 and 1751. The first school was founded in 1721. In 1727, new town square with uniform wooden single-story houses was built.

The population made a living from agriculture. Potatoes, barley, oats and flax were grown here. At the beginning of the 19th century, the first road, connection Proseč with Nové Hrady, was built. In the 19th century, crafts and trades developed in Proseč, and a glass factory was founded, which operated in the years 1828–1883. At the beginning of the 20th century, the town was industrialised. There were several tobacco pipe factories, which made the town famous at the time. However, most of the factories ceased to exist after World War II.

== Demographics ==
Historical population

Year	Pop.	±%
1869	4,084	—
1880	4,103	+0.5%
1890	3,869	−5.7%
1900	3,926	+1.5%
1910	3,872	−1.4%

Year	Pop.	±%
1921	3,742	−3.4%
1930	3,613	−3.4%
1950	2,560	−29.1%
1961	2,563	+0.1%
1970	2,361	−7.9%

Year	Pop.	±%
1980	2,314	−2.0%
1991	2,126	−8.1%
2001	2,098	−1.3%
2011	2,083	−0.7%
2021	1,992	−4.4%

Source: Censuses

== Economy ==
The only industrial factory for the production of tobacco pipes in the Czech Republic is located in Proseč.

== Transport ==
There are no railways or major roads passing through the municipal territory.

== Sights ==
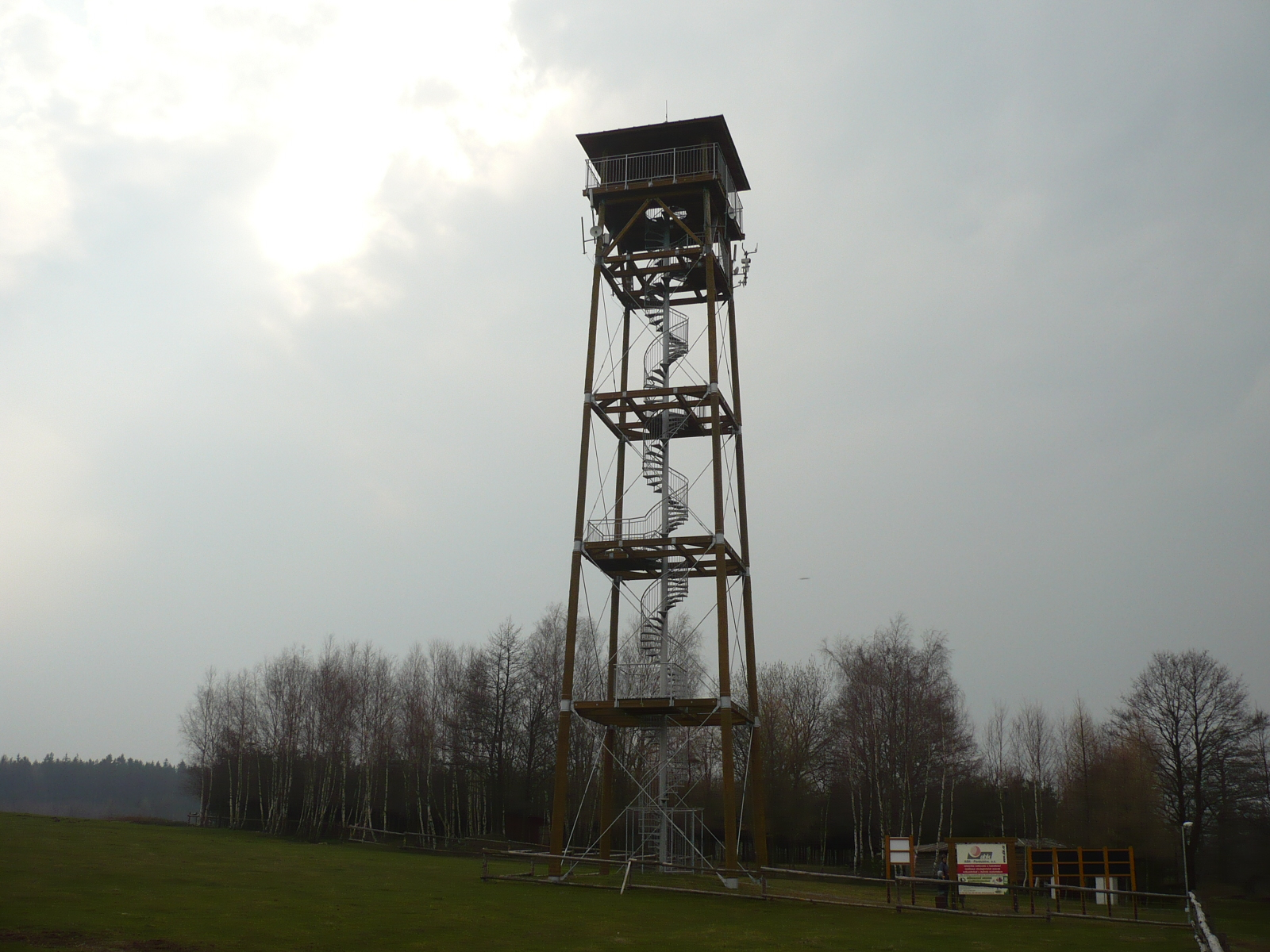
Terezka observation tower

The main landmark is the Church of Saint Nicholas. The old church, first documented in the mid-14th century, had insufficient capacity, and therefore was replaced by the current church, built in the neo-Gothic style in 1912–1913. The interior of the church is painted with monumental drawings according to the designs of Mikoláš Aleš.

The Evangelical church was built in the Empire style in 1834–1838.

The house No. 61 is the only original wooden house on the town square, which survived a fire in the mid-19th century. Today this cultural monument houses Teréza Nováková Memorial Hall and Museum of Tobacco Pipes.

In the village of Paseky is an observation tower called Terezka. It is a 28 m (92 ft) high wooden and steel tower. The second observation tower called U Marešů is located in Martinice. It is 13 m (43 ft) high.

== Notable people ==
- Teréza Nováková (1853–1912), writer; lived here in 1903–1912
