= Lozice (Chrudim District) =

- Municipality
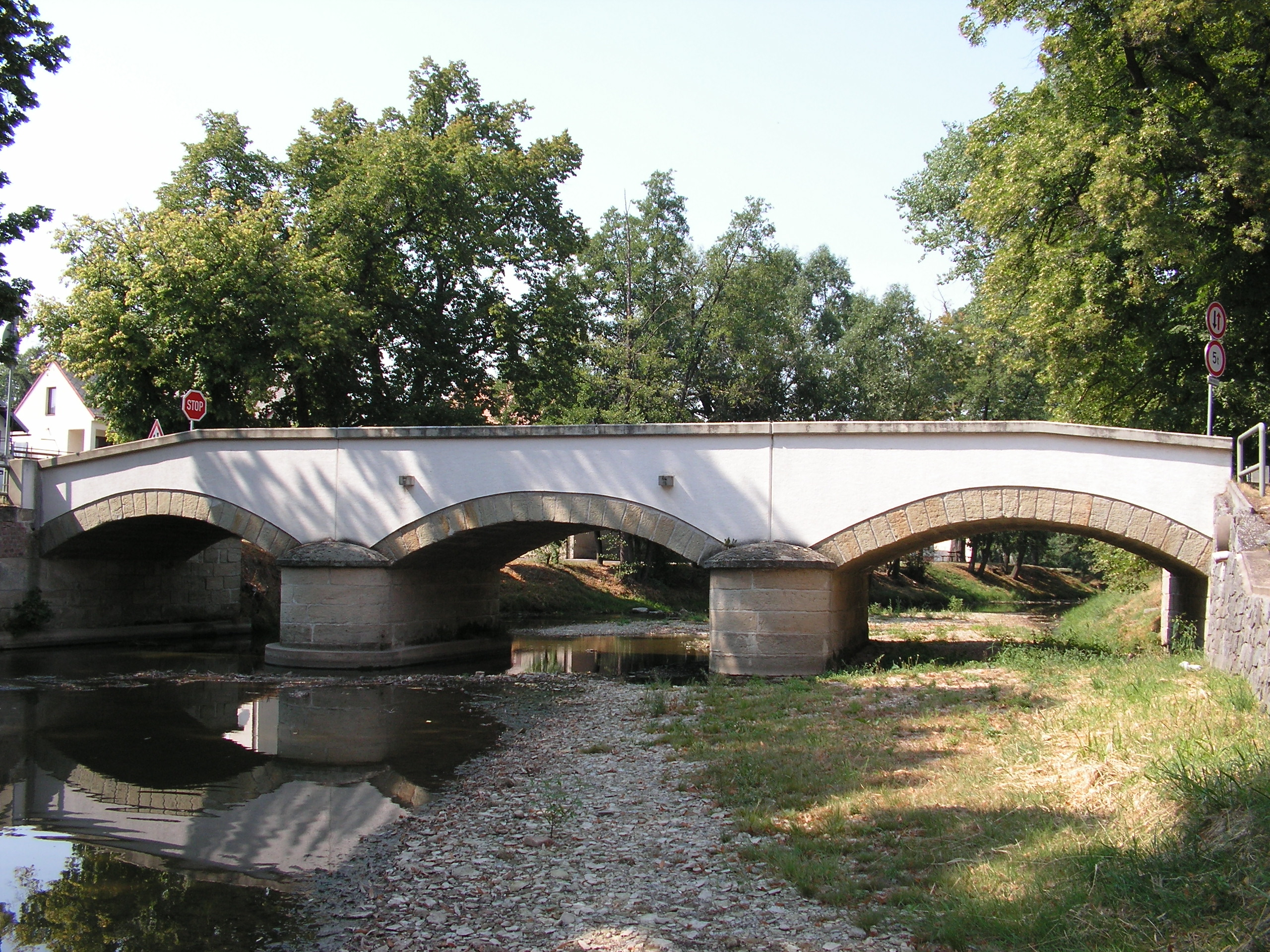
- Stone bridge over the Novohradka River

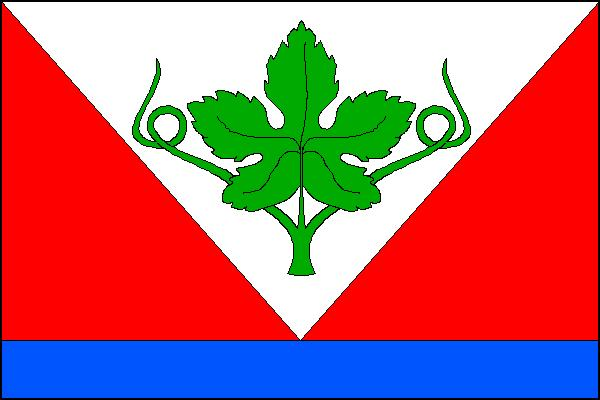
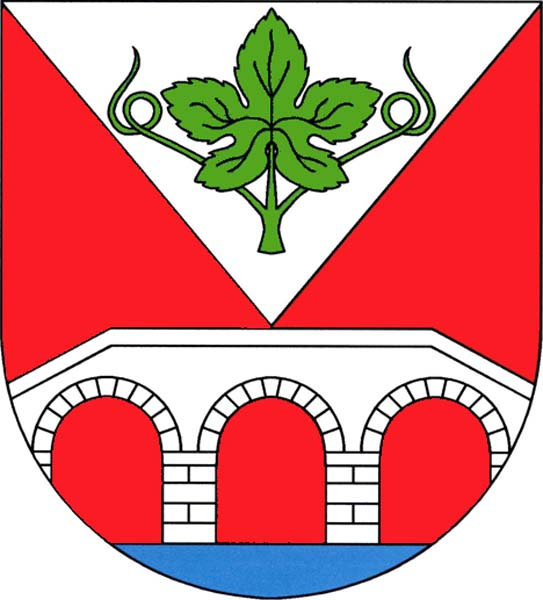
- Flag Coat of arms

- Location in the Czech Republic
- Coordinates: 49°54′59″N 16°1′26″E
- Country: Czech Republic
- Region: Pardubice
- District: Chrudim
- First mentioned: 1131

Area
  - Total: 3.68 km^{2} (1.42 sq mi)
- Elevation: 281 m (922 ft)

Population (2026-01-01)
  - Total: 171
  - Density: 46.5/km^{2} (120/sq mi)
- Time zone: UTC+1 (CET)
  - Summer (DST): UTC+2 (CEST)
- Postal code: 538 54
- Website: www.lozice.cz

Lozice is a municipality and village in Chrudim District in the Pardubice Region of the Czech Republic. It has about 200 inhabitants.

== History ==
The first written mention of Lozice is from 1131.

== Demographics ==
Historical population
Year	Pop.	±%
1869	368	—
1880	379	+3.0%
1890	407	+7.4%
1900	387	−4.9%
1910	362	−6.5%
1921	330	−8.8%
1930	346	+4.8%
1950	259	−25.1%
1961	225	−13.1%
1970	198	−12.0%
1980	152	−23.2%
1991	155	+2.0%
2001	153	−1.3%
2011	145	−5.2%
2021	152	+4.8%
Source: Censuses
