= František Klapálek =

Czech entomologist (1863–1919)

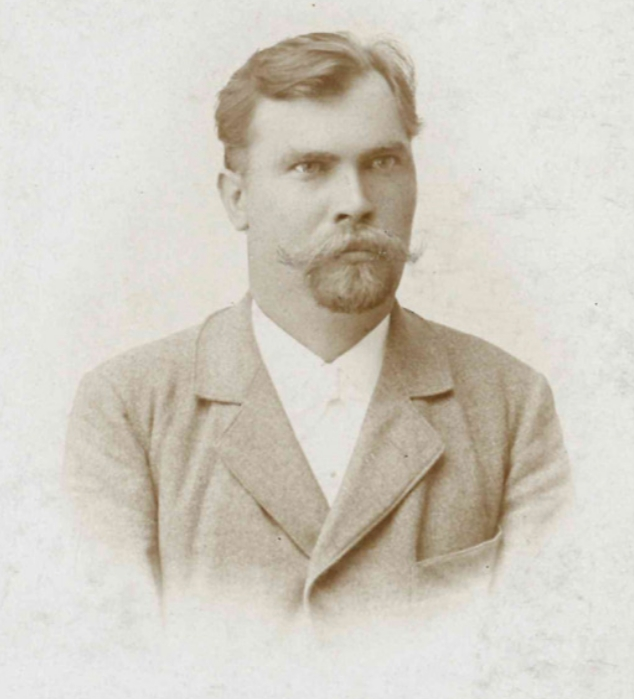
Klapálek in 1897

František Klapálek (30 or 31 August 1863 – 3 February 1919) was a Czech entomologist. He was particularly interested in the mayflies and other freshwater insect fauna. He was also the first to translate the works of Charles Darwin and Jean-Henri Fabre into Czech. He also published a two-volume "Atlas of Central European Beetles". In 1904 he founded the Czech Society of Entomology (ČSE) and its journal.

== Biography ==
Klapálek was born in the village of Luže, Bohemia, Austria-Hungary and was educated at the Litomyšl gymnasium (1873–1881). He was introduced to natural history by Emanuel Bárta and Bohumil Fleischer (brother of Antonín Fleischer). He then went to study at the Czech Charles University of Prague with support from his uncle Jan Klapálek, a judge in Libochovice. Here he studied under Antonín Frič and became a zoological assistant at the Royal Czech Museum in Prague. After graduating in 1887 he taught at secondary schools in Litomyšl (1887–1888), and later at Prague in Žitná and Spálená Street. Still later he move to a school in Karlín where he was able to spend more time on entomological pursuits. He made trips to Austria, Bulgaria, Bosnia and Herzegovina, making collections of insects.

His special area was in insects associated with freshwater particularly in the groups Trichoptera, Plecoptera, and Neuroptera. He also took some interest in ladybird beetles. In 1903 he published a two-volume atlas of central European beetles. He was one of the founding members of the Czech Entomological Society on 17 January 1904, and was elected the first chairman of the organization. He was elected as the first chairman and other members who helped were Ferdinand Veselý (1839–1914), business school owner Napoleon Manuel Kheil (1849–1923), naturalist Emanuel Rádl (1873–1942), Hynek Alois Joukl (1862–1910) and Josef Černý (1854–1930). He translated two books by Jean Henri Fabre into Czech published in 1911 and 1916. In 1914 he published a Czech translation of Darwin's On the Origin of Species.

Klapálek died on 3 February 1919 in Prague, at the age of 55.
