= Hrochův Týnec =

Town in the Czech Republic

- Town
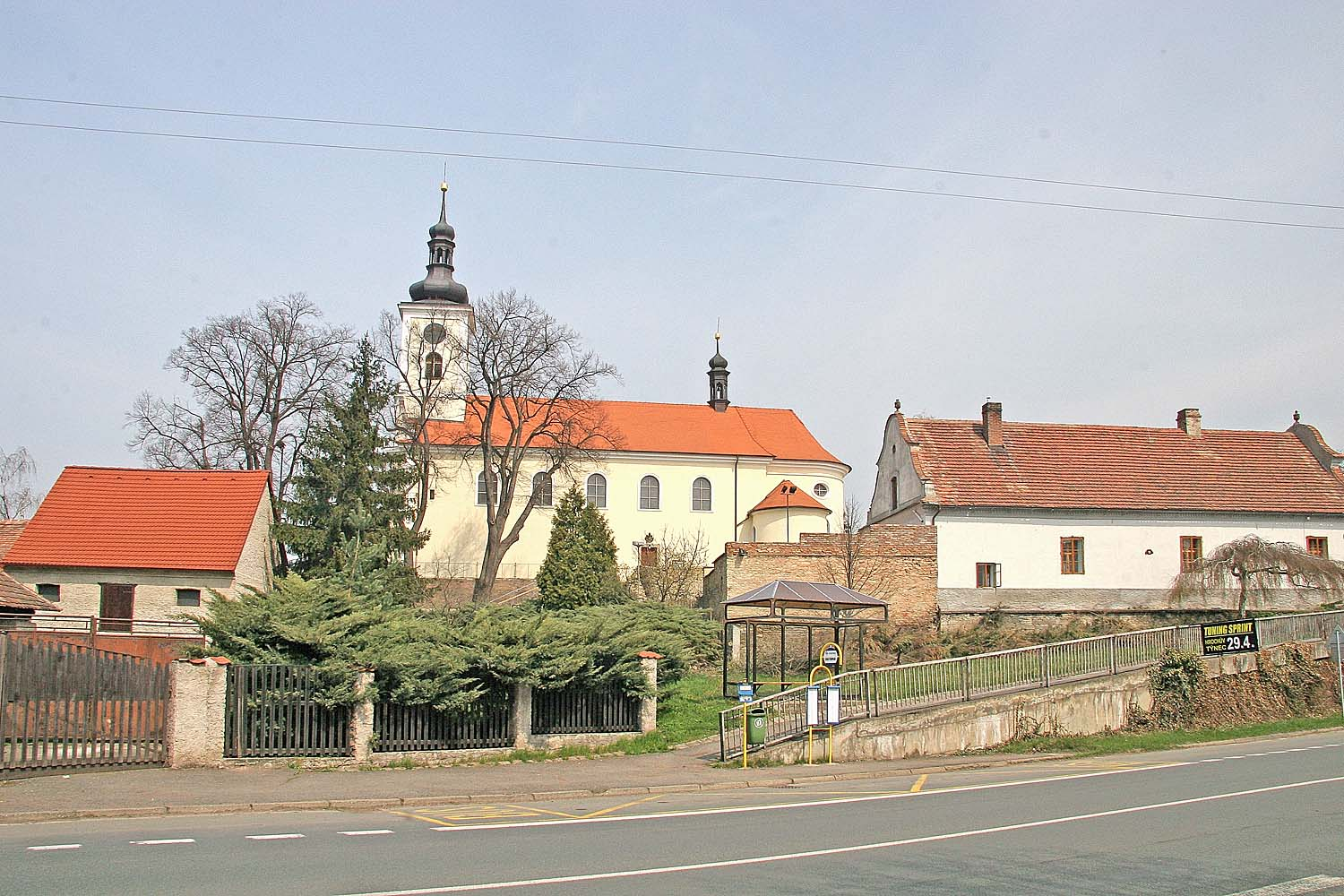
- Church of Saint Martin

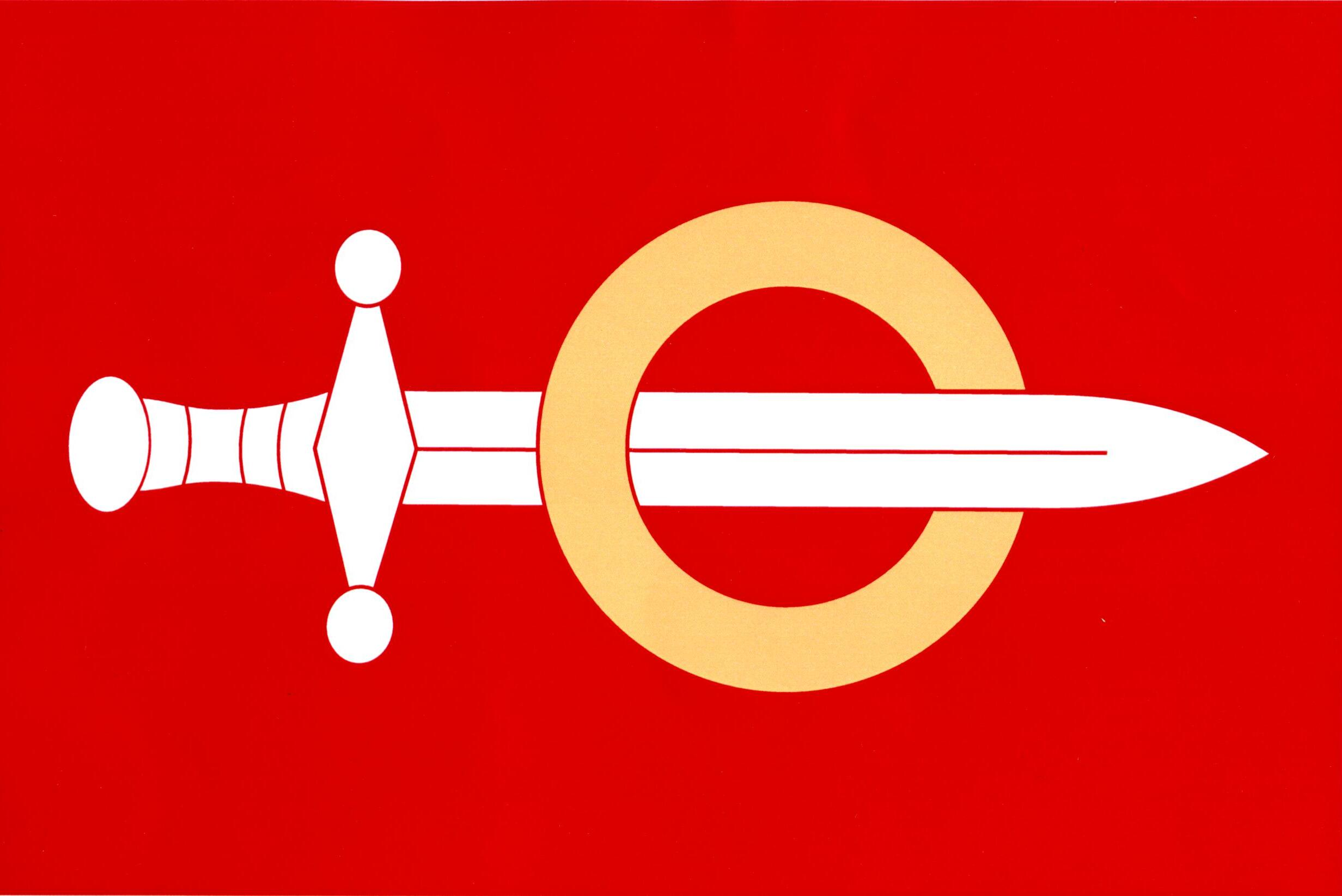
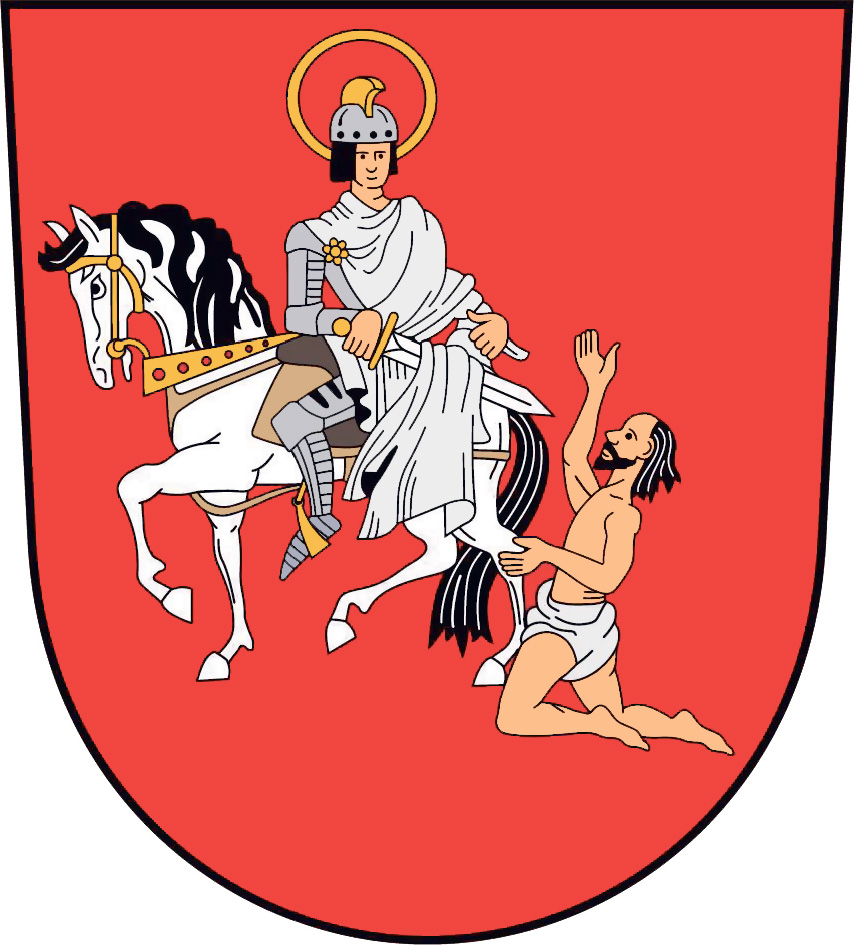
- Flag Coat of arms

- Location in the Czech Republic
- Coordinates: 49°57′34″N 15°54′38″E
- Country: Czech Republic
- Region: Pardubice
- District: Chrudim
- First mentioned: 1293

Government
  - Mayor: Aleš Vašek

Area
  - Total: 12.51 km^{2} (4.83 sq mi)
- Elevation: 241 m (791 ft)

Population (2026-01-01)
  - Total: 2,187
  - Density: 174.8/km^{2} (452.8/sq mi)
- Time zone: UTC+1 (CET)
  - Summer (DST): UTC+2 (CEST)
- Postal code: 538 62
- Website: www.hrochuvtynec.cz

Hrochův Týnec (Czech pronunciation: [ˈɦroxuːf ˈtiːnɛts]) is a town in Chrudim District in the Pardubice Region of the Czech Republic. It has about 2,200 inhabitants. The town is located in the Svitavy Uplands on the Novohradka River. The main landmark of the town is the Hrochův Týnec Castle.

== Administrative division ==
Hrochův Týnec consists of five municipal parts (in brackets population according to the 2021 census):

- Hrochův Týnec (1,580)
- Blansko (29)
- Blížňovice (75)
- Skalice (21)
- Stíčany (268)

== Etymology ==
The initial name of the settlement was Týnec. Týnec is a diminutive of the Old Czech word týn (related to English 'town'), meaning 'fortified settlement'. In the 15th century, it was renamed to Hrochův Týnec ("Hroch's Týnec"), after the then-owner of the settlement.

== Geography ==
Hrochův Týnec is located about 8 kilometres (5 mi) east of Chrudim and 12 km (7 mi) southeast of Pardubice. It lies in the Svitavy Uplands. The highest point is at 270 m (890 ft) above sea level. The town is situated at the confluence of the Novohradka River and Ležák Stream.

== History ==
A settlement named Týnec was first mentioned in 1194, but it is not possible to prove that it is Hrochův Týnec. The first trustworthy written mention of Hrochův Týnec is from 1293. It was then a property of the Hroch of Mezilezy family. In 1544, the village was promoted to a market town by Ferdinand II. In 1854, Hrochův Týnec became a town.

== Demographics ==
Historical population

Year	Pop.	±%
1869	1,743	—
1880	1,927	+10.6%
1890	1,957	+1.6%
1900	2,023	+3.4%
1910	2,053	+1.5%

Year	Pop.	±%
1921	2,060	+0.3%
1930	1,938	−5.9%
1950	1,806	−6.8%
1961	1,818	+0.7%
1970	1,963	+8.0%

Year	Pop.	±%
1980	2,168	+10.4%
1991	1,966	−9.3%
2001	1,874	−4.7%
2011	1,945	+3.8%
2021	1,973	+1.4%

Source: Censuses

== Transport ==
The I/17 road, which connects Chrudim with the D35 motorway, runs through the town.

Hrochův Týnec is located on the railway line Chrudim–Moravany.

== Sights ==
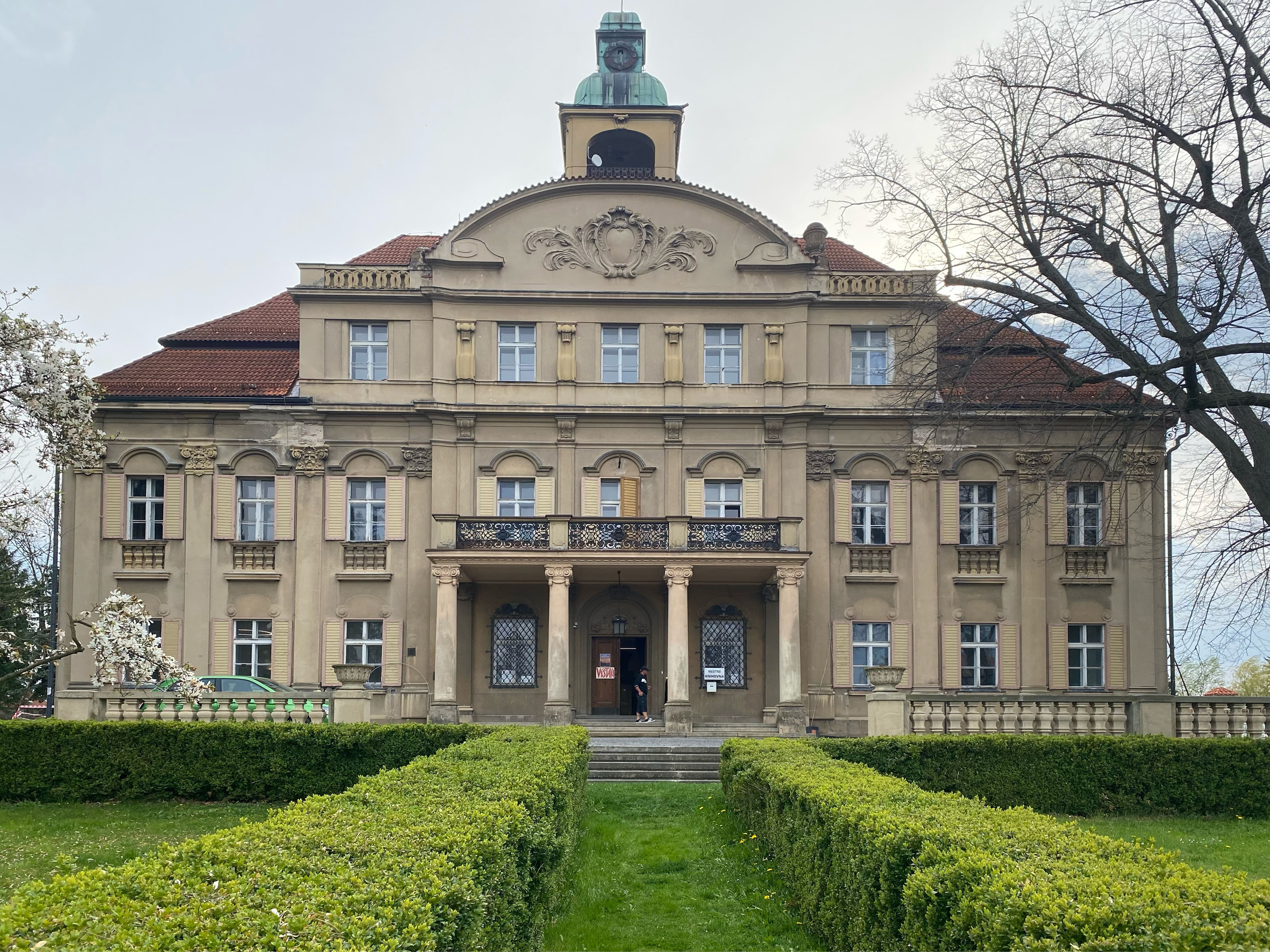
Hrochův Týnec Castle

Hrochův Týnec Castle was built at the end of the 17th century and rebuilt in 1717. It is a valuable Baroque complex with a castle garden.

The main landmark of the town centre is the Church of Saint Martin. It was rebuilt to its present Baroque form in1723–1725.

== Notable people ==
- Friedrich Simony (1813–1896), Austrian geographer
- Otakar Slavík (1931–2010), Czech painter and draughtsman; spent childhood here
