= Teréza Nováková =

Czech author and feminist

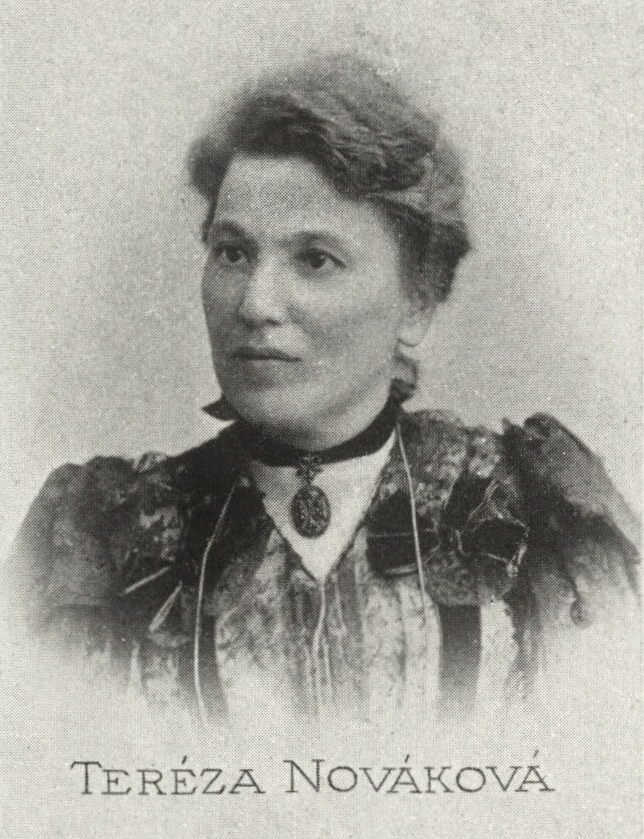
- Nováková in a 1899 book
- Born: 31 December 1853; Prague, Bohemia, Austrian Empire
- Died: 13 November 1912 (aged 57); Prague, Austria-Hungary
- Occupations: Author, feminist, editor, and ethnographer
- Children: Arne Novák (son)
- Writing career
- Pen name: 'Lona', 'Thea', and 'N.T. Fedorovič'
- Subject: Women's rights

Teréza Nováková (née Lanhausová; 31 December 1853 – 13 November 1912) was a Czech feminist author, editor, and ethnographer.

== Life ==
Teréza Nováková was born in Prague in the Austrian Empire (now the Czech Republic). She married a secondary school teacher, Josef Novák, and they had six children together. Novák got a job in Litomyšl, in eastern Bohemia, and Nováková became interested in the local folklore, influenced by the work of Karolína Světlá who she had worked with earlier in Prague. She also founded the Association of Ladies and Girls (Czech: Spolek paní a dívek) for the local middle-class women. Nováková loved the area and eventually bought a cottage there, although the death of her eldest daughter in 1895 caused her to return to Prague.

In 1903, Nováková bought a house in Proseč, where she wrote her most important works, including Drašar, Jiří Šmatlán, and Úlomky žuly. Her health began to decline in 1907. She died in Prague on 13 November 1912.

== Activities ==
Nováková began writing articles, short stories and novels while living in Litomyšl, the early ones depicting conventional middle-class life. By 1890, when she published A Small-Town Novel (Czech: Maloměstský román), "she turned to realism in an attempt to condemn what she thought of as the insular national idealization of Czech society." Nováková published the most ethnographic of her articles in the journal, Housewife (Czech: Domací hospodyně), with others going to Čeněk Zíbrt's journal, The Czech People (Czech: Český lid). Her early articles did not challenge conventional attitudes about women and their role in the family, but, by the early 1890s, she had "published two important studies of women’s social status. In the first, On J. S. Mill's The Subjection of Women (Czech: J. S. Millovo Poddanství žen), Nováková expounded on Mill’s concepts of freedom and responsibility with regard to women. In the second, L. N. Tolstoy's Kreutzer Sonata from a Feminine Perspective (Czech: L. N. Tolstojova Kreutzrova sonata ze stanoviska ženského), she reviewed the debates over double moral standards for men and women that had been generated by Tolstoy's controversial work."
