= Luže (Chrudim District) =

- Town
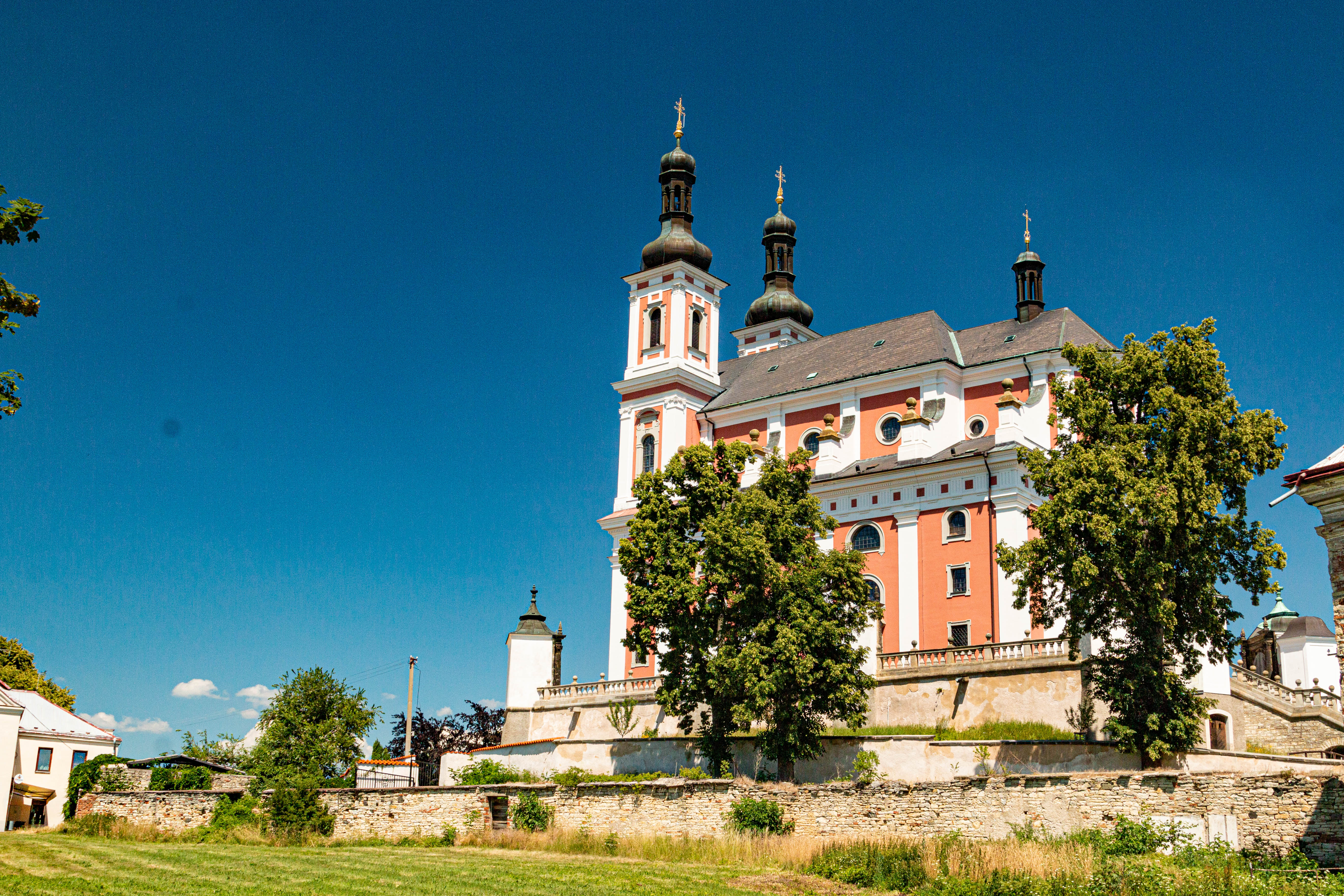
- Church of Our Lady Help of Christians

- Flag Coat of arms

- Location in the Czech Republic
- Coordinates: 49°53′36″N 16°1′43″E
- Country: Czech Republic
- Region: Pardubice
- District: Chrudim
- First mentioned: 1349

Government
  - Mayor: Ladislav Peterka

Area
  - Total: 30.71 km^{2} (11.86 sq mi)
- Elevation: 309 m (1,014 ft)

Population (2026-01-01)
  - Total: 2,589
  - Density: 84.30/km^{2} (218.3/sq mi)
- Time zone: UTC+1 (CET)
  - Summer (DST): UTC+2 (CEST)
- Postal code: 538 54
- Website: www.luze.cz

Luže (Czech pronunciation: [ˈluʒɛ]) is a town in Chrudim District in the Pardubice Region of the Czech Republic. It has about 2,600 inhabitants. The town is located in the Svitavy Uplands on the Novohradka River.

The historic town centre is well preserved and is protected as an urban monument zone. The most important monument is the Church of Our Lady Help of Christians on the Chlumek hill, protected as a national cultural monument.

== Administrative division ==
Luže consists of 12 municipal parts (in brackets population according to the 2021 census):

- Luže (1,449)
- Bělá (228)
- Brdo (41)
- Dobrkov (88)
- Doly (75)
- Domanice (28)
- Košumberk (226)
- Rabouň (27)
- Radim (299)
- Srbce (66)
- Voletice (51)
- Zdislav (46)

== Etymology ==
The name is derived from the Old Czech word lúže (in modern Czech louže), meaning 'puddle'.

== Geography ==
Luže is located about 17 kilometres (11 mi) southeast of Chrudim and 23 km (14 mi) southeast of Pardubice. It lies in the Svitavy Uplands. The town is situated on the right bank of the Novohradka River. The Krounka Stream flows into the Novohradka in the southern part of the municipal territory. The fishpond Voletický rybník is located in the northern part.

== History ==
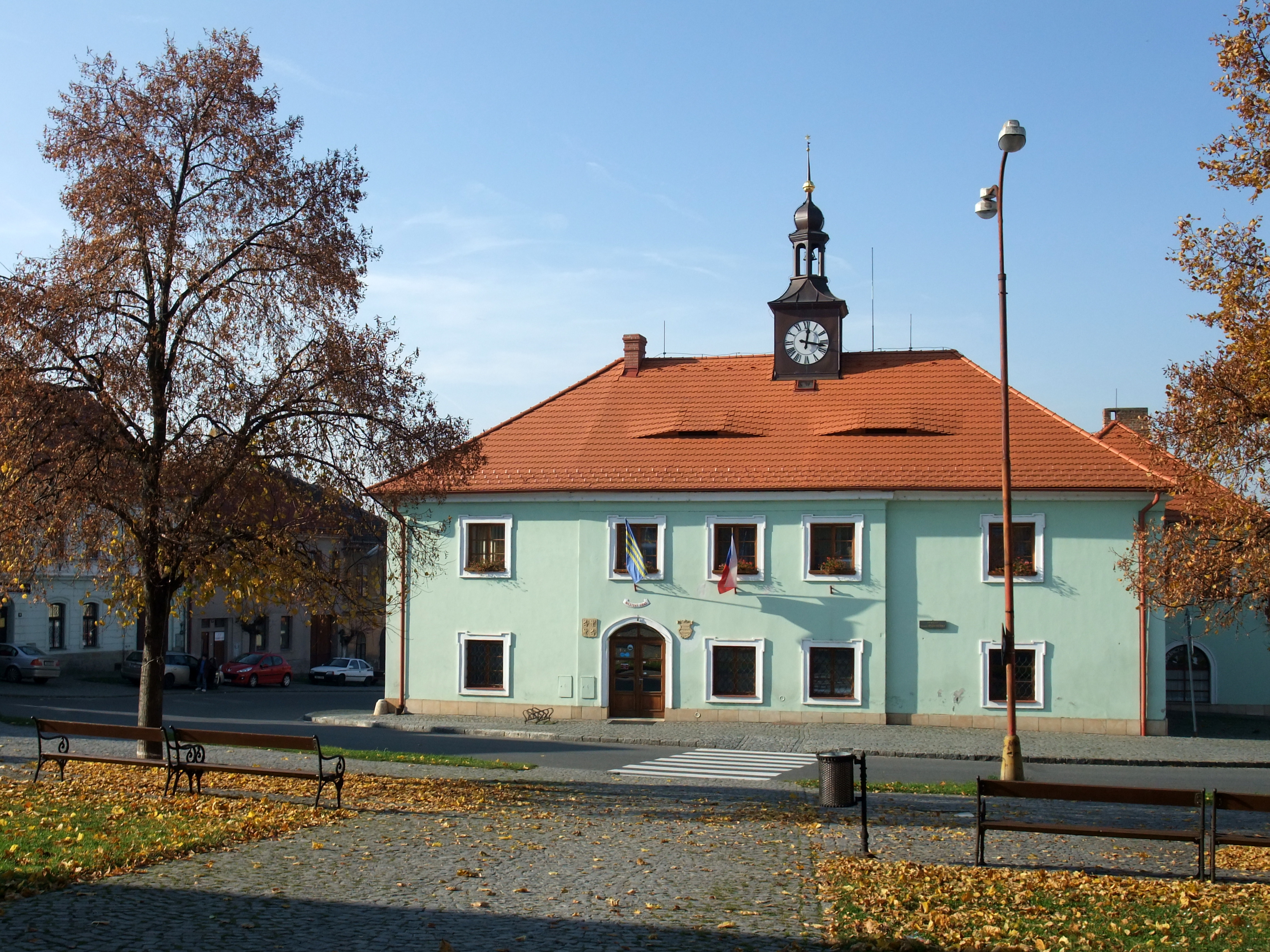
Town hall on the town square

The first indirect mention of Luže is from 1250, when an old settlement called Kamenicza joined with the newly established Luza. The first clear written mention of Luže is from 1349. A deed from 1372 referred to Luže as a market town.

The history of Luže is closely linked with the Košumberk Castle. From the 14th century, Luže was part of the estate of the Lords of Chlum and Košumberk, later known as Slavatas of Chlum and Košumberk. In the 15th century, Luže slowly developed and benefited from the fact that it was not affected by the Hussite Wars much. In 1690, after the Slavata family became extinct, the estate was donated to the Jesuits. Its last owner until World War I was the Thurn und Taxis family.

The Jewish community in Luže is documented from the second half of the 16th century. At its peak in the mid-19th century, it constituted 18% of the population. Already in 1930, it almost disappeared and after World War II, it was not renewed.

== Demographics ==
Historical population

Year	Pop.	±%
1869	3,853	—
1880	4,001	+3.8%
1890	3,922	−2.0%
1900	4,070	+3.8%
1910	4,280	+5.2%

Year	Pop.	±%
1921	4,528	+5.8%
1930	4,719	+4.2%
1950	3,830	−18.8%
1961	3,111	−18.8%
1970	3,003	−3.5%

Year	Pop.	±%
1980	2,816	−6.2%
1991	2,631	−6.6%
2001	2,612	−0.7%
2011	2,541	−2.7%
2021	2,624	+3.3%

Source: Censuses

== Economy ==
The Hamza Hospital is the main employer based in the town. In 1901, the Hamza Sanatorium was founded in Luže by František Hamza. It was the first sanatorium in Central Europe for children suffering from tuberculosis. The first buildings of the hospital complex were built in 1907. In 1962 the treatment of tuberculosis patients stopped and the hospital focused upon the rehabilitation of patients with mobility impairments. Since 1990, it treats both children and adult patients.

== Transport ==
There are no railways or major roads passing through the municipal territory.

== Sights ==
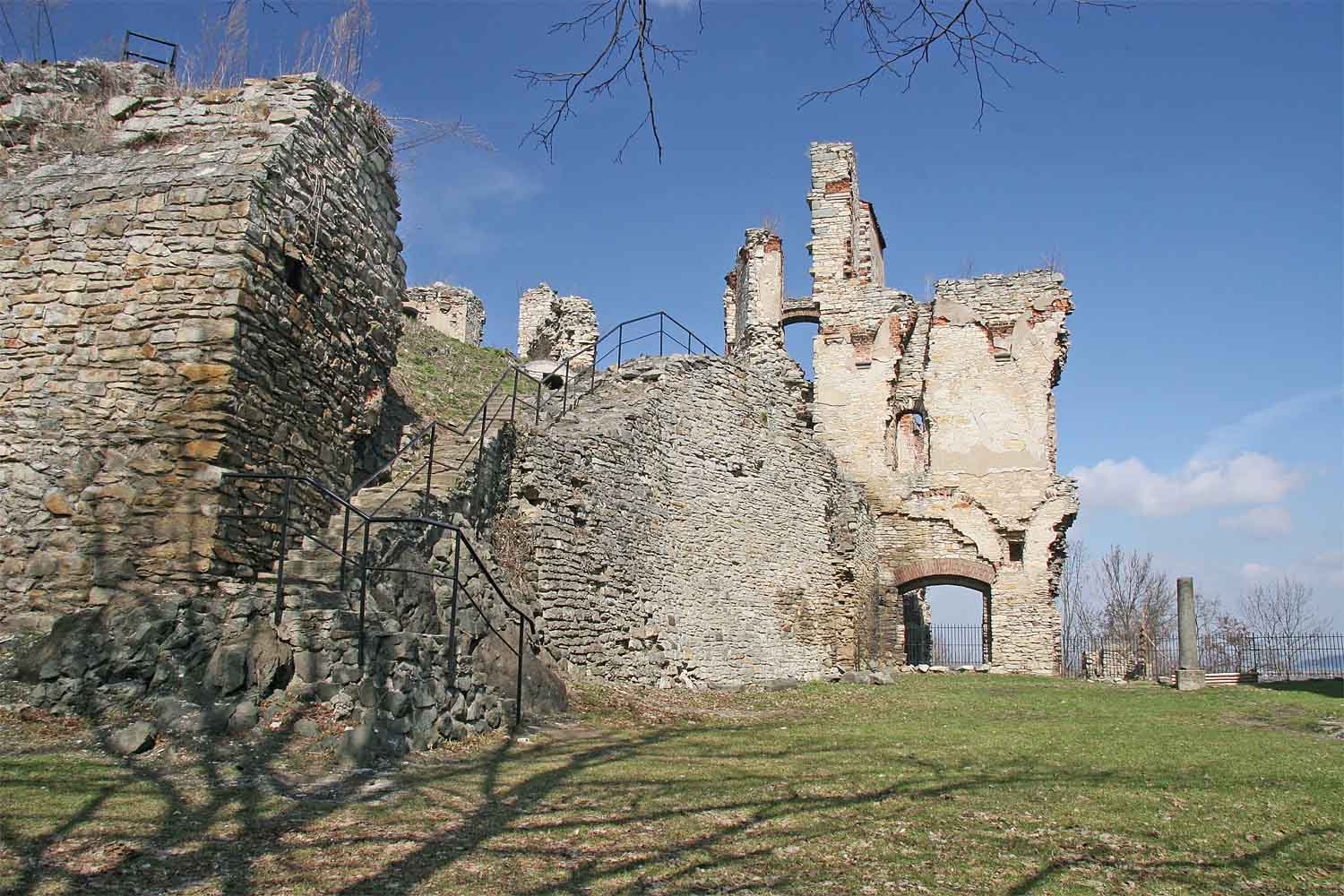
Košumberk Castle

Among the main tourist destinations is the ruin of the Košumberk Castle. Nowadays the ruin is a property of the town of Luže. In the castle is an exhibition on the history of the castle and the town.

The most valuable monument is the Church of Our Lady Help of Christians on the Chlumek hill, protected as a national cultural monument. This pilgrimage church was founded by Countess Mary Maximiliana Eva of Žďár. She had built the church at her own expense. It was built in the Baroque style in 1690–1695.

The Church of Saint Bartholomew was first mentioned in 1350. Despite an extensive reconstruction in the 19th century, some parts maintained the original Gothic style. Within the church, several tombstones are preserved, such as the tombstone of Diviš Slavata of Chlum and Košumberk.

The synagogue building from the 18th century has been renewed. The building is now owned by the Jewish community of Prague and serves cultural purposes. A large Jewish cemetery about 1 km north of Luže has tombs dating back to the 17th century.

== Notable people ==
- František Klapálek (1863–1919), entomologist
