= Dvakačovice =

- Municipality
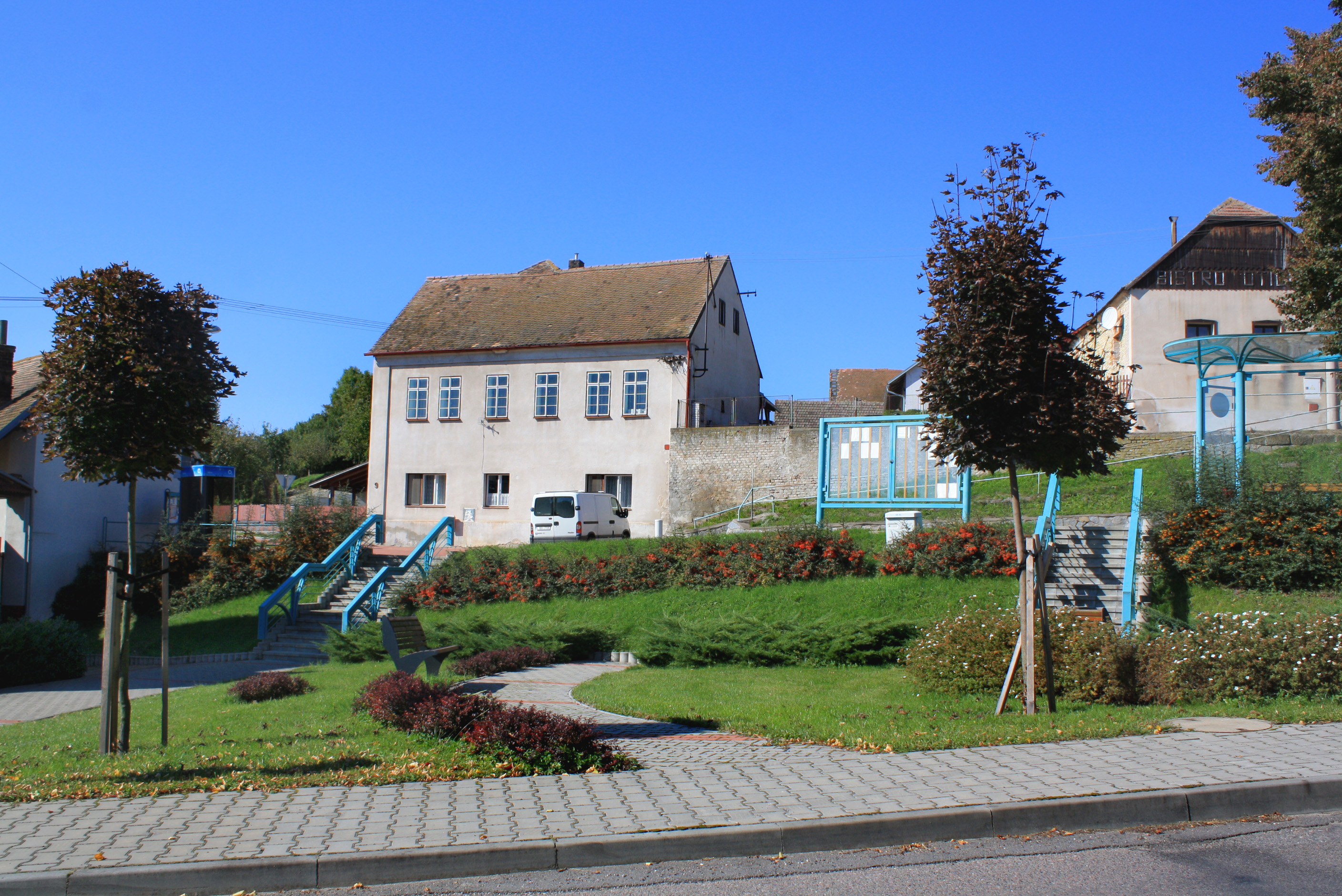
- Centre of Dvakačovice

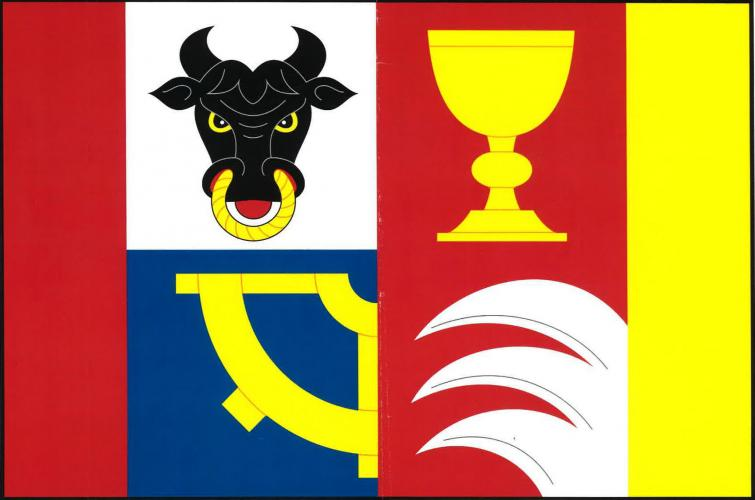
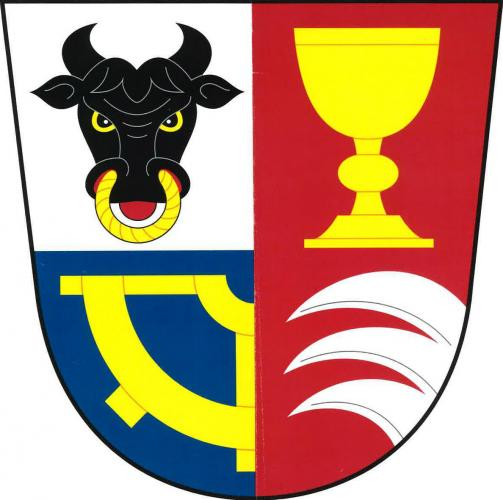
- Flag Coat of arms

- Location in the Czech Republic
- Coordinates: 49°58′44″N 15°53′40″E
- Country: Czech Republic
- Region: Pardubice
- District: Chrudim
- First mentioned: 1415

Area
  - Total: 3.63 km^{2} (1.40 sq mi)
- Elevation: 248 m (814 ft)

Population (2026-01-01)
  - Total: 139
  - Density: 38.3/km^{2} (99.2/sq mi)
- Time zone: UTC+1 (CET)
  - Summer (DST): UTC+2 (CEST)
- Postal code: 538 62
- Website: www.dvakacovice.cz

Dvakačovice is a municipality and village in Chrudim District in the Pardubice Region of the Czech Republic. It has about 100 inhabitants.

== Demographics ==
Historical population
Year	Pop.	±%
1869	362	—
1880	378	+4.4%
1890	390	+3.2%
1900	391	+0.3%
1910	411	+5.1%
1921	411	+0.0%
1930	399	−2.9%
1950	310	−22.3%
1961	312	+0.6%
1970	249	−20.2%
1980	177	−28.9%
1991	140	−20.9%
2001	142	+1.4%
2011	165	+16.2%
2021	162	−1.8%
Source: Censuses
