= Uhelná Příbram =

- Market town
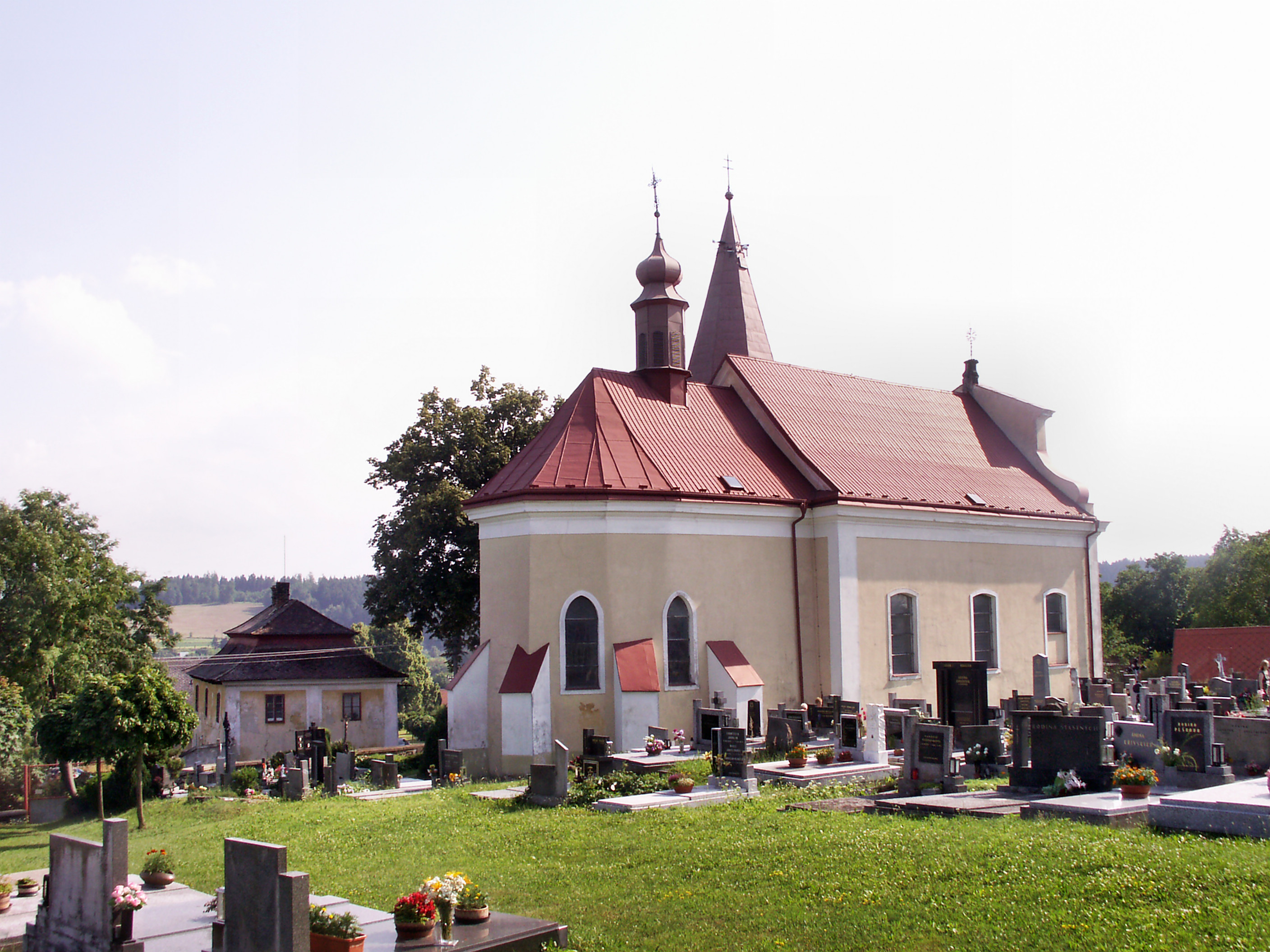
- Church of Saint Michael the Archangel

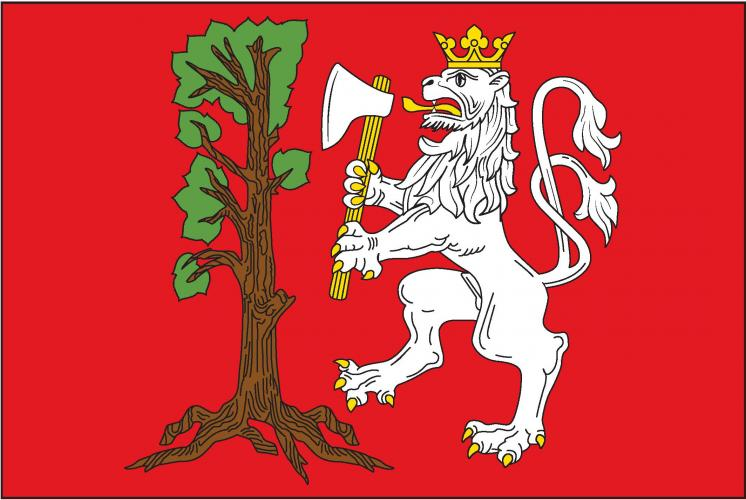
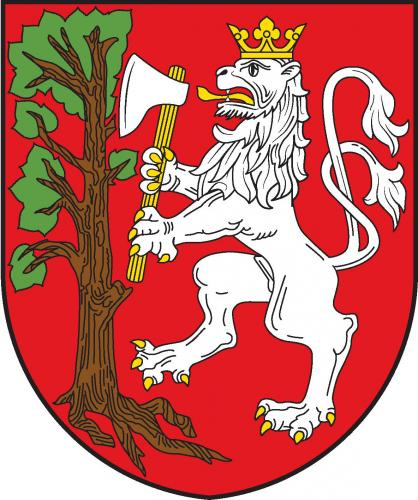
- Flag Coat of arms

- Location in the Czech Republic
- Coordinates: 49°46′5″N 15°35′8″E
- Country: Czech Republic
- Region: Vysočina
- District: Havlíčkův Brod
- First mentioned: 1355

Area
  - Total: 21.81 km^{2} (8.42 sq mi)
- Elevation: 485 m (1,591 ft)

Population (2026-01-01)
  - Total: 511
  - Density: 23.4/km^{2} (60.7/sq mi)
- Time zone: UTC+1 (CET)
  - Summer (DST): UTC+2 (CEST)
- Postal codes: 582 45, 582 82, 583 01
- Website: www.uhelnapribram.cz

Uhelná Příbram (Czech pronunciation: [ˈuɦɛlnaː ˈpr̝̊iːbram]; German: Kohl Pribrams) is a market town in Havlíčkův Brod District in the Vysočina Region of the Czech Republic. It has about 500 inhabitants.

== Administrative division ==
Uhelná Příbram consists of five municipal parts (in brackets population according to the 2021 census):

- Uhelná Příbram (320)
- Jarošov (32)
- Petrovice u Uhelné Příbramě (62)
- Přísečno (12)
- Pukšice (79)

== Etymology ==
The name Příbram is derived from the personal name Příbram, meaning "Příbram's (court)". The prefix uhelná (an adjective from uhlí, i.e. 'coal') refers to the livelihood of the local inhabitants.

== Geography ==
Uhelná Příbram is located about 17 kilometres (11 mi) north of Havlíčkův Brod and 32 km (20 mi) southwest of Pardubice. It lies in the Upper Sázava Hills. The highest point is the Kubík hill at 535 m (1,755 ft) above sea level. There are several streams originating in the municipal territory. The territory is rich in small fishponds supplied by these streams.

== History ==
The first written mention of Uhelná Příbram is from 1355. The area was historically home of charcoal burners. Until the 17th century, it was part of the Žleby estate.

== Demographics ==
Historical population

Year	Pop.	±%
1869	1,411	—
1880	1,405	−0.4%
1890	1,304	−7.2%
1900	1,165	−10.7%
1910	1,260	+8.2%

Year	Pop.	±%
1921	1,200	−4.8%
1930	1,078	−10.2%
1950	874	−18.9%
1961	860	−1.6%
1970	784	−8.8%

Year	Pop.	±%
1980	692	−11.7%
1991	613	−11.4%
2001	519	−15.3%
2011	473	−8.9%
2021	505	+6.8%

Source: Censuses

== Transport ==
There are no railways or major roads passing through the municipality.

== Sights ==
The main landmark of Uhelná Příbram is the Church of Saint Michael the Archangel. It was originally a Gothic church, rebuilt in the Baroque style in 1760. A valuable building is also the late Baroque rectory dating from 1762.
