= Bor u Skutče =

- Municipality
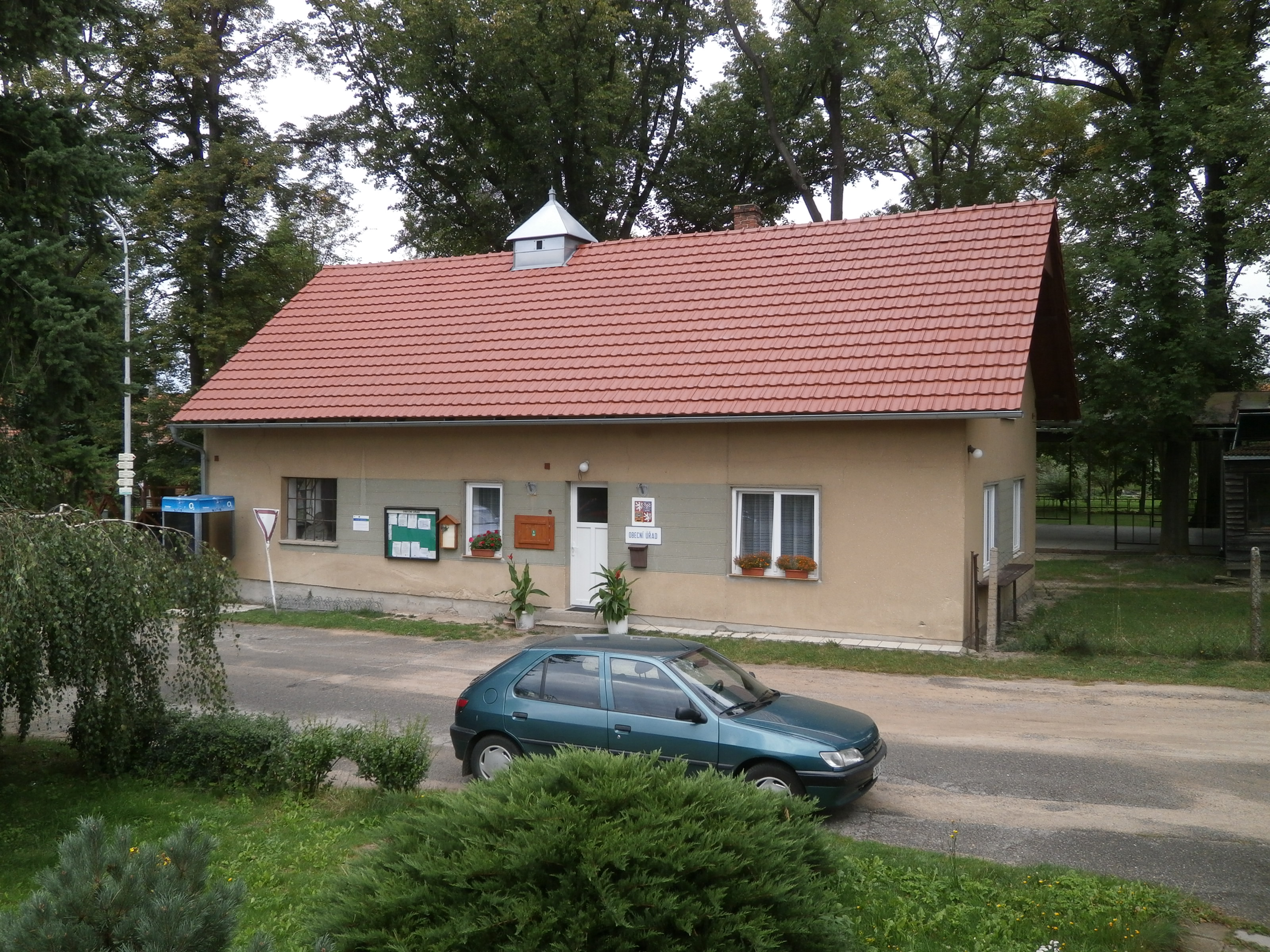
- Municipal office

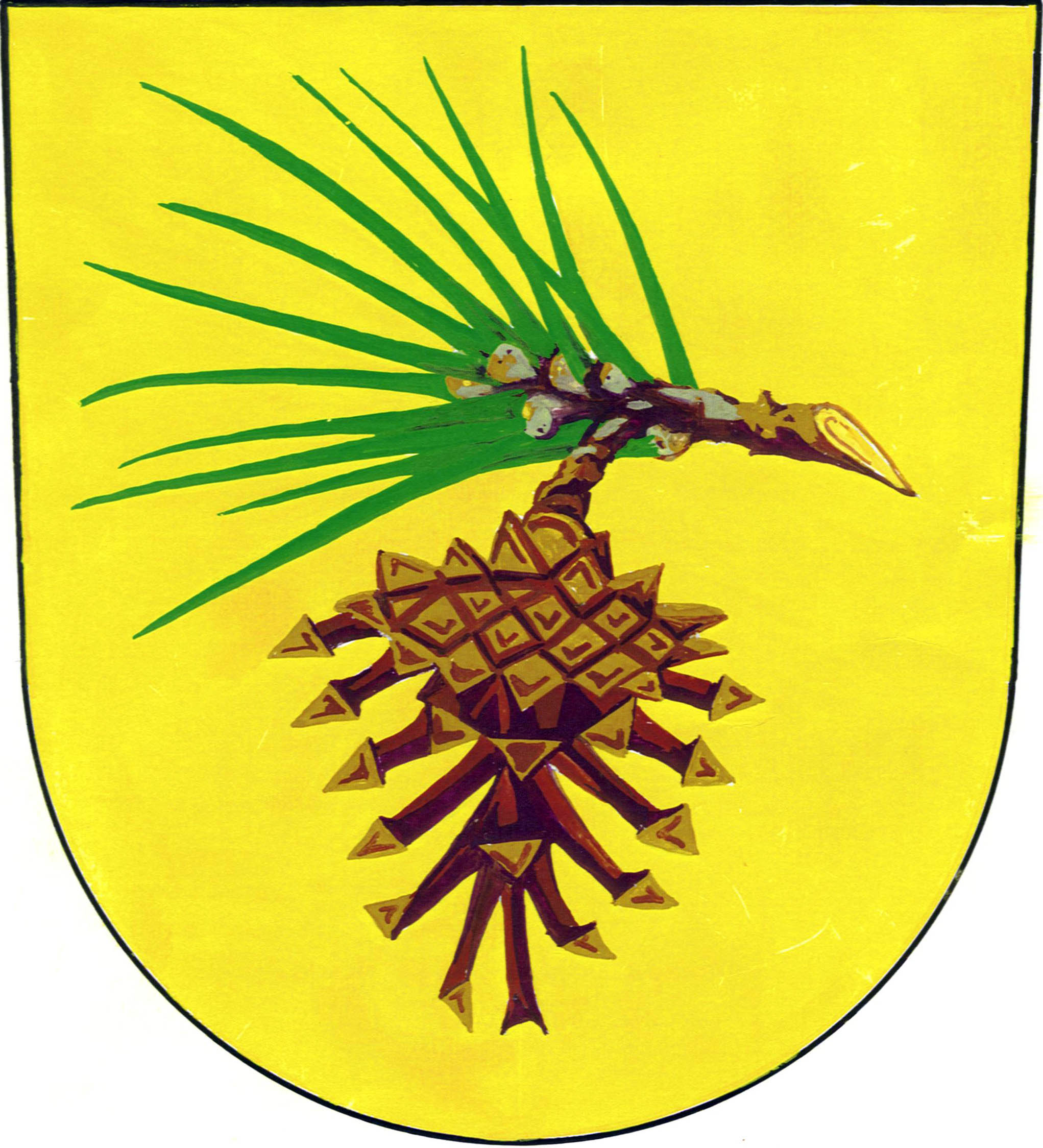
- Flag Coat of arms

- Location in the Czech Republic
- Coordinates: 49°49′20″N 16°7′37″E
- Country: Czech Republic
- Region: Pardubice
- District: Chrudim
- First mentioned: 1559

Area
  - Total: 4.35 km^{2} (1.68 sq mi)
- Elevation: 477 m (1,565 ft)

Population (2026-01-01)
  - Total: 132
  - Density: 30.3/km^{2} (78.6/sq mi)
- Time zone: UTC+1 (CET)
  - Summer (DST): UTC+2 (CEST)
- Postal code: 539 44
- Website: web.boruskutce.cz

Bor u Skutče is a municipality and village in Chrudim District in the Pardubice Region of the Czech Republic. It has about 100 inhabitants.

== Demographics ==
Historical population
Year	Pop.	±%
1869	385	—
1880	386	+0.3%
1890	399	+3.4%
1900	375	−6.0%
1910	379	+1.1%
1921	364	−4.0%
1930	389	+6.9%
1950	242	−37.8%
1961	248	+2.5%
1970	207	−16.5%
1980	201	−2.9%
1991	179	−10.9%
2001	177	−1.1%
2011	148	−16.4%
2021	140	−5.4%
Source: Censuses
