= Úhřetice =

- Municipality
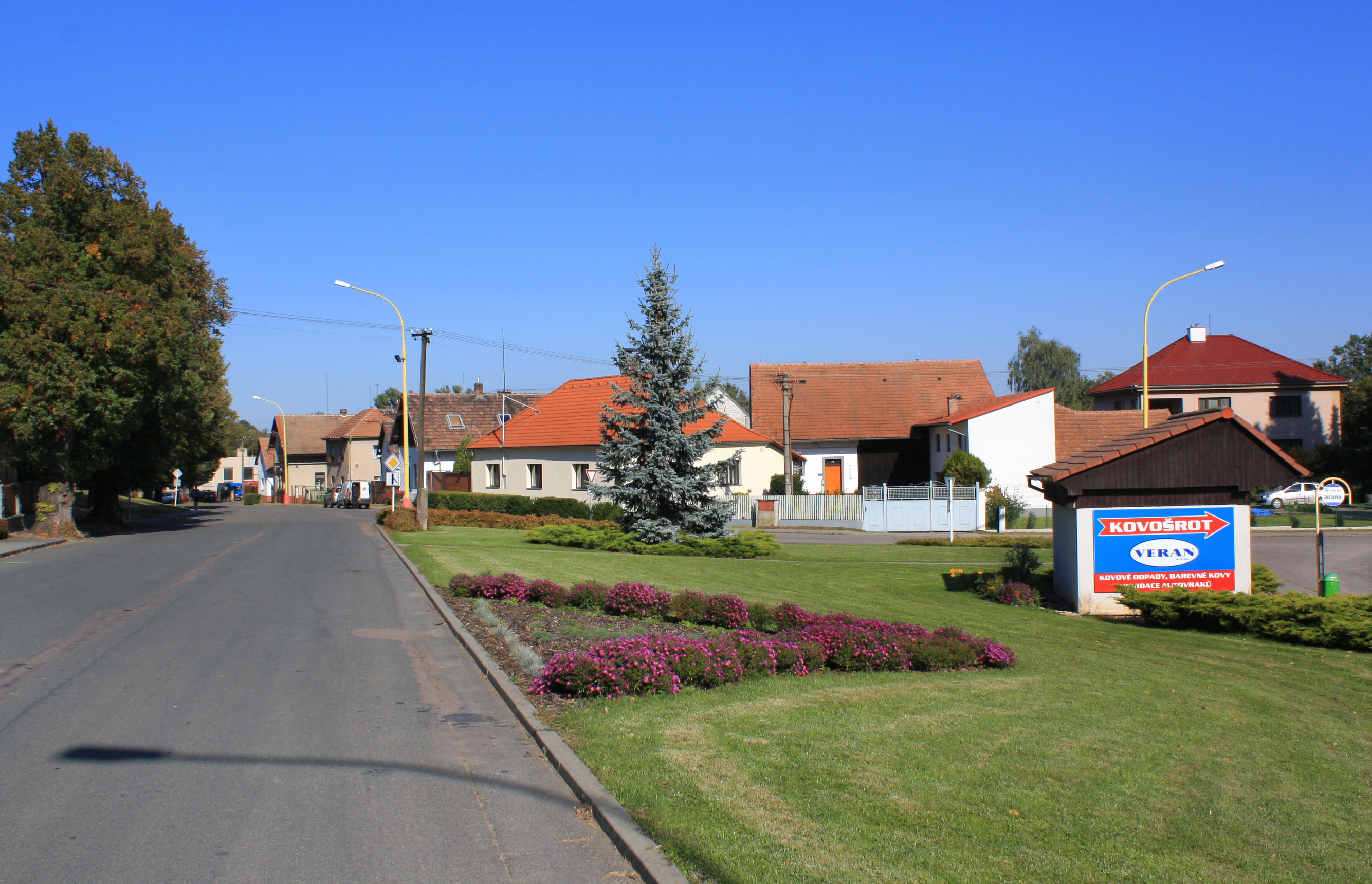
- Centre of Úhřetice

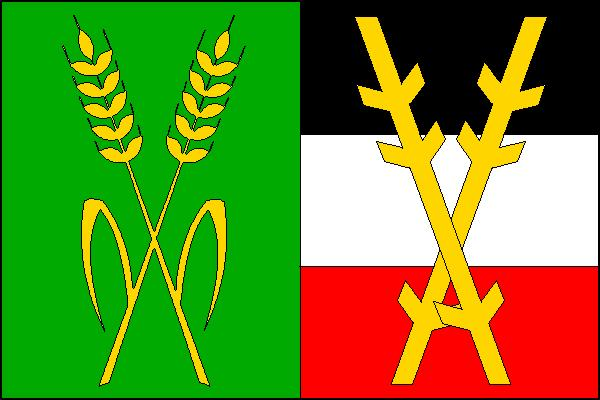
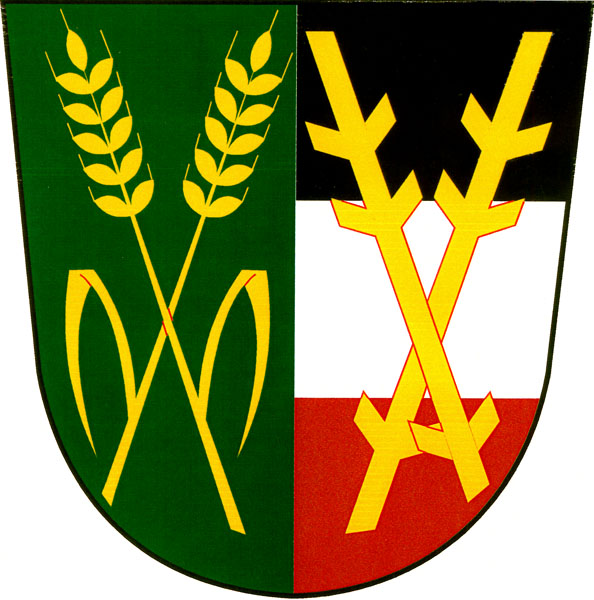
- Flag Coat of arms

- Location in the Czech Republic
- Coordinates: 49°58′45″N 15°52′2″E
- Country: Czech Republic
- Region: Pardubice
- District: Chrudim
- First mentioned: 1394

Area
  - Total: 4.69 km^{2} (1.81 sq mi)
- Elevation: 237 m (778 ft)

Population (2026-01-01)
  - Total: 486
  - Density: 104/km^{2} (268/sq mi)
- Time zone: UTC+1 (CET)
  - Summer (DST): UTC+2 (CEST)
- Postal code: 538 32
- Website: www.uhretice.cz

Úhřetice is a municipality and village in Chrudim District in the Pardubice Region of the Czech Republic. It has about 500 inhabitants.

== Demographics ==
Historical population
Year	Pop.	±%
1869	365	—
1880	450	+23.3%
1890	430	−4.4%
1900	517	+20.2%
1910	540	+4.4%
1921	514	−4.8%
1930	478	−7.0%
1950	424	−11.3%
1961	507	+19.6%
1970	533	+5.1%
1980	571	+7.1%
1991	490	−14.2%
2001	462	−5.7%
2011	441	−4.5%
2021	460	+4.3%
Source: Censuses
