= Vejvanovice =

- Municipality
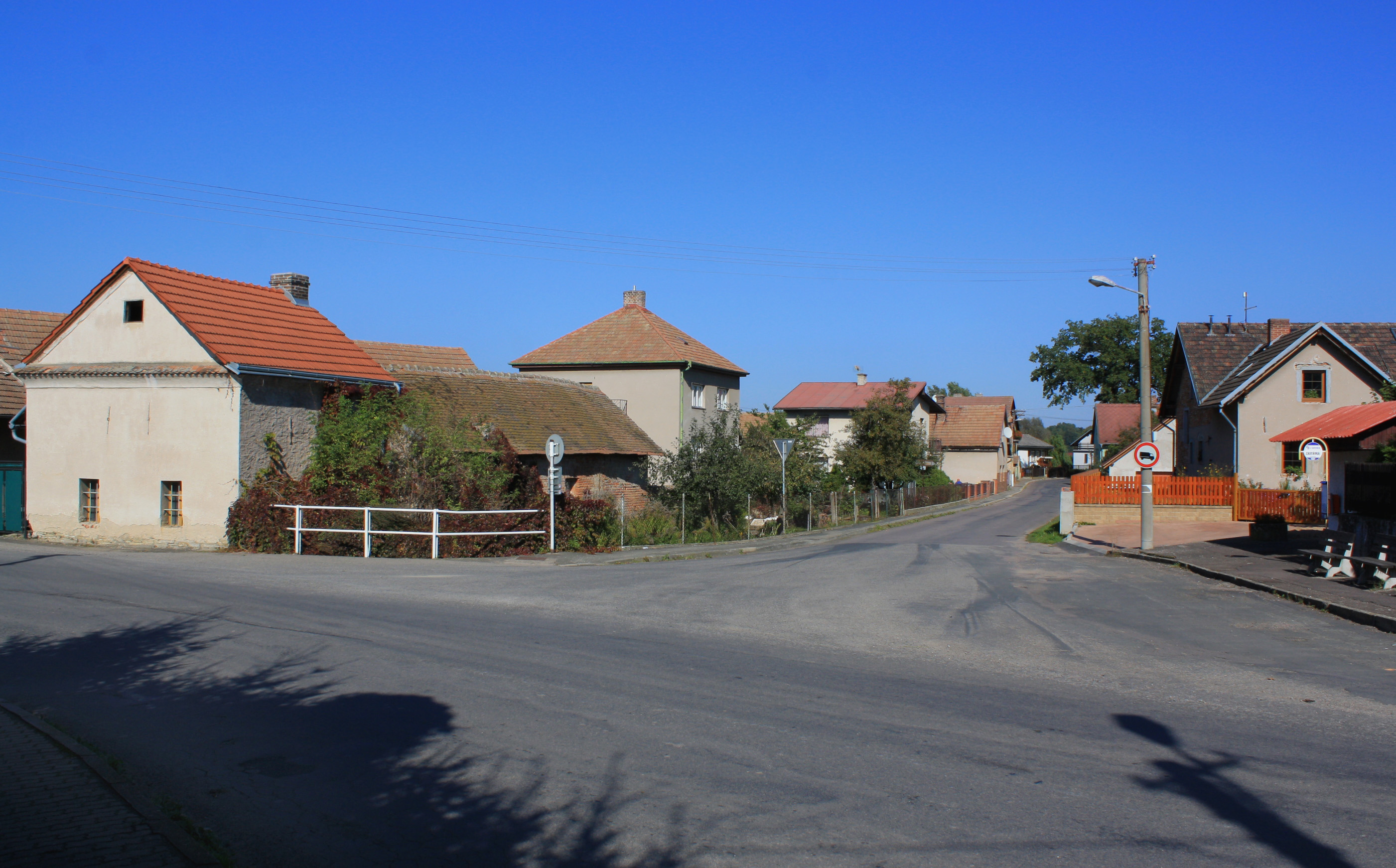
- Centre of Vejvanovice

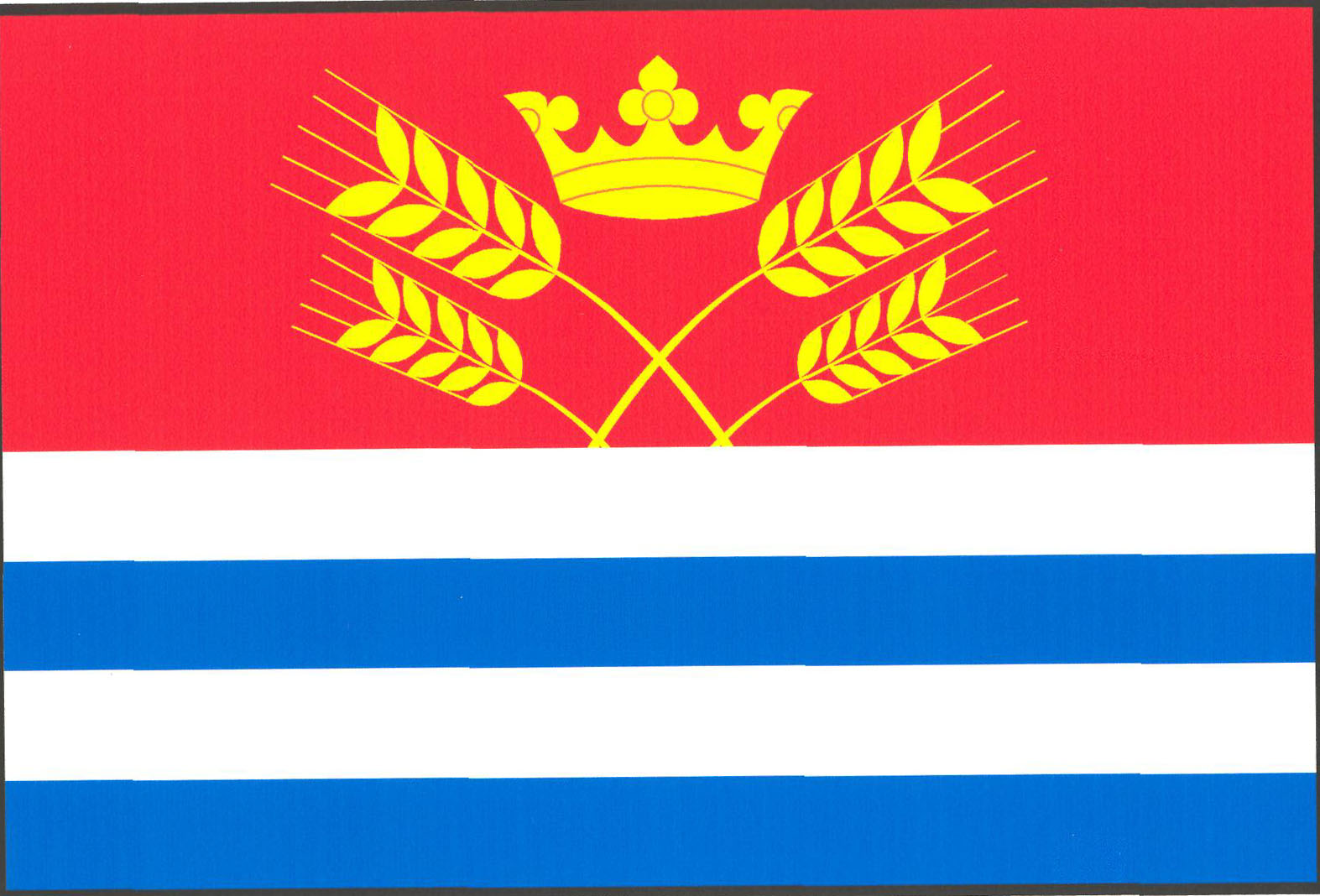
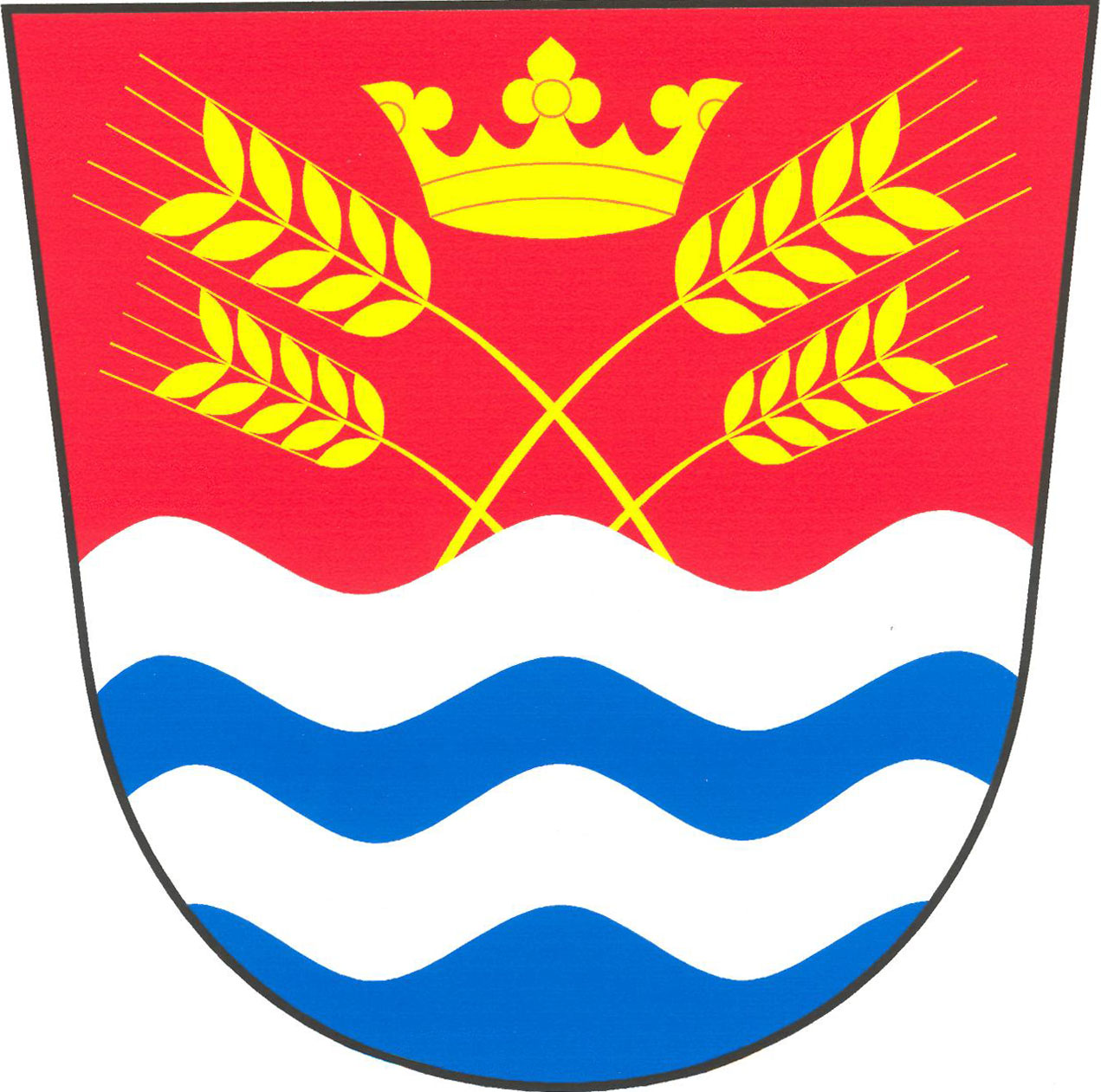
- Flag Coat of arms

- Location in the Czech Republic
- Coordinates: 49°58′15″N 15°52′48″E
- Country: Czech Republic
- Region: Pardubice
- District: Chrudim
- First mentioned: 1167

Area
  - Total: 2.75 km^{2} (1.06 sq mi)
- Elevation: 248 m (814 ft)

Population (2026-01-01)
  - Total: 294
  - Density: 107/km^{2} (277/sq mi)
- Time zone: UTC+1 (CET)
  - Summer (DST): UTC+2 (CEST)
- Postal code: 538 62
- Website: www.vejvanovice.cz

Vejvanovice is a municipality and village in Chrudim District in the Pardubice Region of the Czech Republic. It has about 300 inhabitants.

== Demographics ==
Historical population
Year	Pop.	±%
1869	407	—
1880	446	+9.6%
1890	443	−0.7%
1900	439	−0.9%
1910	516	+17.5%
1921	484	−6.2%
1930	478	−1.2%
1950	374	−21.8%
1961	361	−3.5%
1970	358	−0.8%
1980	298	−16.8%
1991	275	−7.7%
2001	294	+6.9%
2011	292	−0.7%
2021	287	−1.7%
Source: Censuses
