= Nové Hrady (Ústí nad Orlicí District) =

- Municipality
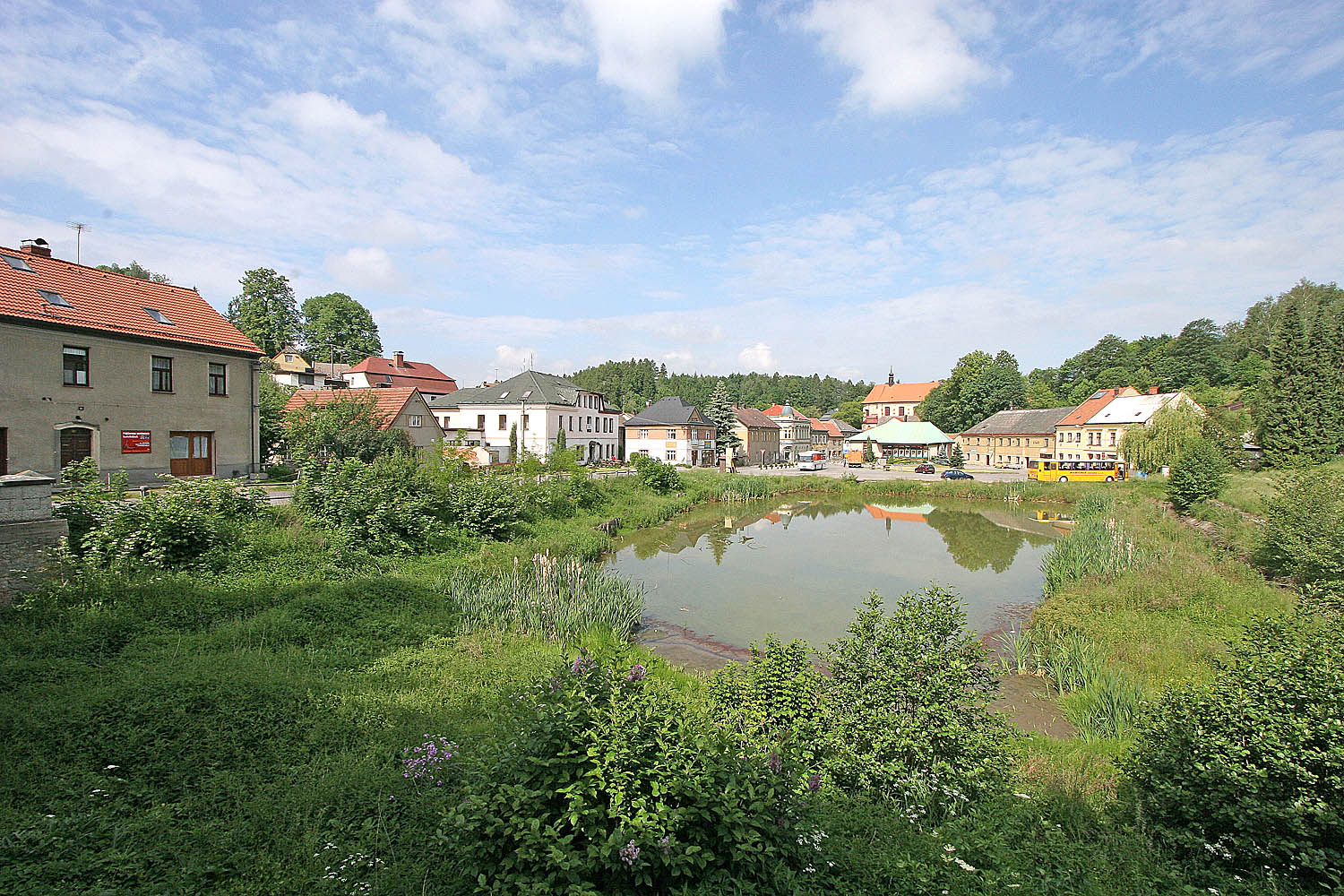
- View towards the Nové Hrady Castle

- Flag Coat of arms

- Location in the Czech Republic
- Coordinates: 49°51′6″N 16°8′38″E
- Country: Czech Republic
- Region: Pardubice
- District: Ústí nad Orlicí
- First mentioned: 1293

Area
  - Total: 6.73 km^{2} (2.60 sq mi)
- Elevation: 384 m (1,260 ft)

Population (2026-01-01)
  - Total: 306
  - Density: 45.5/km^{2} (118/sq mi)
- Time zone: UTC+1 (CET)
  - Summer (DST): UTC+2 (CEST)
- Postal code: 539 45
- Website: www.obecnovehrady.cz

Nové Hrady (German: Neuschloss) is a municipality and village in Ústí nad Orlicí District in the Pardubice Region of the Czech Republic. It has about 300 inhabitants.

== Administrative division ==
Nové Hrady consists of three municipal parts (in brackets population according to the 2021 census):

- Nové Hrady (230)
- Mokrá Lhota (67)
- Rybníček (7)

== Etymology ==
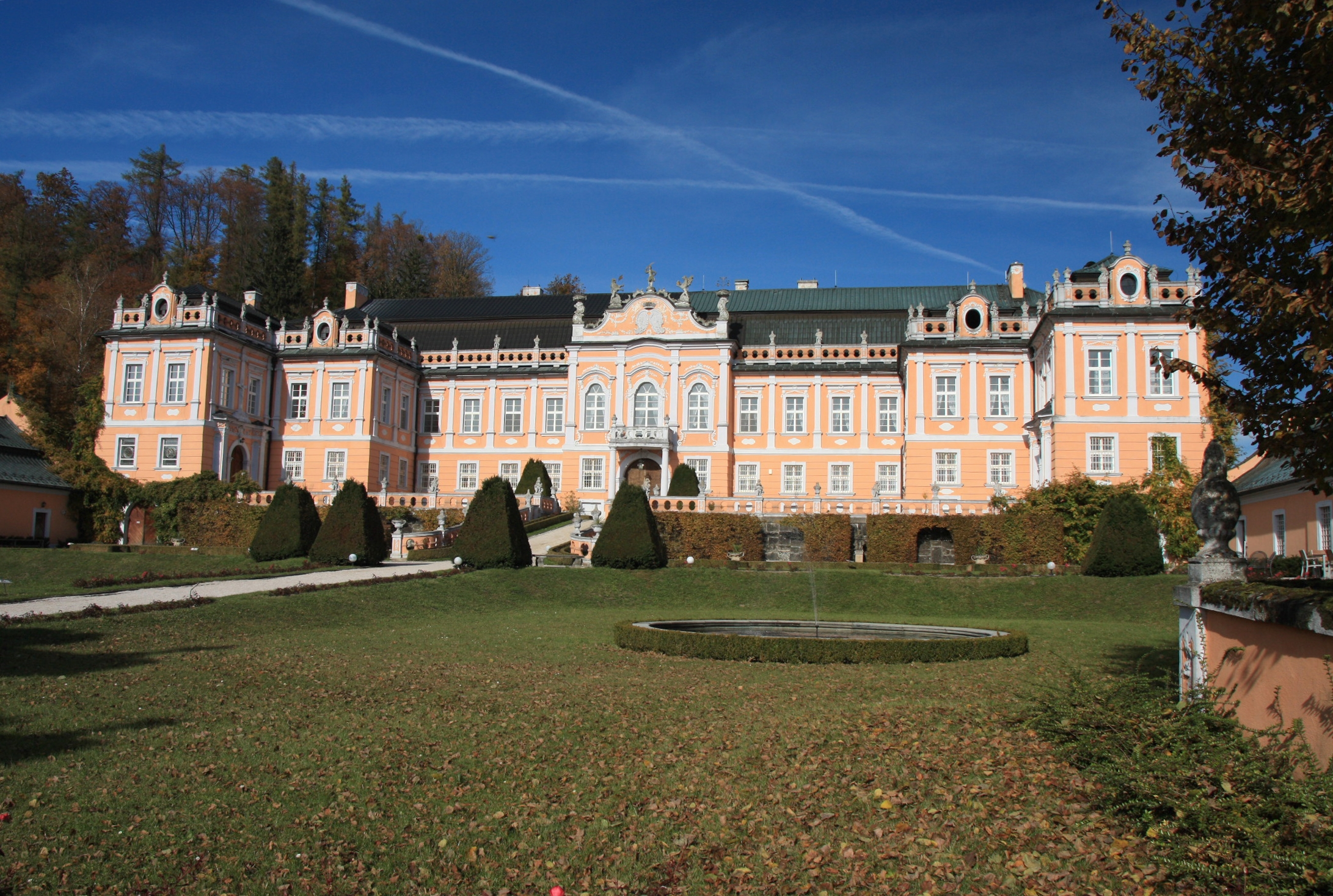
Nové Hrady Castle

After the settlement was founded, it was called Boží Dům (i.e. "God's house") after the first church built in the area. When the old castle was replaced by a new one, the village was renamed Nové Hrady (literally 'new castles').

== Geography ==
Nové Hrady is located about 22 kilometres (14 mi) southwest of Ústí nad Orlicí and 32 km (20 mi) southeast of Pardubice. It lies in the Svitavy Uplands. The highest point is at 470 m (1,542 ft) above sea level. The Novohradka River flows through the southern and western parts of the municipal territory. A system of fishponds supplied by the stream Hradecký potok is located in the village proper.

== History ==
The first written mention of Nové Hrady is from 1293. At that time, the village belonged to the Litomyšl estate and shared its owner. A late Gothic castle was built on the site of an old castle in 1442–1468 by the then-owner of Litomyšl, Zdeněk Kostka of Postupice, and the Nové Hrady estate was established. The Gothic castle was rebuilt into a Renaissance residence in the 15th century, but during the Thirty Years' War, it was looted and destroyed by Swedish army.

Nové Hrady saw its rise in the 18th century. In 1750, the French aristocratic Harbuval de Chamarè family bought the estate and had built the Nové Hrady Castle. The family gradually became poorer, so at the beginning of the 20th century, they sold the estate.

== Demographics ==
Historical population

Year	Pop.	±%
1869	1,062	—
1880	1,132	+6.6%
1890	1,037	−8.4%
1900	985	−5.0%
1910	1,021	+3.7%

Year	Pop.	±%
1921	923	−9.6%
1930	797	−13.7%
1950	575	−27.9%
1961	581	+1.0%
1970	511	−12.0%

Year	Pop.	±%
1980	408	−20.2%
1991	318	−22.1%
2001	284	−10.7%
2011	284	+0.0%
2021	304	+7.0%

Source: Censuses

== Transport ==
There are no railways or major roads passing through the municipality.

== Sights ==
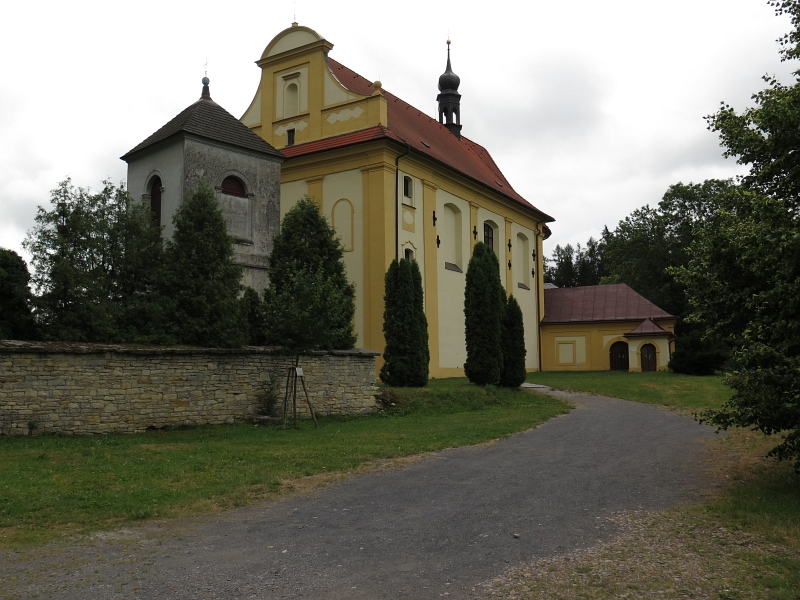
Church of Saint James the Great

Nové Hrady is known for Nové Hrady Castle. It was built in the Rococo style in 1773–1777, in the style of French summer residence. The castle is nicknamed "Czech Versailles" and "Little Schönbrunn". The building is unique within the country for the style in which it was built and because it was never rebuilt. It is privately owned, but it is open to the public and offers sightseeing tours. The castle is surrounded by several gardens and with and English-style park, in which a hill with ruins of the former Gothic castle is located.

Other sights include the Church of Saint James the Great, built in the Baroque style in 1724, and the Stations of the Cross in the English park from 1767.
