= Jarošov (Svitavy District) =

- Municipality
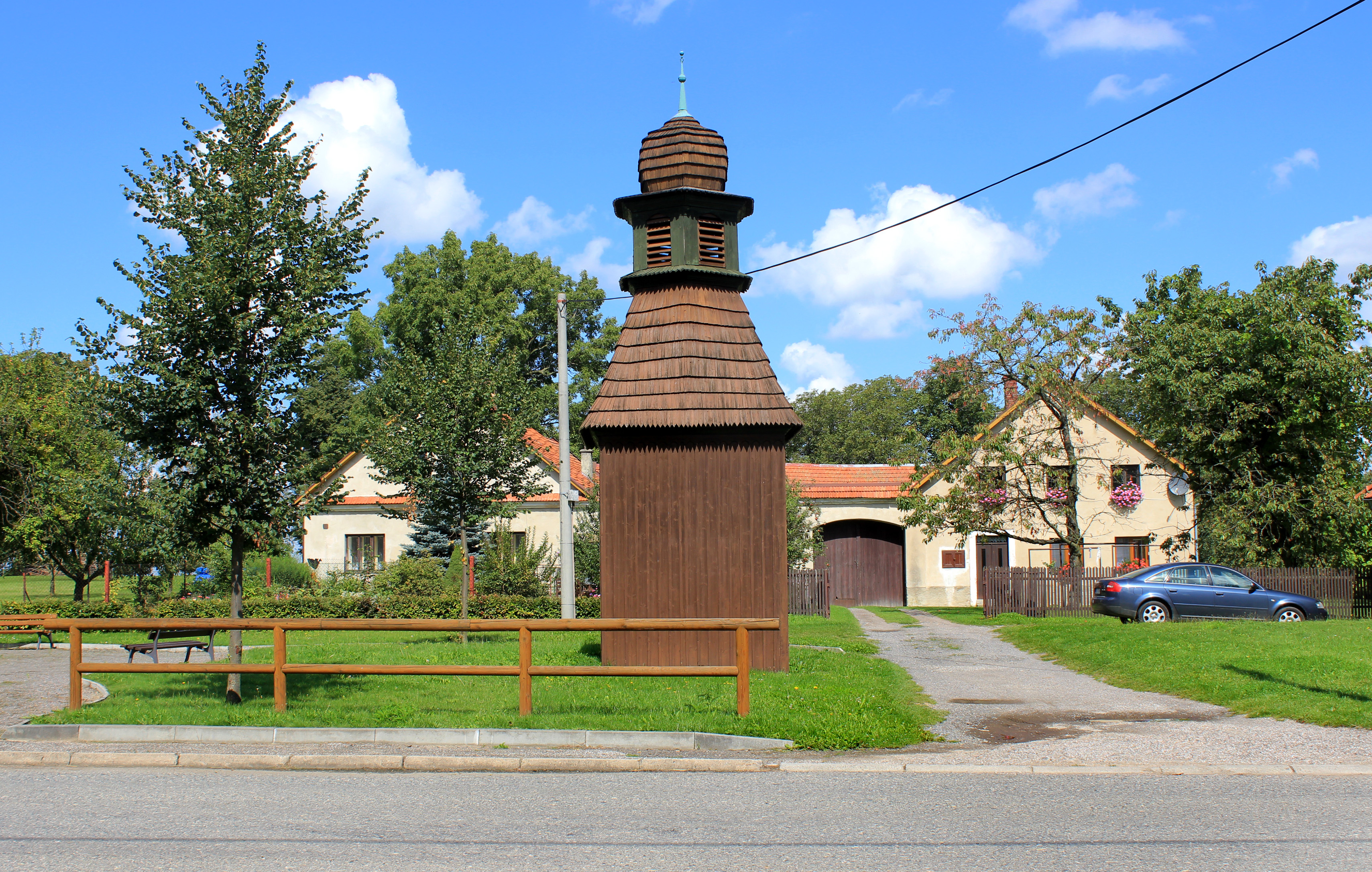
- Belfry in the centre of Jarošov

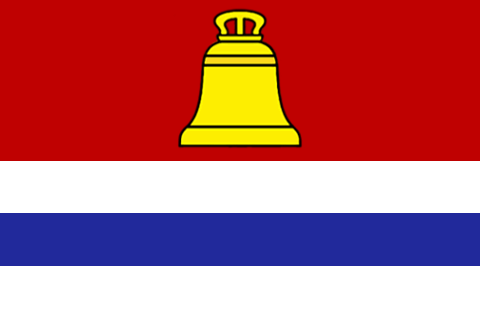
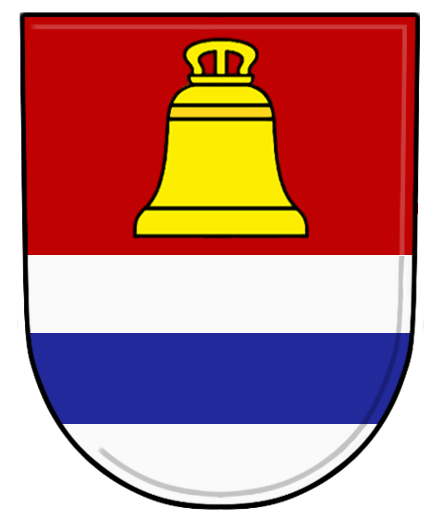
- Flag Coat of arms

- Location in the Czech Republic
- Coordinates: 49°49′29″N 16°9′48″E
- Country: Czech Republic
- Region: Pardubice
- District: Svitavy
- First mentioned: 1366

Area
  - Total: 5.13 km^{2} (1.98 sq mi)
- Elevation: 482 m (1,581 ft)

Population (2026-01-01)
  - Total: 197
  - Density: 38.4/km^{2} (99.5/sq mi)
- Time zone: UTC+1 (CET)
  - Summer (DST): UTC+2 (CEST)
- Postal code: 569 66
- Website: www.obecjarosov.cz

Jarošov is a municipality and village in Svitavy District in the Pardubice Region of the Czech Republic. It has about 200 inhabitants.

Jarošov lies approximately 23 kilometres (14 mi) west of Svitavy, 37 km (23 mi) south-east of Pardubice, and 129 km (80 mi) east of Prague.

== Demographics ==
Historical population
Year	Pop.	±%
1869	690	—
1880	565	−18.1%
1890	536	−5.1%
1900	528	−1.5%
1910	543	+2.8%
1921	535	−1.5%
1930	458	−14.4%
1950	317	−30.8%
1961	304	−4.1%
1970	234	−23.0%
1980	197	−15.8%
1991	186	−5.6%
2001	184	−1.1%
2011	196	+6.5%
2021	179	−8.7%
Source: Censuses
