= Zájezdec =

- Municipality
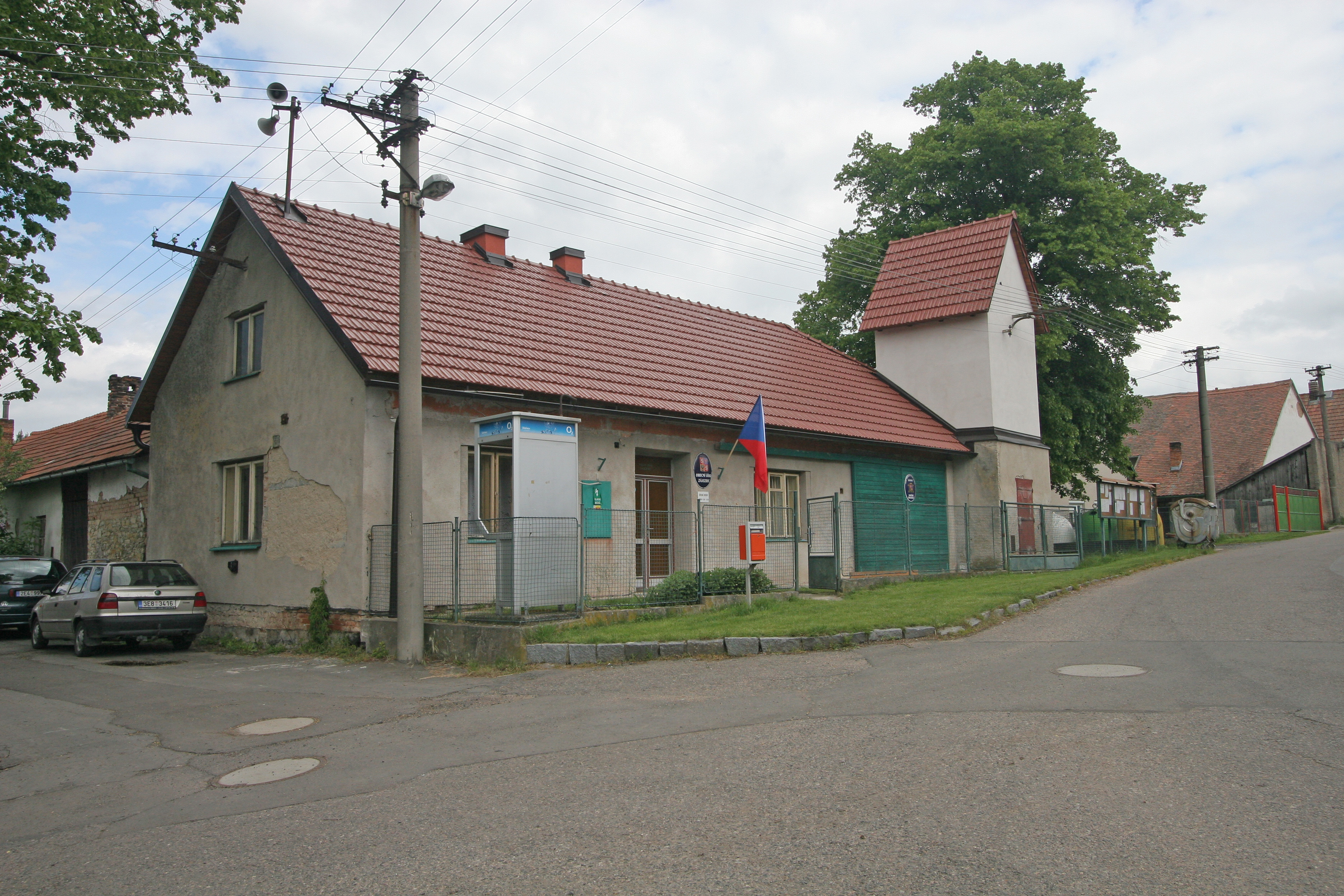
- Municipal office

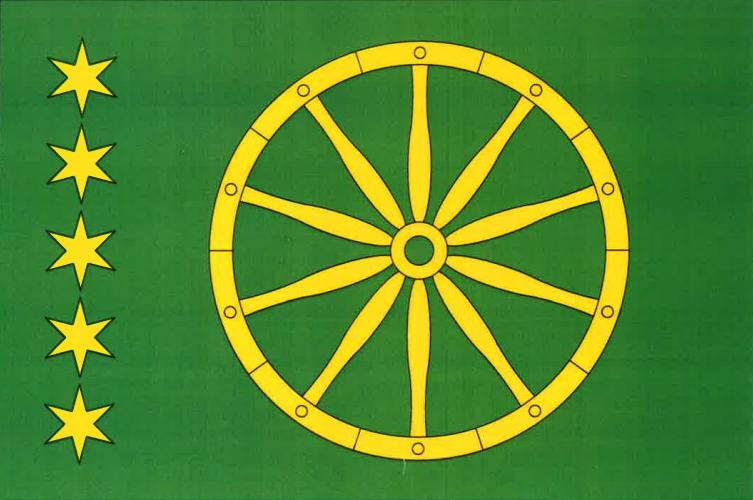
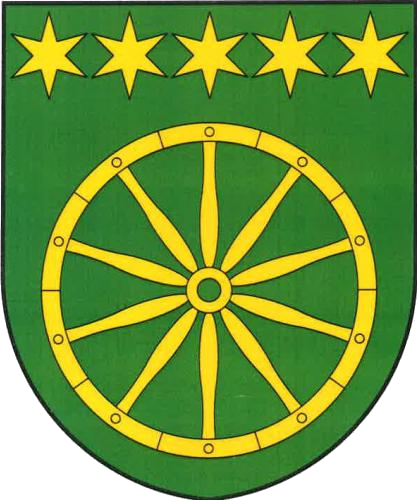
- Flag Coat of arms

- Location in the Czech Republic
- Coordinates: 49°55′54″N 15°55′37″E
- Country: Czech Republic
- Region: Pardubice
- District: Chrudim
- First mentioned: 1318

Area
  - Total: 1.56 km^{2} (0.60 sq mi)
- Elevation: 264 m (866 ft)

Population (2026-01-01)
  - Total: 107
  - Density: 68.6/km^{2} (178/sq mi)
- Time zone: UTC+1 (CET)
  - Summer (DST): UTC+2 (CEST)
- Postal code: 538 51
- Website: www.zajezdec.cz

Zájezdec is a municipality and village in Chrudim District in the Pardubice Region of the Czech Republic. It has about 100 inhabitants.

== Demographics ==
Historical population
Year	Pop.	±%
1869	373	—
1880	365	−2.1%
1890	329	−9.9%
1900	314	−4.6%
1910	279	−11.1%
1921	274	−1.8%
1930	264	−3.6%
1950	203	−23.1%
1961	179	−11.8%
1970	165	−7.8%
1980	117	−29.1%
1991	97	−17.1%
2001	99	+2.1%
2011	125	+26.3%
2021	96	−23.2%
Source: Censuses
