= Tisovec (disambiguation) =

Tisovec may mean:

- Tisovec, a town in central Slovakia
- Tisovec (Chrudim District), a village in the Czech Republic, in the Pardubice Region (Chrudim District)
- Tisovec, Slovenia, a settlement in the Municipality of Dobrepolje in Slovenia
