= Tisovec (Chrudim District) =

- Municipality
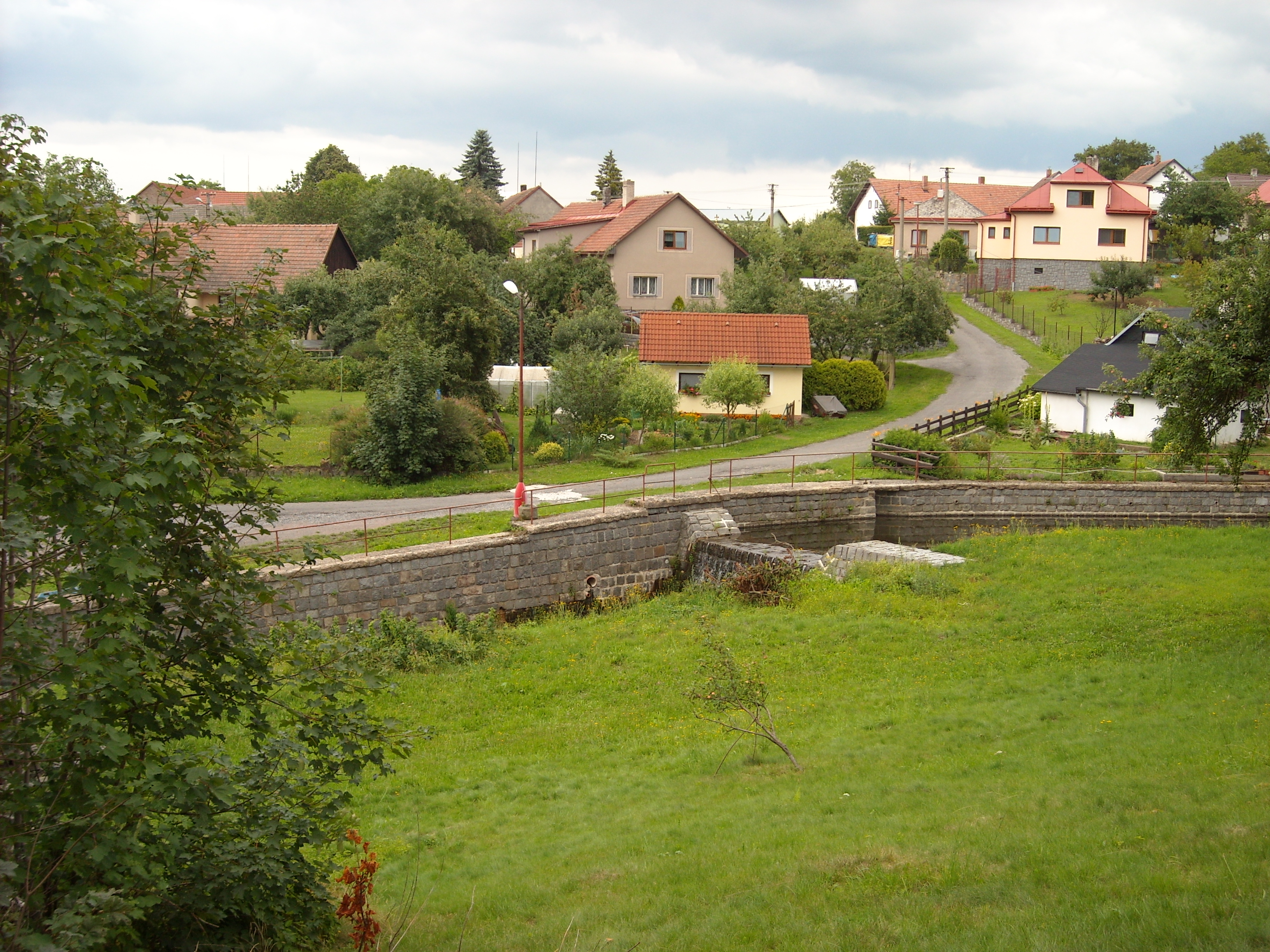
- Western part of Tisovec

- Flag Coat of arms

- Location in the Czech Republic
- Coordinates: 49°49′28″N 15°54′53″E
- Country: Czech Republic
- Region: Pardubice
- District: Chrudim
- First mentioned: 1545

Area
  - Total: 5.96 km^{2} (2.30 sq mi)
- Elevation: 437 m (1,434 ft)

Population (2026-01-01)
  - Total: 360
  - Density: 60/km^{2} (160/sq mi)
- Time zone: UTC+1 (CET)
  - Summer (DST): UTC+2 (CEST)
- Postal code: 539 73
- Website: www.tisovec.cz

Tisovec is a municipality and village in Chrudim District in the Pardubice Region of the Czech Republic. It has about 400 inhabitants.

== Administrative division ==
Tisovec consists of five municipal parts (in brackets population according to the 2021 census):

- Tisovec (67)
- Dřeveš (125)
- Kvasín (61)
- Otáňka (16)
- Vrbětice (47)

== Demographics ==
Historical population
Year	Pop.	±%
1869	548	—
1880	540	−1.5%
1890	558	+3.3%
1900	622	+11.5%
1910	622	+0.0%
1921	626	+0.6%
1930	680	+8.6%
1950	506	−25.6%
1961	516	+2.0%
1970	491	−4.8%
1980	387	−21.2%
1991	328	−15.2%
2001	328	+0.0%
2011	312	−4.9%
2021	316	+1.3%
Source: Censuses
