= Borek =

Borek may refer to:

== Food ==
- Börek, a family of pastries or pies made in the Middle East and the Balkans

== Places ==
=== Czech Republic ===
- Borek (České Budějovice District), a municipality and village in the South Bohemian Region
- Borek (Havlíčkův Brod District), a municipality and village in the Vysočina Region
- Borek (Jičín District), a municipality and village in the Hradec Králové Region
- Borek (Pardubice District), a municipality and village in the Pardubice Region
- Borek (Prague-East District), a municipality and village in the Central Bohemian Region
- Borek, a village and part of Dačice in the South Bohemian Region
- Borek, a village and part of Frýdštejn in the Liberec Region
- Borek, a village and part of Horka I in the Central Bohemian Region
- Borek, a village and part of Hrubá Skála in the Liberec Region
- Borek, a village and part of Košice (Tábor District) in the South Bohemian Region
- Borek, a village and part of Kozojedy (Plzeň-North District) in the Plzeň Region
- Borek, a village and part of Malšovice in the Ústí nad Labem Region
- Borek, a village and part of Pšov in the Karlovy Vary Region
- Borek (Rokycany), a village and part of Rokycany in the Plzeň Region
- Borek, a village and part of Skuteč in the Pardubice Region
- Borek, a village and part of Stráž (Tachov District) in the Plzeň Region
- Borek, a village and part of Suchomasty in the Central Bohemian Region
- Borek, a village and part of Třebovle in the Central Bohemian Region
- Borek, a village and part of Zahrádky (Česká Lípa District) in the Liberec Region
- Štěnovický Borek, a municipality and village in the Plzeň Region
- Velký Borek, a municipality and village in the Central Bohemian Region

=== Poland ===
- Borek, Głogów County in Lower Silesian Voivodeship (south-west Poland)
- Borek, Trzebnica County in Lower Silesian Voivodeship (south-west Poland)
- Borek, Wrocław in Lower Silesian Voivodeship (south-west Poland)
- Borek, Gmina Kamionka in Lublin Voivodeship (east Poland)
- Borek, Golub-Dobrzyń County in Kuyavian-Pomeranian Voivodeship (north-central Poland)
- Borek, Radziejów County in Kuyavian-Pomeranian Voivodeship (central Poland)
- Borek, Włocławek County in Kuyavian-Pomeranian Voivodeship (central Poland)
- Borek, Toruń County in Kuyavian-Pomeranian Voivodeship (north-central Poland)
- Borek, Hajnówka County in Podlaskie Voivodeship (north-east Poland)
- Borek, Sokółka County in Podlaskie Voivodeship (north-east Poland)
- Borek, Łęczyca County in Łódź Voivodeship (central Poland)
- Borek, Poddębice County in Łódź Voivodeship (central Poland)
- Borek, Lesser Poland Voivodeship (south Poland)
- Borek, Świętokrzyskie Voivodeship (south Poland)
- Borek, Kozienice County in Masovian Voivodeship (east-central Poland)
- Borek, Ostrołęka County in Masovian Voivodeship (east-central Poland)
- Borek, Gmina Wielichowo, Grodzisk County in Greater Poland Voivodeship (west-central Poland)
- Borek, Gmina Godziesze Wielkie in Greater Poland Voivodeship (central Poland)
- Borek, Gmina Szczytniki in Greater Poland Voivodeship (central Poland)
- Borek, Kępno County in Greater Poland Voivodeship (south-central Poland)
- Borek, Rawicz County in Greater Poland Voivodeship (west-central Poland)
- Borek, Szamotuły County in Greater Poland Voivodeship (west-central Poland)
- Borek, Wolsztyn County in Greater Poland Voivodeship (west-central Poland)
- Borek, Częstochowa County in Silesian Voivodeship (south Poland)
- Borek, Gorzów County in Lubusz Voivodeship (west Poland)
- Borek, Zielona Góra County in Lubusz Voivodeship (west Poland)
- Borek, Brzeg County in Opole Voivodeship (south-west Poland)
- Borek, Kluczbork County in Opole Voivodeship (south Poland)
- Borek, Gmina Krapkowice in Opole Voivodeship (south Poland)
- Borek, Namysłów County in Opole Voivodeship (south-west Poland)
- Borek, Nysa County in Opole Voivodeship (south-west Poland)
- Borek, Olesno County in Opole Voivodeship (south Poland)
- Borek, Gmina Turawa, Opole County in Opole Voivodeship (south Poland)
- Borek, Gmina Zdzieszowice, in Opole Voivodeship (south Poland)
- Borek, Pomeranian Voivodeship (north Poland)
- Borek, Gołdap County in Warmian-Masurian Voivodeship (north-east Poland)
- Borek, Iława County in Warmian-Masurian Voivodeship (north Poland)
- Borek, Pisz County in Warmian-Masurian Voivodeship (north Poland)

== People ==
- Borek (name), a Czech given name and surname
- Bořek, a Czech given name

== Other uses ==
- Kenn Borek Air, a Canadian airline

== See also ==
- Borik (disambiguation)
- Bourek (disambiguation)
