= Ostružno =

Ostružno may refer to places:

== Bosnia and Herzegovina ==
- Ostružno, Bosnia and Herzegovina, a village

== Czech Republic ==
- Ostružno (Jičín District), a municipality and village in the Hradec Králové Region
- Ostružno, a village and part of Borek (Havlíčkův Brod District) in the Vysočina Region
- Ostružno, a village and part of Nezdice na Šumavě in the South Bohemian Region

== See also ==
- Ostružná
