= Skuhrov =

Skuhrov may refer to places in the Czech Republic:

- Skuhrov (Beroun District), a municipality and village in the Central Bohemian Region
- Skuhrov (Havlíčkův Brod District), a municipality and village in the Vysočina Region
- Skuhrov (Jablonec nad Nisou District), a municipality and village in the Liberec Region
- Skuhrov, a village and part of Česká Třebová in the Pardubice Region
- Skuhrov, a village and part of Lomnice nad Popelkou in the Liberec Region
- Skuhrov, a village and part of Počepice in the Central Bohemian Region
- Skuhrov, a village and part of Rožmitál pod Třemšínem in the Central Bohemian Region
- Skuhrov, a village and part of Velký Borek in the Central Bohemian Region
- Skuhrov nad Bělou, a municipality and village in the Hradec Králové Region
