= Krenek =

Krenek may refer to:

- Ernst Krenek (1900–1991), Austrian and American composer
- Křenek (Prague-East District)
