= Klonk =

Czech national nature monument

Coordinates: 49°54′03″N 14°03′40″E

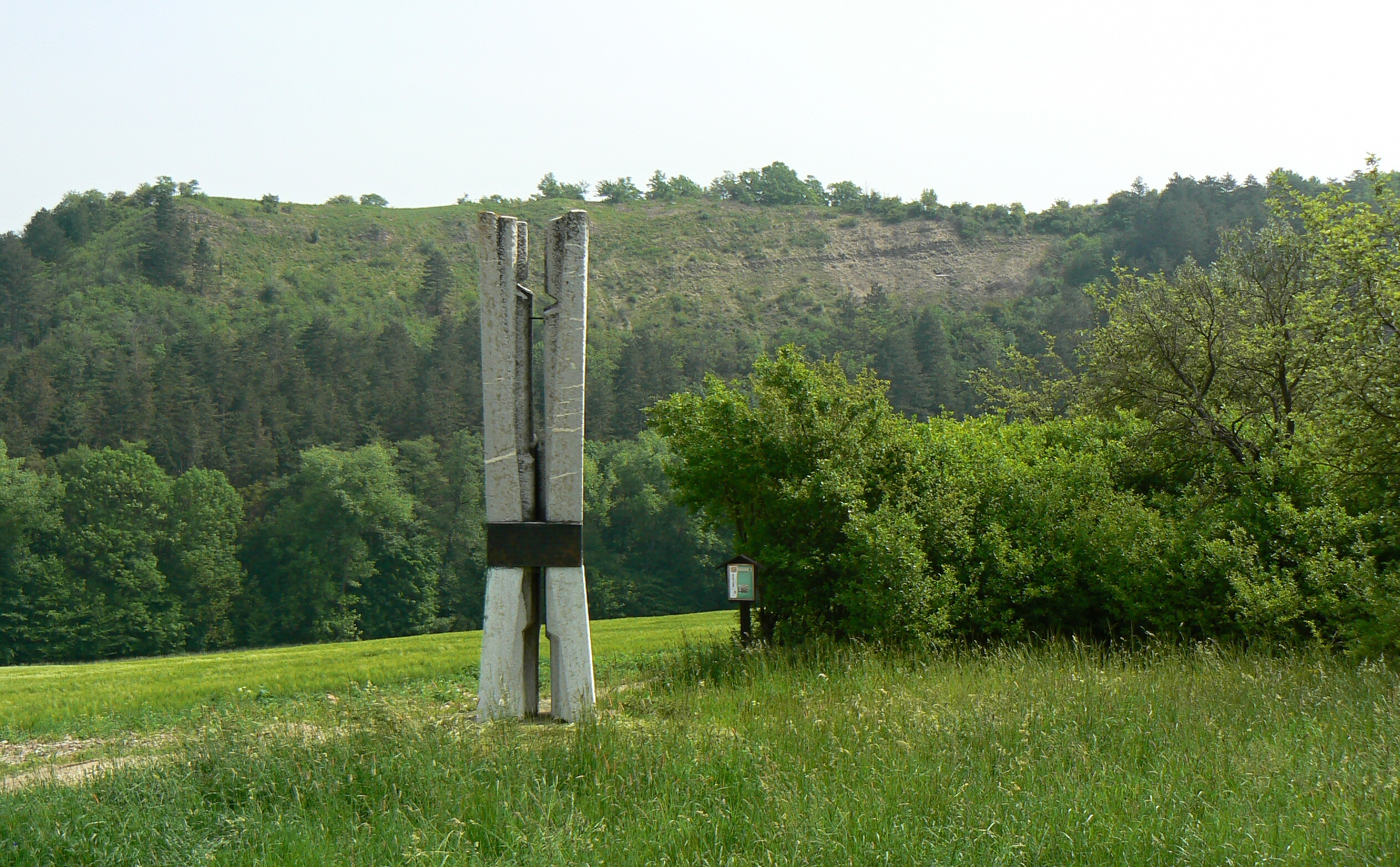
Stratotype – boundary between Devonian and Silurian

Klonk is a national nature monument in the Bohemian Karst Protected Landscape Area in the Czech Republic. It lies in the northern part of the municipality of Suchomasty, approximately 6 kilometres (4 mi) south of Beroun. It is globally recognized as a geologically important location due to the presence of the Global Boundary Stratotype Section and Point (GSSP) marking the boundary between Silurian and Devonian periods. The boundary was set based on the first appearance of the graptolite Monograptus uniformis in the bed number 20. The stratotype was ratified on 8 February 1972 by the International Union of Geological Sciences in Montreal as the first formally accepted GSSP.

== History ==
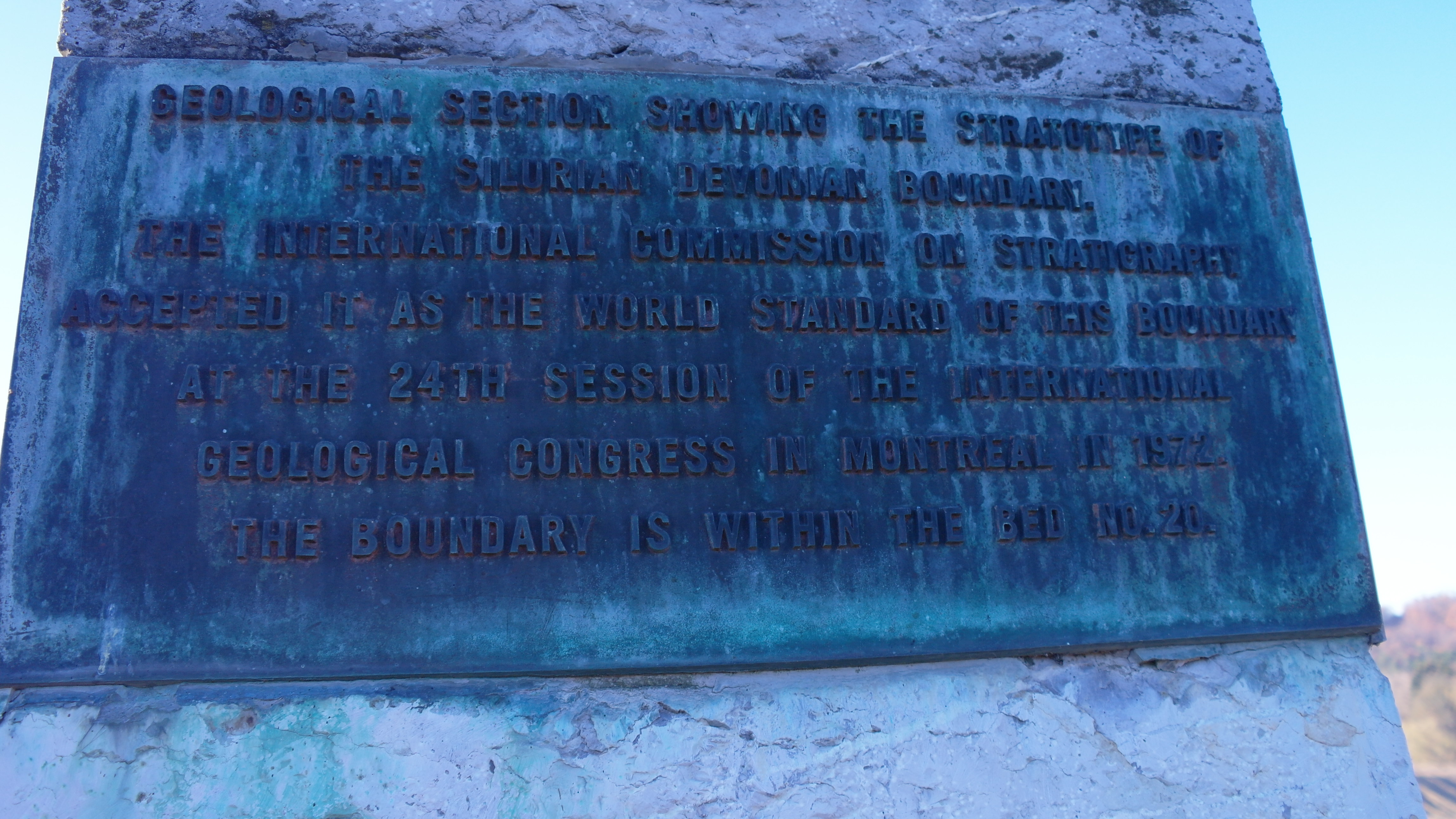
Monument inscription at Klonk

The positioning of the boundary between Silurian and Devonian has been a matter of discussion since the 19th century. The so-called hercynian question was resolved only after the ratification of the GSSP in 1972. The monument was declared as a protected area in 1977.

=== IUGS geological heritage site ===
In respect of its being the location of the 'first global boundary stratotype section and point (GSSP)', Klonk Hill was included by the International Union of Geological Sciences (IUGS) in its assemblage of 100 'geological heritage sites' around the world in a listing published in October 2022. The organisation defines an IUGS Geological Heritage Site as "a key place with geological elements and/or processes of international scientific relevance, used as a reference, and/or with a substantial contribution to the development of geological sciences through history."

== Geology ==
Klonk is a rocky slope by the right bank of Suchomastský brook. It contains two formations of upper Silurian (Kopanina formation, Požáry formation) and one formation of lower Devonian (Lochkov formation named for the nearby 'Lochkov profile'). Kopanina formation is represented by calcareous shales, Požáry formation by gray tabular limestones and bioclastic limestones can be found in Lochkov formation. The boundary beds are intact, without disturbance by tectonic processes, there are no facial changes and the profile is made of one continuous sequence.

There are various paleontologically significant objects, apart from the already mentioned graptolites it is possible to find the trilobite Warburgella rugulosa typical for the base of Devonian period, the conodont Icriodus wolschmidti and the chitinozoan Agnochitina chlupaci. Various other invertebrates can be found in the profile, such as bivalves, gastropods, crustaceans and brachiopods. Apart from animals, remains of terrestrial flora can also be found in the beds, namely the genus Cooksonia. Soils are rather undeveloped, only close above the brook in the lower part of the slope clayey screes can be found.

There is a unique monument representing the geological boundary set by international agreement. It was built in 1977 by academic sculptor Jiří Novotný.

== Flora and fauna ==
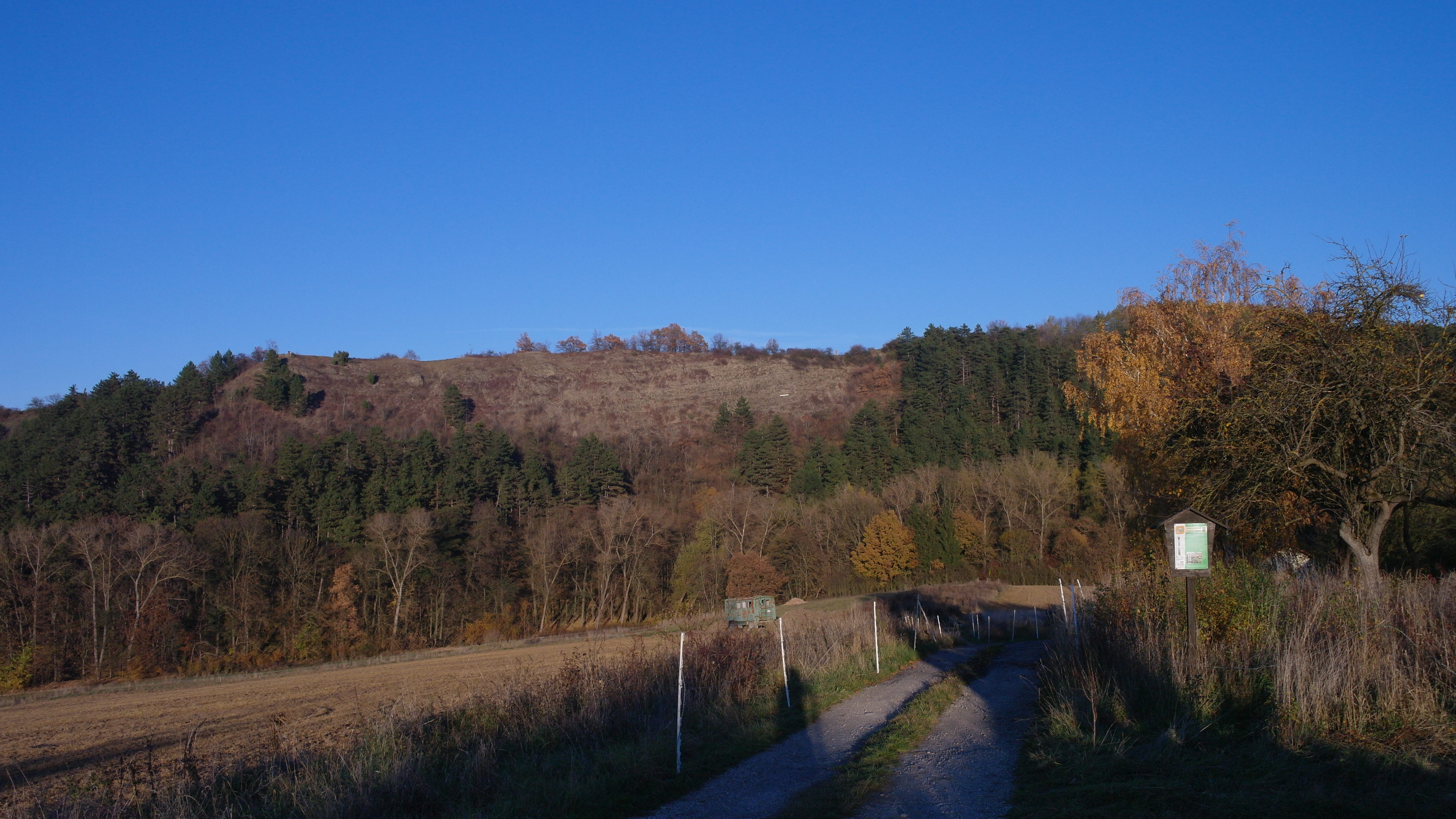
Geological profile with highlighted bed no. 20

Various plant communities can be found at Klonk. The vicinity of the brook is characterized by human planted vegetation, for example the common alder (Alnus glutinosa), European ash (Fraxinus excelsior) or Canadian poplar (Populus x canadensis), in the lower parts of the slope are the remains of scree forests with dominant sycamore. Shady limestones by the brook are a favourable location for a number of rare bryophytes, such as the craven featherwort (Pedinophyllum interruptum) or beech feather-moss (Eurhynchium crassinervum).

Most of the slope is covered by vegetation which is not native to the location – black pine (Pinus nigra), European larch (Larix decidua), black locust (Robinia pseudoaccacia) and Norway spruce (Picea abies). The original community of oak-hornbeam forests (sessile oak (Quercus petraea), common hornbeam (Carpinus betulus), field maple (Acer campestre)) can only be found in the upper parts of the profile. The formerly woodless areas tend to be covered by bushes of dog-rose (Rosa canina), blackthorn (Prunus spinosa) and common dogwood (Cornus sanguinea), atop the hill we may find an area of xerothermic grasslands such as spotted knapweed (Centaurea stoebe) and hairy oxytropis (Oxytropis pilosa).

Klonk is the nesting place for a number of birds, among others the grey wagtail (Motacilla cinerea), Eurasian sparrowhawk (Accipited nisus) or the common buzzard (Buteo buteo). Most of the fauna here is represented by invertebrates, however apart from other areas of the Bohemian karst it is somewhat poorer in molluscs. Vertebrate fauna is represented by red fox (Vulpes vulpes), European badger (Meles meles), wood mouse (Apodemus sylvaticus) and other, usually common species.

== Protection plan ==
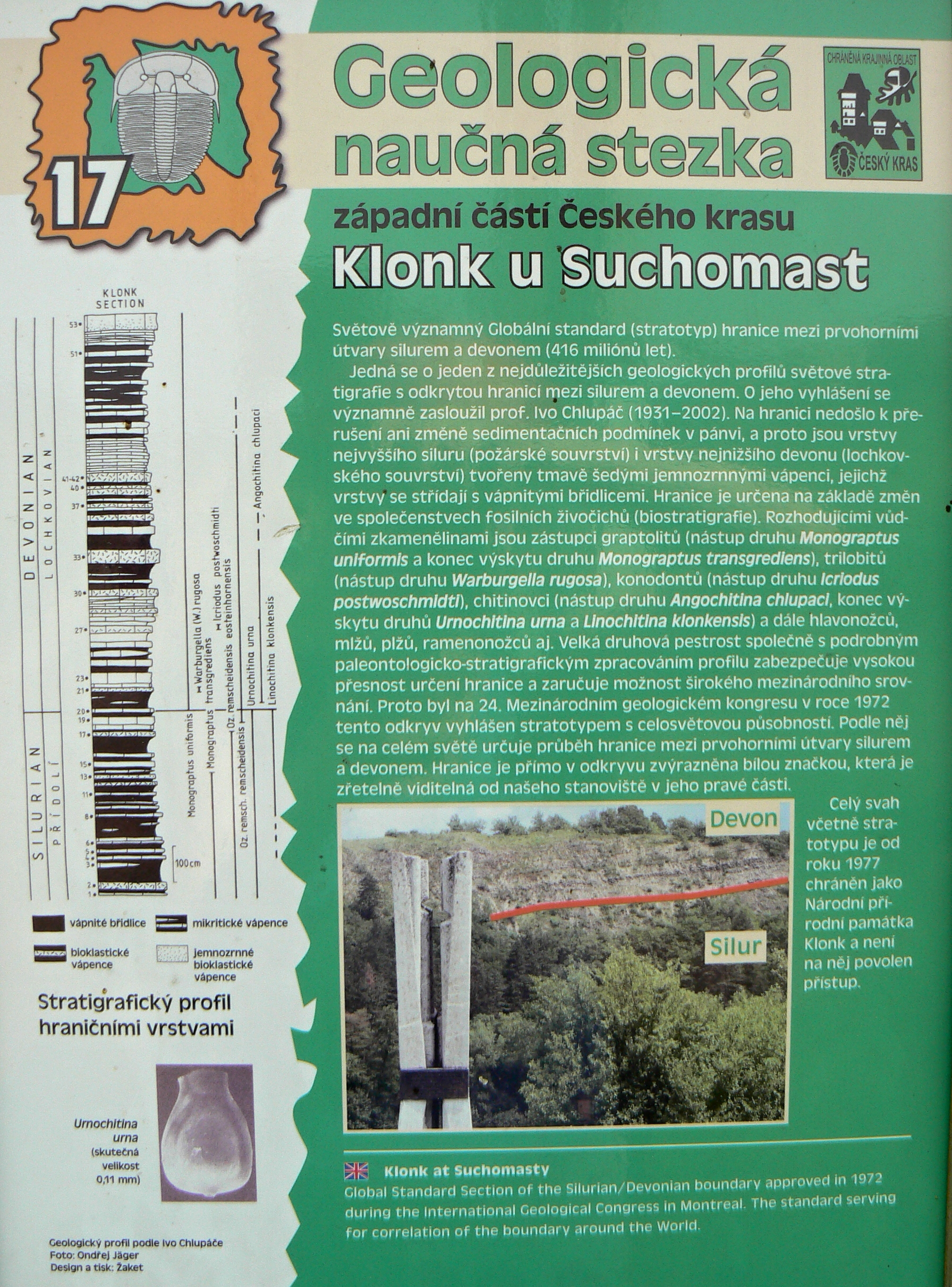
Information board of the educational trail

The goal of the protection plan is to secure the important geological profile and preserve it for future study. Klonk is mainly threatened by amateur palaeontologists who expect a rich locality, however the location is important mainly due to microfossils. Another threat is the overgrowing of vegetation, which has been successfully removed mechanically and by herbicides in the past. The removal of unwanted vegetation should also help the return of the original vegetation, which used to be strongly influenced by pasture. Plans for the future include marking of borders of the protected area in order to facilitate management, since it lies on parts of two private properties.

The profile is currently closed to the public not only to protect it, but also to avoid injuries of visitors on the steep slope.

== Educational trail ==
The location is a part of 39 kilometres (24 mi) long geological educational trail, which also leads through adjacent areas of importance such as Lom na Kobyle, Zlatý kůň, Koda and others. Individual localities aren't necessarily related and it is thus possible to travel only through certain segments of the trail. The trail is suitable even for cyclists and the information boards are in Czech with English abstract.
