= Bořivoj Čelovský =

Czech-Canadian historian

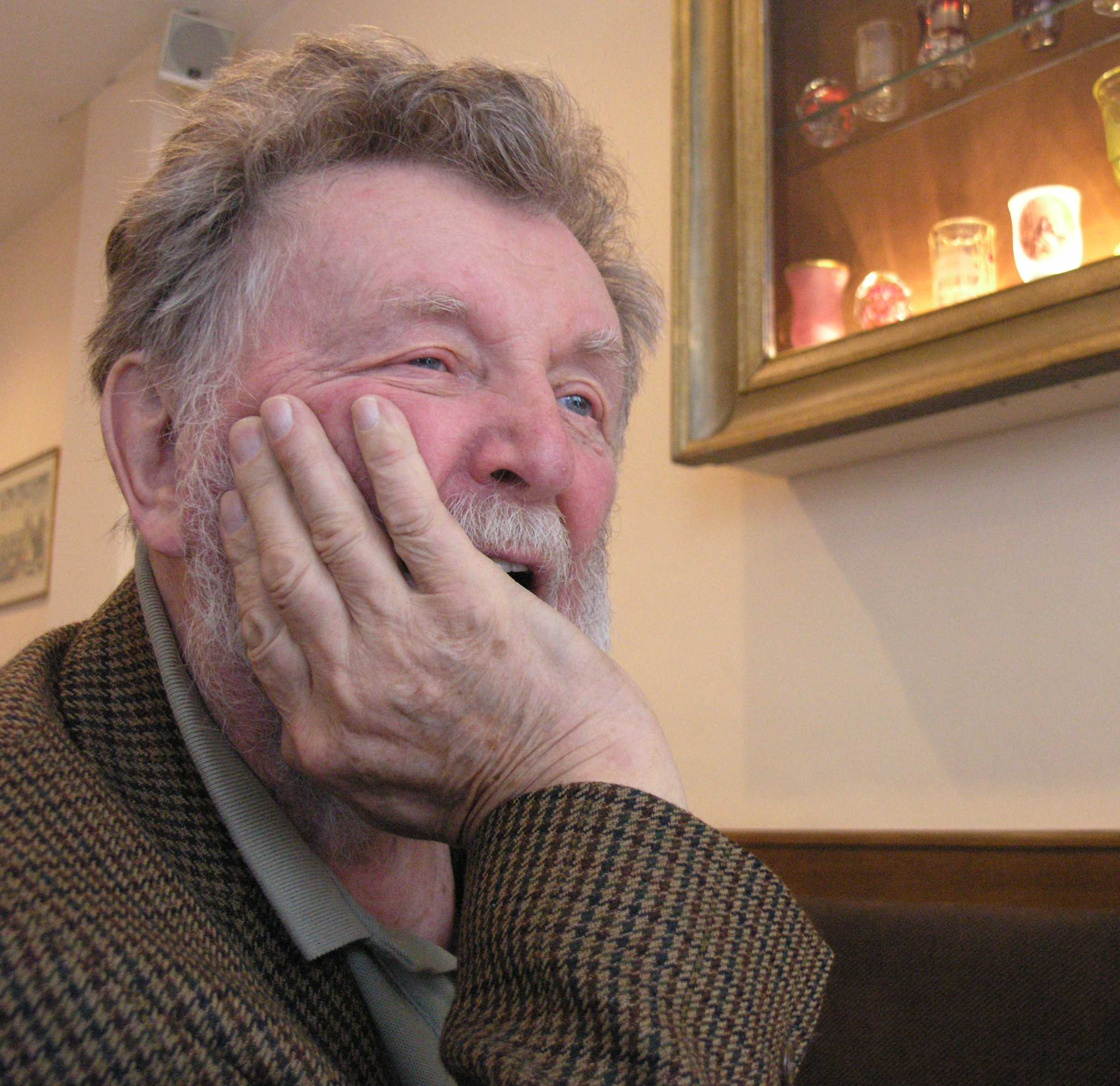
Bořivoj Čelovský

Bořivoj (Boris) Čelovský (8 September 1923, in Ostrava-Heřmanice – 12 February 2008) was a Czech-Canadian historian, member of the post-1948 Czechoslovak political exile and former political adviser. He was mostly dealing with historical and contemporary reflections of the Czech-German relationships.

== Biography ==
After finishing his secondary studies in Ostrava in 1942, Boris Čelovský was sent to Germany for compulsory labour. Later he was assigned to join the anti-aircraft service in Kiel where he saw many massive bombing campaigns of the Allies. After World War II he worked in the municipal archive in Opava and began to study law at the University of Prague. But a few years later, after the quickly forming communists took over the political power in Czechoslovakia in 1948, Čelovský escaped into exile, not willing to participate or passively linger on any kind of totality.

Čelovský got to various places during the exile, but Canada became his final second home country; there he is rather known as Boris Celovsky, a name that he used there, as the original was unpronounceable for English-speakers. He studied modern history at the University of Heidelberg and then at the Université de Montréal. His dissertation dealt with the Munich Agreement, still a "hot" theme at the time, and commenced both applausive as well as strictly negative reactions. After he had settled in Canada, he worked as a statistician for the Canadian government. At the same time, he cooperated with local counter-espionage, monitoring Czechoslovak agents in the country. Later he became an adviser of several Canadian politicians and in the 1970s he assisted the very successful election campaign of the New Democratic Party that later supported the government led by Pierre Trudeau in an unofficial coalition. Čelovský was the author of one of the most liberal immigration law of the time, under which Canada began to encourage a very large number of people from all over the world.

After the Velvet Revolution, when the communist regime in Czechoslovakia had been torn down, Čelovský moved back to Ostrava and started publishing plenty of books on various subjects (some of which were actually translated reprints of the books previously published in exile). He was known for his strongly anti-German opinions and a provoking style of presenting his ideas, yet still based on precise historical work. His books often escalated strong reactions, both positive and negative and initiated broad debates.

== Selected works ==
- Münchener Abkommen 1938, Deutsche Verlags-Anstalt, Stuttgart, 1958 (published also in Czech as Mnichovská dohoda 1938) - a reflection of the Munich agreement
- Stephanie von Hohenlohe, Herbig, 1988, ISBN 3-7766-1522-2 (published also in Czech as Ta ženská von Hohenlohe) - a life story of the close collaborator with Nazis though a Jew by origin
- So oder so, 1995 - the solution of the "Czech question" as proposed by German documents from between 1933 and 1945
- Šel jsem svou cestou (I went my own way), 1996 - autobiography
- Mnichovský syndrom (Munich syndrom), 1997
- Emigranti (Emigrants) - a collection of letters by the first refugees after the "Victorious February" (political power takeover by communists in 1948)
- Politici bez moci (Politicians without power) - dealing with the post-February Czechoslovak exile
- Konec českého tisku (The end of Czech press), 2001 - a warning note on the fact that most of the Czech newspapers and magazines are owned by German companies
