= Bourek =

Bourek may refer to:

- Zlatko Bourek (1929–2018) Jewish Croatian filmmaker
- Bourek (Algerian cuisine), Algerian pastry roll
- Bourek (film), 2015 Cypriot-US comedy film
- Malsouka, also known as bourek, North African pastry sheet similar to filo

== See also ==
- Borek (disambiguation)
