= Borek (Prague-East District) =

- Municipality
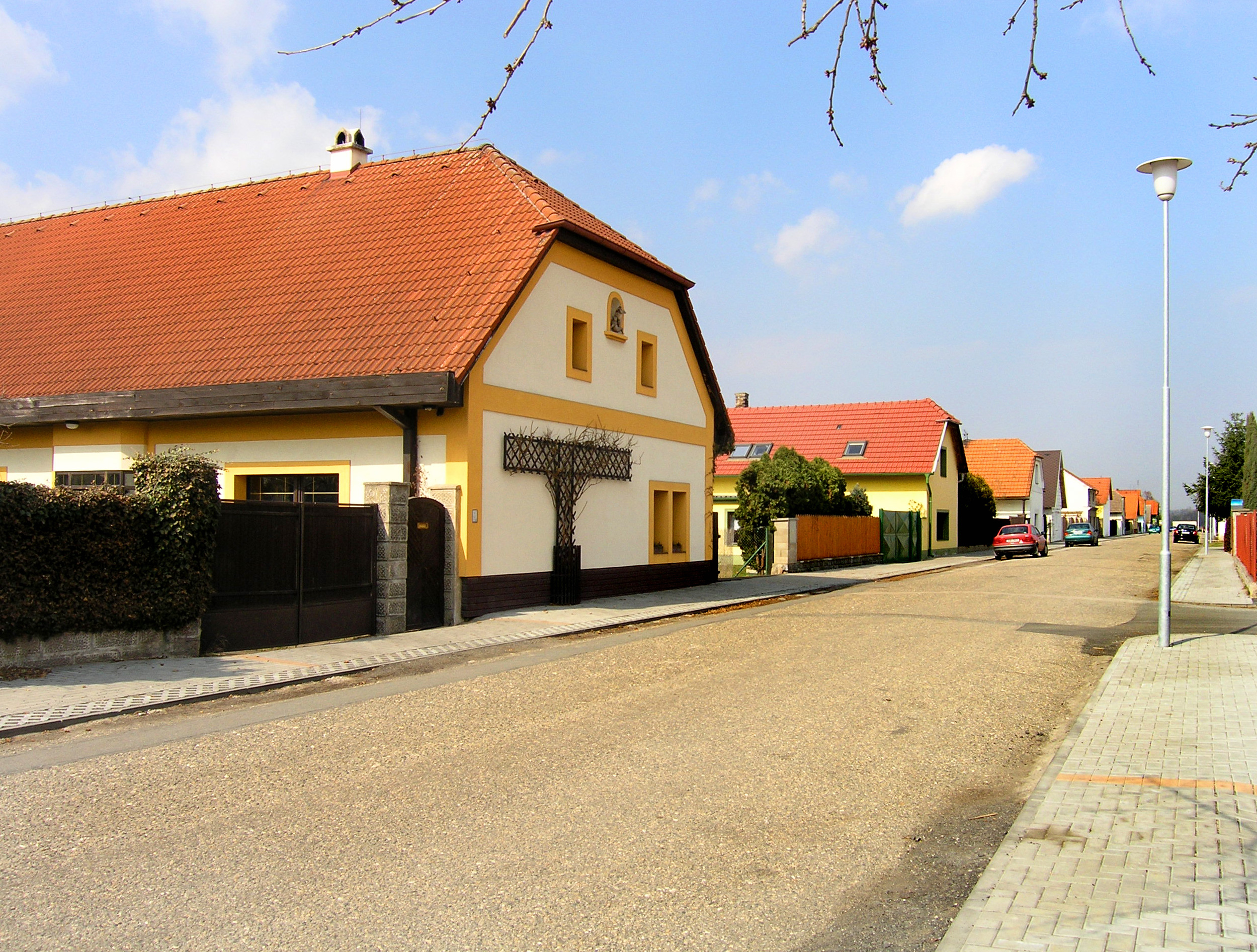
- Common in Borek

- Flag Coat of arms

- Location in the Czech Republic
- Coordinates: 50°13′21″N 14°38′50″E
- Country: Czech Republic
- Region: Central Bohemian
- District: Prague-East
- Founded: 1777

Area
  - Total: 2.99 km^{2} (1.15 sq mi)
- Elevation: 171 m (561 ft)

Population (2026-01-01)
  - Total: 349
  - Density: 117/km^{2} (302/sq mi)
- Time zone: UTC+1 (CET)
  - Summer (DST): UTC+2 (CEST)
- Postal code: 277 14
- Website: www.obecborek.cz

Borek is a municipality and village in Prague-East District in the Central Bohemian Region of the Czech Republic. It has about 300 inhabitants.

== Etymology ==
Borek is a common name of Czech settlements. The name is a diminutive of the Czech word bor (i.e. 'pine forest') and indicates that the settlement was established on or near the site of such forest.

== Geography ==
Borek is located about 16 km (10 mi) northeast of Prague. It lies in a flat landscape in the Central Elbe Table. The municipality is situated on the right bank of the Elbe River. The area is rich in oxbow lakes.

== History ==
Borek was founded in 1777. Between 1785 and 1848, the village was part of Křenek. Since 1848, it has been a separate municipality.

== Demographics ==
Historical population

Year	Pop.	±%
1869	125	—
1880	123	−1.6%
1890	132	+7.3%
1900	123	−6.8%
1910	131	+6.5%

Year	Pop.	±%
1921	147	+12.2%
1930	159	+8.2%
1950	158	−0.6%
1961	174	+10.1%
1970	187	+7.5%

Year	Pop.	±%
1980	181	−3.2%
1991	151	−16.6%
2001	169	+11.9%
2011	310	+83.4%
2021	345	+11.3%

Source: Censuses

== Transport ==
There are no railways or major roads passing through the municipality.

In the municipal territory is a small airport used for sport flying.

== Sights ==
There are no protected cultural monuments in the municipality.
