= Borik =

Borik may refer to:

- Borik, boʻrk, Central Asian male and female national headgear
- Borik, Banja Luka, a city neighbourhood in Bosnia and Herzegovina
- Borik, Croatia, a village near Mikleuš
- Bôrik (Žilina), a city neighbourhood in Slovakia
- Hotel Bôrik in Bratislava, Slovakia
- Otto Borik (born 1947), Czech-German chess player
