= Borek (name) =

Borek is a Czech surname and masculine given name, derived from the names Bořivoj, Ctibor, Lubor and the like. Notable people with the name include:

== Surname ==
- Ernest Borek (1911–1986), Hungarian-American microbiologist
- Scott Borek (born 1962), American ice hockey player and coach
- Tomáš Borek (born 1986), Czech football player

== Given name ==
- Borek Sedlák (born 1981), Czech ski jumper
- Borek Zakouřil (born 1976), Czech alpine skier

== See also ==
- Bořek, similar Czech name
