= Nezdice na Šumavě =

- Municipality
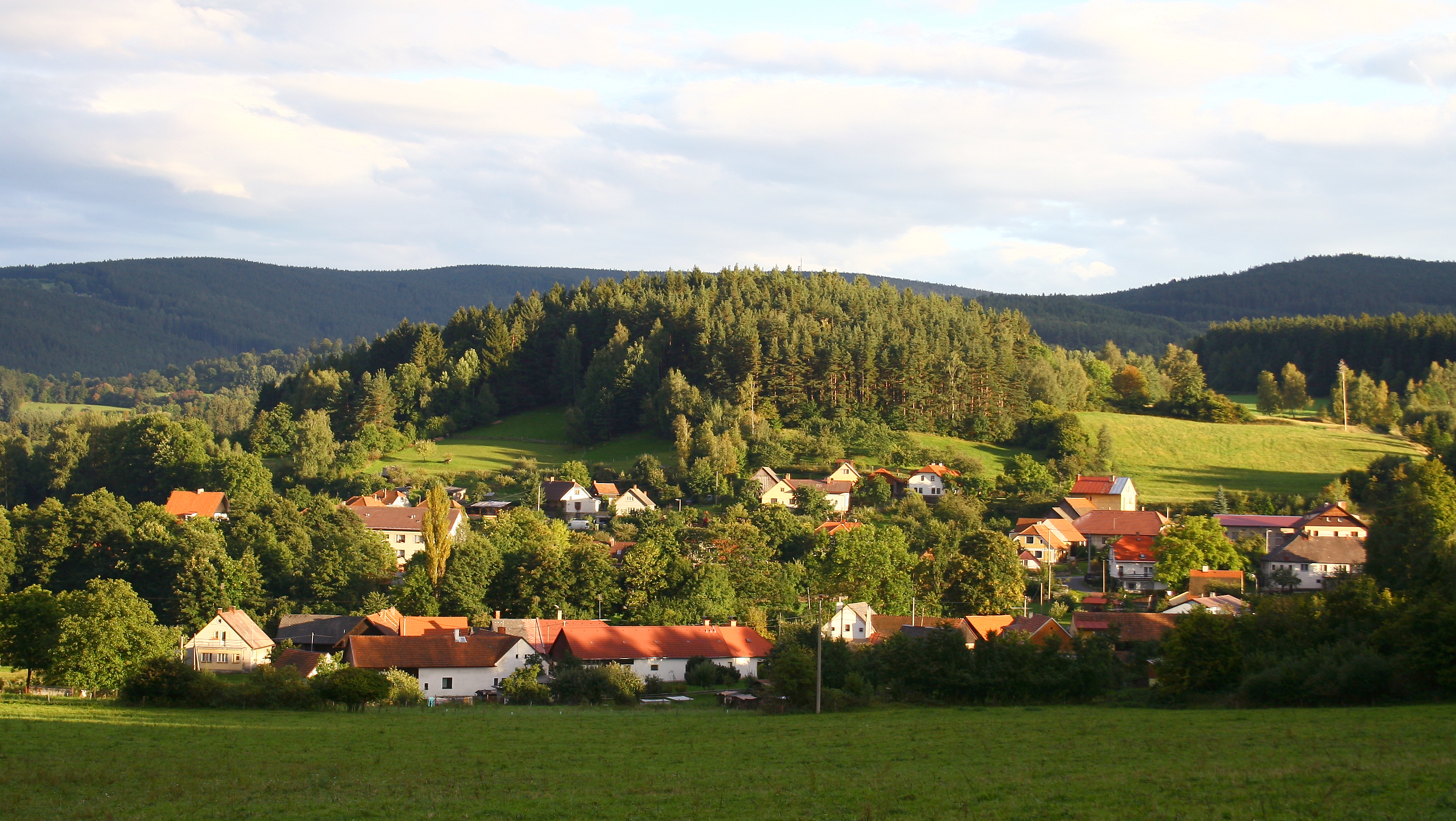
- Lower part of Nezdice na Šumavě

- Location in the Czech Republic
- Coordinates: 49°10′22″N 13°36′44″E
- Country: Czech Republic
- Region: Plzeň
- District: Klatovy
- First mentioned: 1396

Area
  - Total: 17.44 km^{2} (6.73 sq mi)
- Elevation: 638 m (2,093 ft)

Population (2026-01-01)
  - Total: 333
  - Density: 19.1/km^{2} (49.5/sq mi)
- Time zone: UTC+1 (CET)
  - Summer (DST): UTC+2 (CEST)
- Postal code: 342 01
- Website: www.nezdicenasumave.cz

Nezdice na Šumavě is a municipality and village in Klatovy District in the Plzeň Region of the Czech Republic. It has about 300 inhabitants.

Nezdice na Šumavě lies approximately 35 kilometres (22 mi) south-east of Klatovy, 67 km (42 mi) south of Plzeň, and 118 km (73 mi) south-west of Prague.

== Administrative division ==
Nezdice na Šumavě consists of four municipal parts (in brackets population according to the 2021 census):

- Nezdice na Šumavě (186)
- Ostružno (75)
- Pohorsko (62)
- Ždánov (0)

== History ==
The first written mention of Nezdice na Šumavě is from 1396.

== Demographics ==
Historical population
Year	Pop.	±%
1869	1,778	—
1880	1,930	+8.5%
1890	2,056	+6.5%
1900	2,036	−1.0%
1910	2,075	+1.9%
1921	2,083	+0.4%
1930	1,907	−8.4%
1950	1,074	−43.7%
1961	1,036	−3.5%
1970	871	−15.9%
1980	641	−26.4%
1991	498	−22.3%
2001	393	−21.1%
2011	296	−24.7%
2021	323	+9.1%
Source: Censuses
