= Skuhrov (Havlíčkův Brod District) =

- Municipality
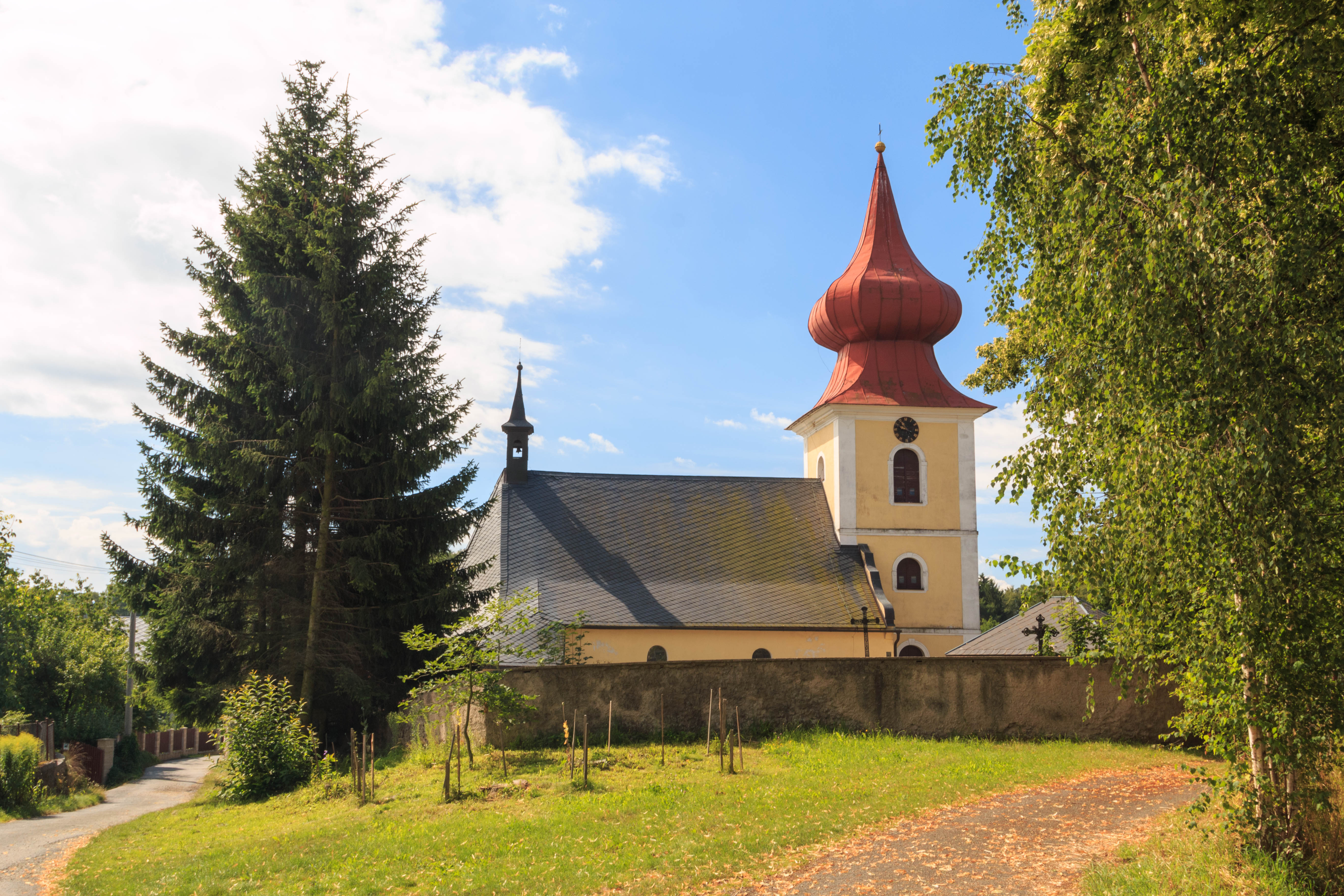
- Church of Saint Nicholas

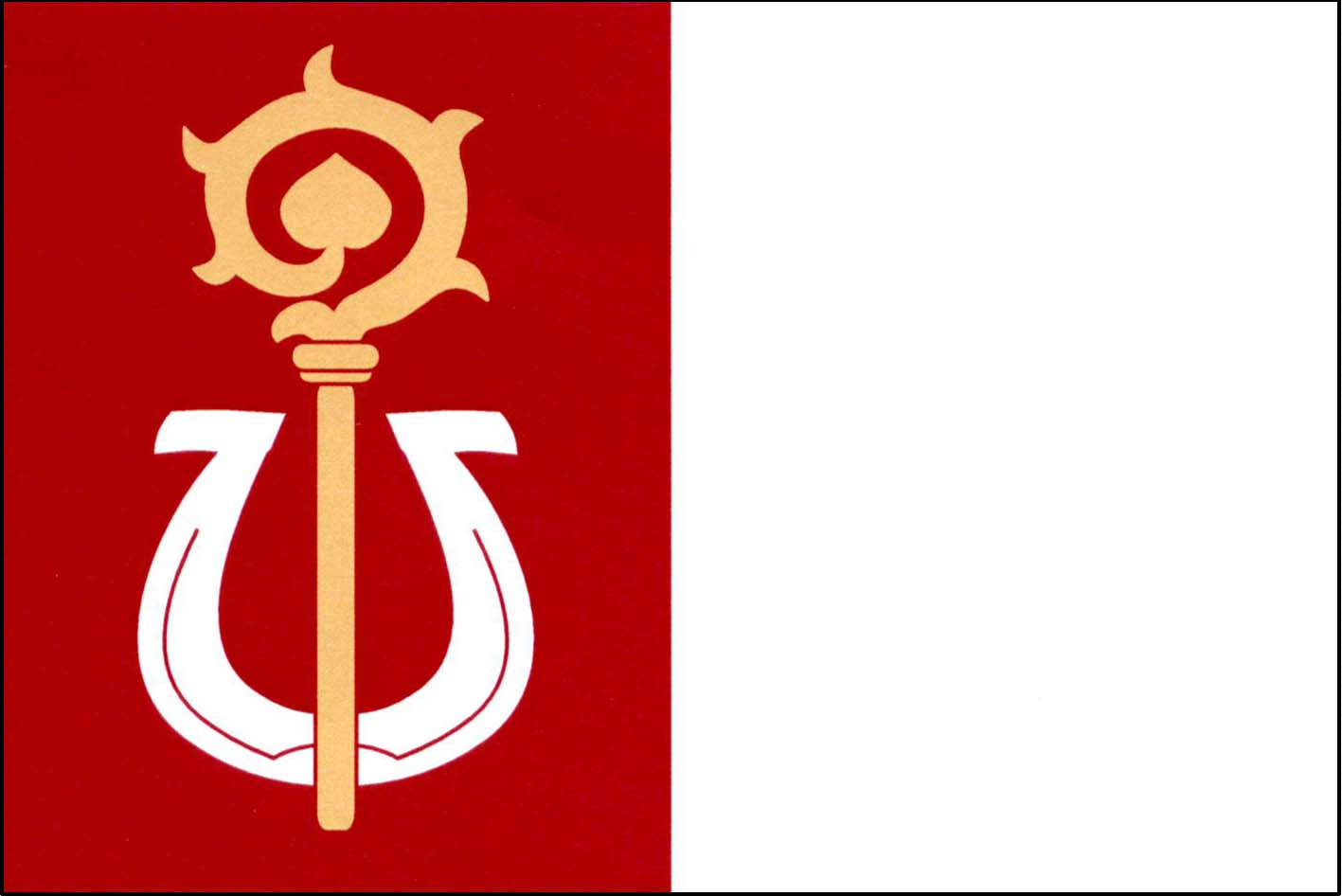
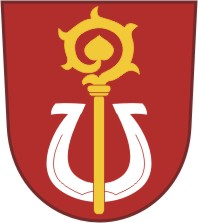
- Flag Coat of arms

- Location in the Czech Republic
- Coordinates: 49°41′5″N 15°31′56″E
- Country: Czech Republic
- Region: Vysočina
- District: Havlíčkův Brod
- First mentioned: 1352

Area
  - Total: 4.99 km^{2} (1.93 sq mi)
- Elevation: 502 m (1,647 ft)

Population (2026-01-01)
  - Total: 320
  - Density: 64/km^{2} (170/sq mi)
- Time zone: UTC+1 (CET)
  - Summer (DST): UTC+2 (CEST)
- Postal code: 582 41
- Website: www.skuhrov-hb.cz

Skuhrov is a municipality and village in Havlíčkův Brod District in the Vysočina Region of the Czech Republic. It has about 300 inhabitants.

Skuhrov lies approximately 10 kilometres (6 mi) north of Havlíčkův Brod, 33 km (21 mi) north of Jihlava, and 91 km (57 mi) south-east of Prague.

== Demographics ==
Historical population
Year	Pop.	±%
1869	362	—
1880	374	+3.3%
1890	346	−7.5%
1900	341	−1.4%
1910	371	+8.8%
1921	341	−8.1%
1930	314	−7.9%
1950	285	−9.2%
1961	313	+9.8%
1970	293	−6.4%
1980	251	−14.3%
1991	259	+3.2%
2001	249	−3.9%
2011	251	+0.8%
2021	290	+15.5%
Source: Censuses
