= Hotel Bôrik =

Government facility in Bratislava, Slovakia

Coordinates: 48.1488°N 17.0828°E

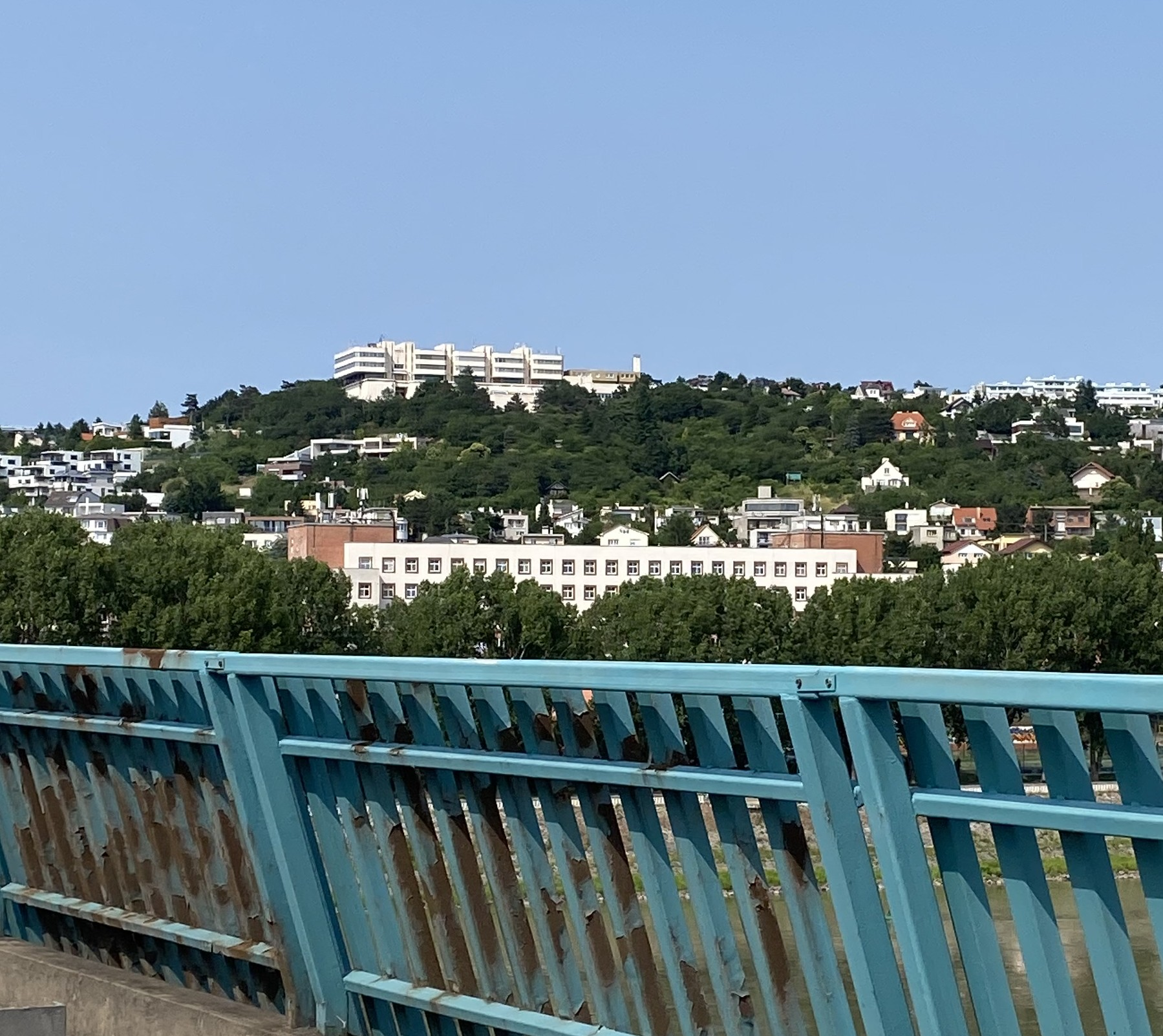
Hotel Bôrik viewed from Lanfranconi Bridge

Hotel Bôrik is a government facility in Bratislava, Slovakia. It is not a commercial hotel, but rather a venue for government-related guests, gatherings and events.

== Overview ==
The facility was projected in 1967 on a prominent hilltop site overlooking the Danube, west of Bratislava Castle. Its architects were Štefan Svetko and Štefan Ďurkovič, with participation of S. Talaš in the original project. It was completed in 1973. The building was intended for official use at the highest political level, and thus a locus of power of the Communist Party of Czechoslovakia and its affiliate Communist Party of Slovakia. It has been described as "the [Czechoslovak Communist] party's Bratislava hideaway".

The facility has hosted prestigious state guests, including Mikhail Gorbachev and Queen Elizabeth II.

== See also ==
- Stalinist architecture
