= Počepice =

- Municipality
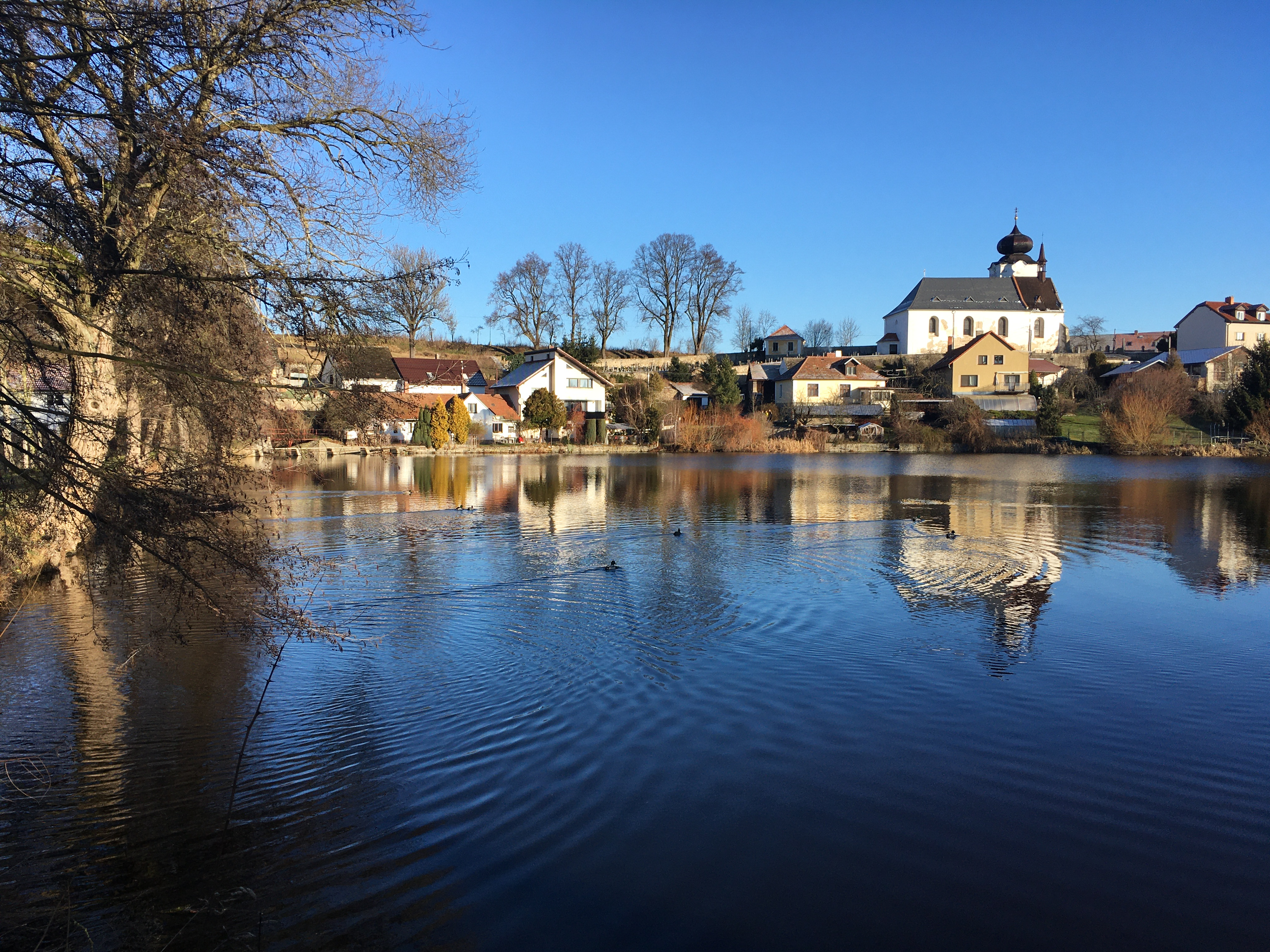
- Church of Saint John the Baptist behind a pond

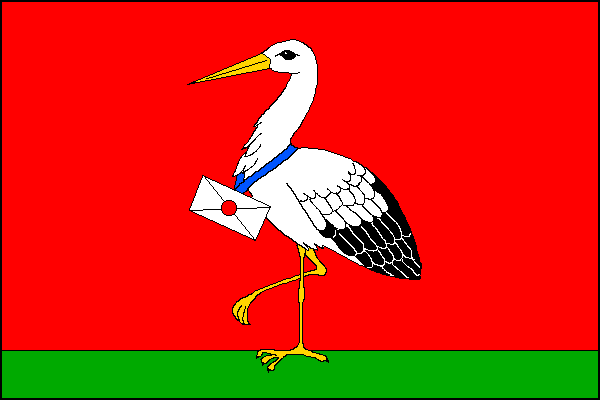
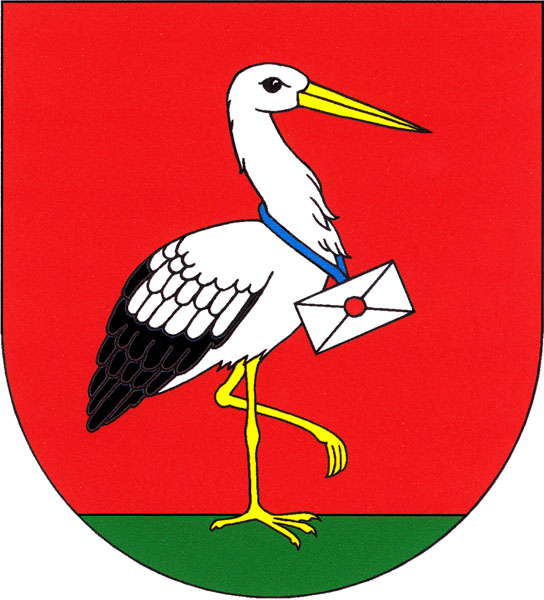
- Flag Coat of arms

- Location in the Czech Republic
- Coordinates: 49°35′46″N 14°22′51″E
- Country: Czech Republic
- Region: Central Bohemian
- District: Příbram
- First mentioned: 1219

Area
  - Total: 13.20 km^{2} (5.10 sq mi)
- Elevation: 441 m (1,447 ft)

Population (2026-01-01)
  - Total: 549
  - Density: 41.6/km^{2} (108/sq mi)
- Time zone: UTC+1 (CET)
  - Summer (DST): UTC+2 (CEST)
- Postal code: 262 55
- Website: www.pocepice.cz

Počepice is a municipality and village in Příbram District in the Central Bohemian Region of the Czech Republic. It has about 500 inhabitants.

== Administrative division ==
Počepice consists of five municipal parts (in brackets population according to the 2021 census):

- Počepice (289)
- Oukřtalov (9)
- Rovina (148)
- Skuhrov (34)
- Vitín (42)

== Etymology ==
The name is derived from the personal name Počap, meaning "the village of Počap's people". The letter 'a' in the original name was distorted to 'e'.

== Geography ==
Počepice is located about 29 kilometres (18 mi) east of Příbram and 49 km (30 mi) south of Prague. It lies in the Benešov Uplands. The highest point is at 573 m (1,880 ft) above sea level. The stream Počepický potok flows through the municipality. There are several fishponds in the municipal territory.

== History ==
The first written mention of Počepice is in a deed of King Ottokar I from 1219.

== Demographics ==
Historical population

Year	Pop.	±%
1869	1,421	—
1880	1,297	−8.7%
1890	1,258	−3.0%
1900	1,142	−9.2%
1910	1,077	−5.7%

Year	Pop.	±%
1921	1,062	−1.4%
1930	940	−11.5%
1950	705	−25.0%
1961	676	−4.1%
1970	657	−2.8%

Year	Pop.	±%
1980	570	−13.2%
1991	480	−15.8%
2001	498	+3.8%
2011	507	+1.8%
2021	522	+3.0%

Source: Censuses

== Transport ==
There are no railways or major roads passing through the municipality.

== Sights ==
The main landmark of Počepice is the Church of Saint John the Baptist. It was originally an early Gothic church from the turn of the 13th and 14th centuries. In the second half of the 16th century or early 17th century, it was rebuilt in the late Renaissance style. In 1790, it was extended and rebuilt in the late Baroque style. The presbytery and nave contain valuable Renaissance heraldic paintings.
