= Borek (Pardubice District) =

- Municipality
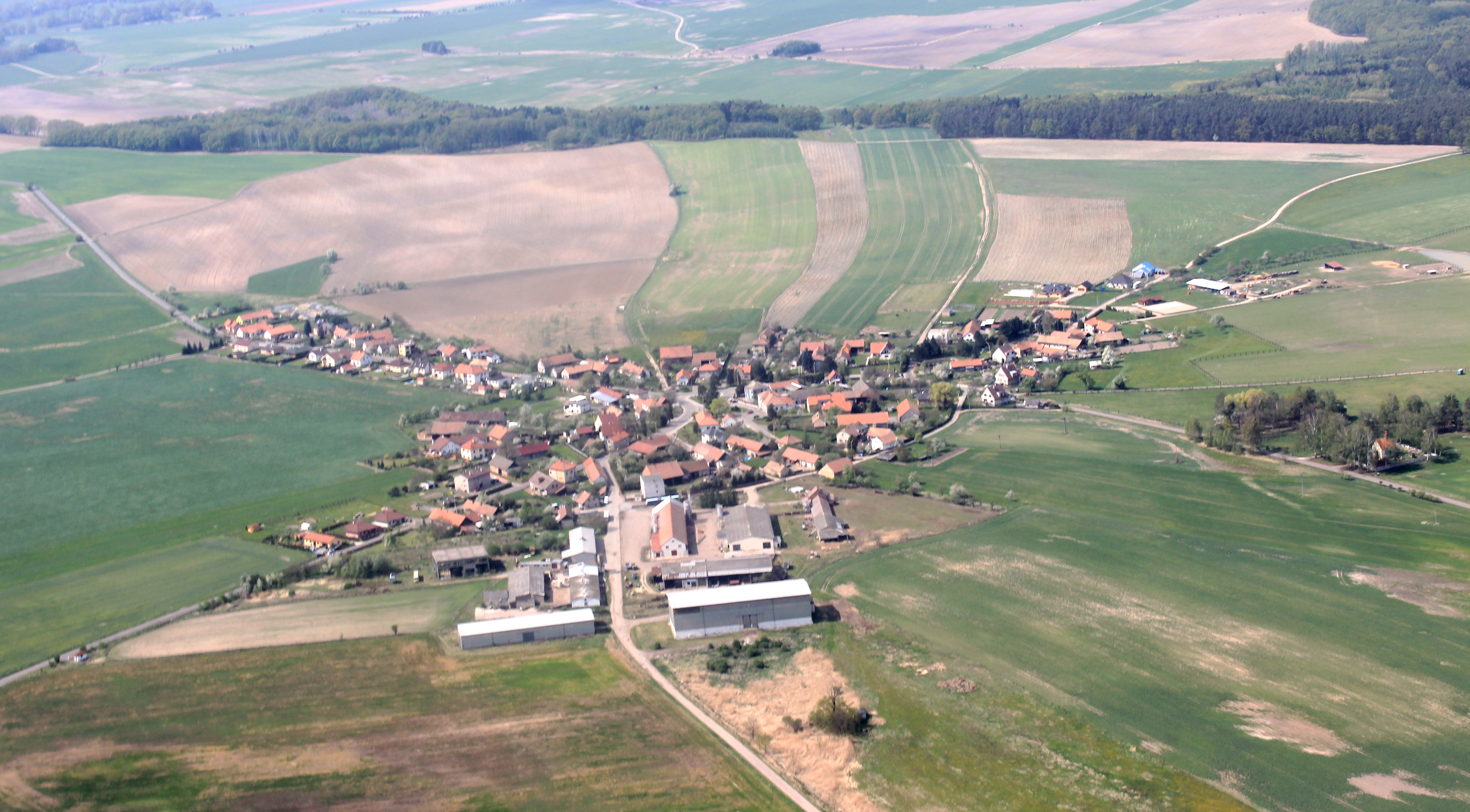
- Aerial view

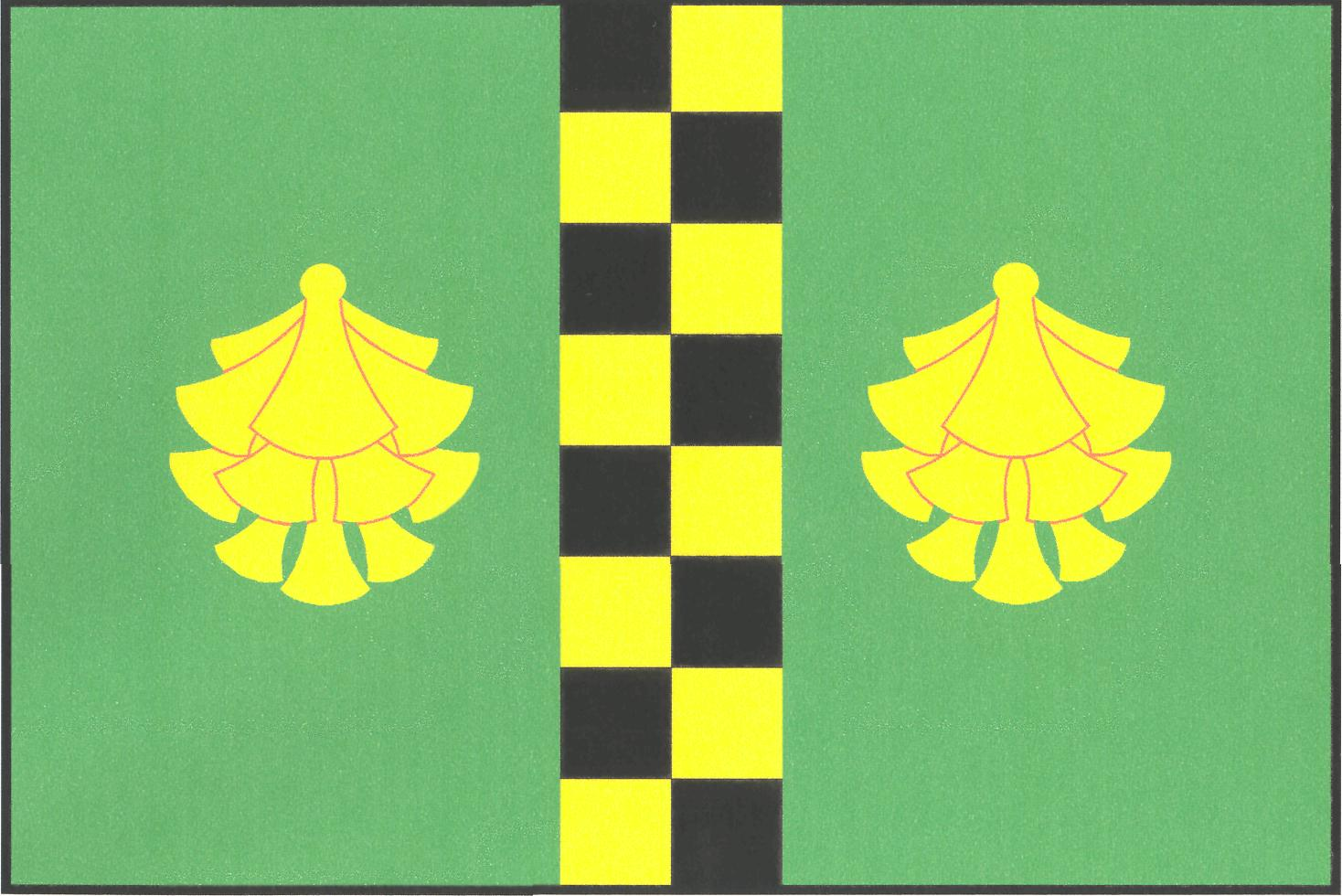
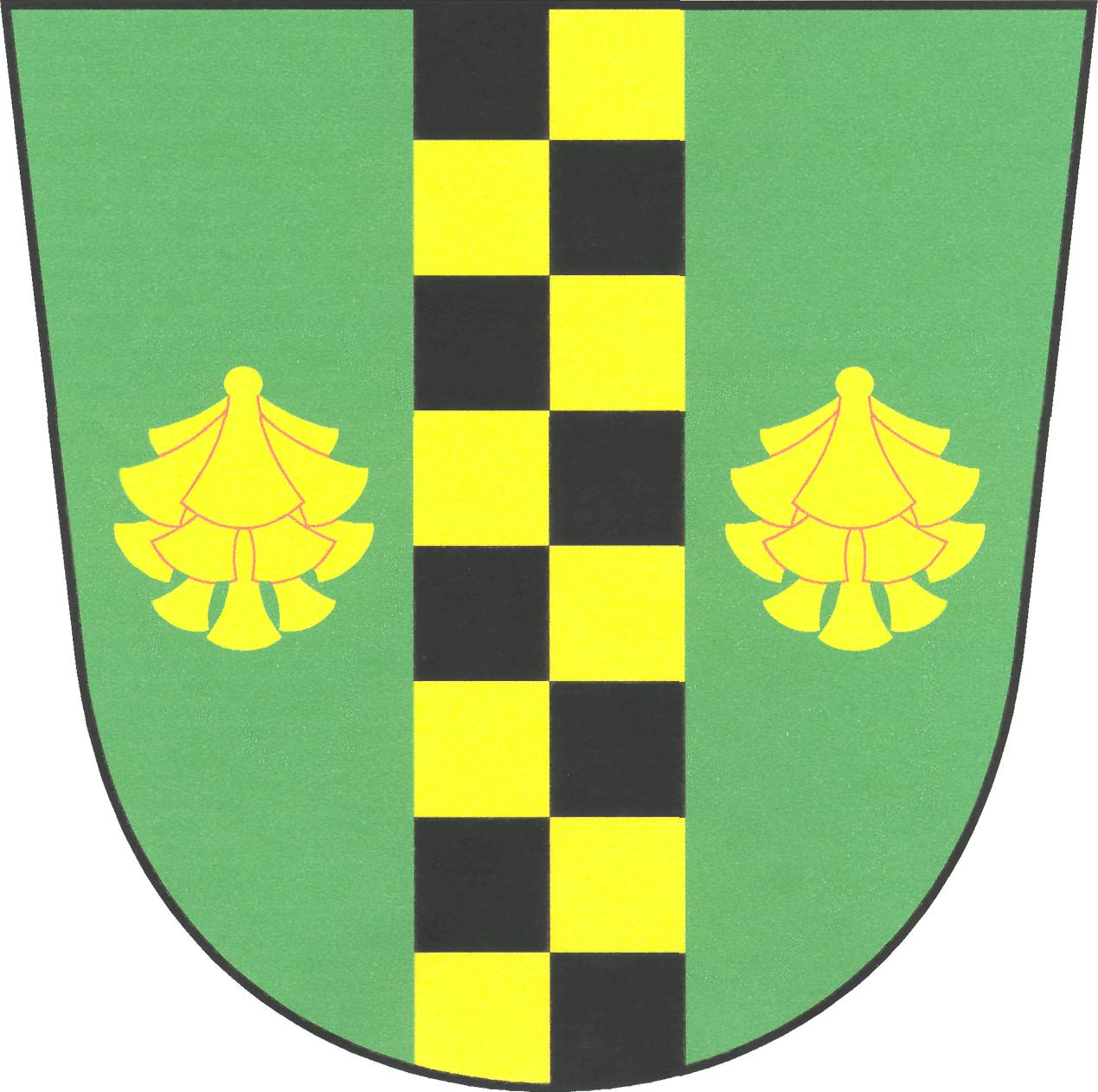
- Flag Coat of arms

- Location in the Czech Republic
- Coordinates: 50°7′38″N 15°51′24″E
- Country: Czech Republic
- Region: Pardubice
- District: Pardubice
- First mentioned: 1436

Area
  - Total: 5.22 km^{2} (2.02 sq mi)
- Elevation: 245 m (804 ft)

Population (2026-01-01)
  - Total: 288
  - Density: 55.2/km^{2} (143/sq mi)
- Time zone: UTC+1 (CET)
  - Summer (DST): UTC+2 (CEST)
- Postal code: 534 01
- Website: www.obec-borek.eu

Borek is a municipality and village in Pardubice District in the Pardubice Region of the Czech Republic. It has about 300 inhabitants.

== Etymology ==
Borek is a common name of Czech settlements. The name is a diminutive of the word bor (i.e. 'pine forest') and indicates that the settlement was established on or near the site of such forest.

== Geography ==
Borek is located about 11 kilometres (7 mi) north of Pardubice and 7 km (4 mi) south of Hradec Králové. It lies mostly in the East Elbe Table, only the northern part of the municipality extends into the Orlice Table.

== History ==
The first written mention of Borek is from 1436.

== Demographics ==
Historical population

Year	Pop.	±%
1869	242	—
1880	297	+22.7%
1890	347	+16.8%
1900	294	−15.3%
1910	308	+4.8%

Year	Pop.	±%
1921	283	−8.1%
1930	265	−6.4%
1950	200	−24.5%
1961	207	+3.5%
1970	204	−1.4%

Year	Pop.	±%
1980	189	−7.4%
1991	194	+2.6%
2001	196	+1.0%
2011	248	+26.5%
2021	286	+15.3%

Source: Censuses

== Transport ==
The D35 motorway runs through the municipality.

== Sights ==
There are no protected cultural monuments in the municipality.
