= Bořek =

Bořek is a Czech masculine given name, derived from the name Bořivoj. Notable people with the name include:

- Bořek Dočkal (born 1988), Czech footballer
- Bořek Šípek (1949–2016), Czech architect and designer

== See also ==
- Borek (name), similar Czech name
