= Suchomasty =

- Municipality
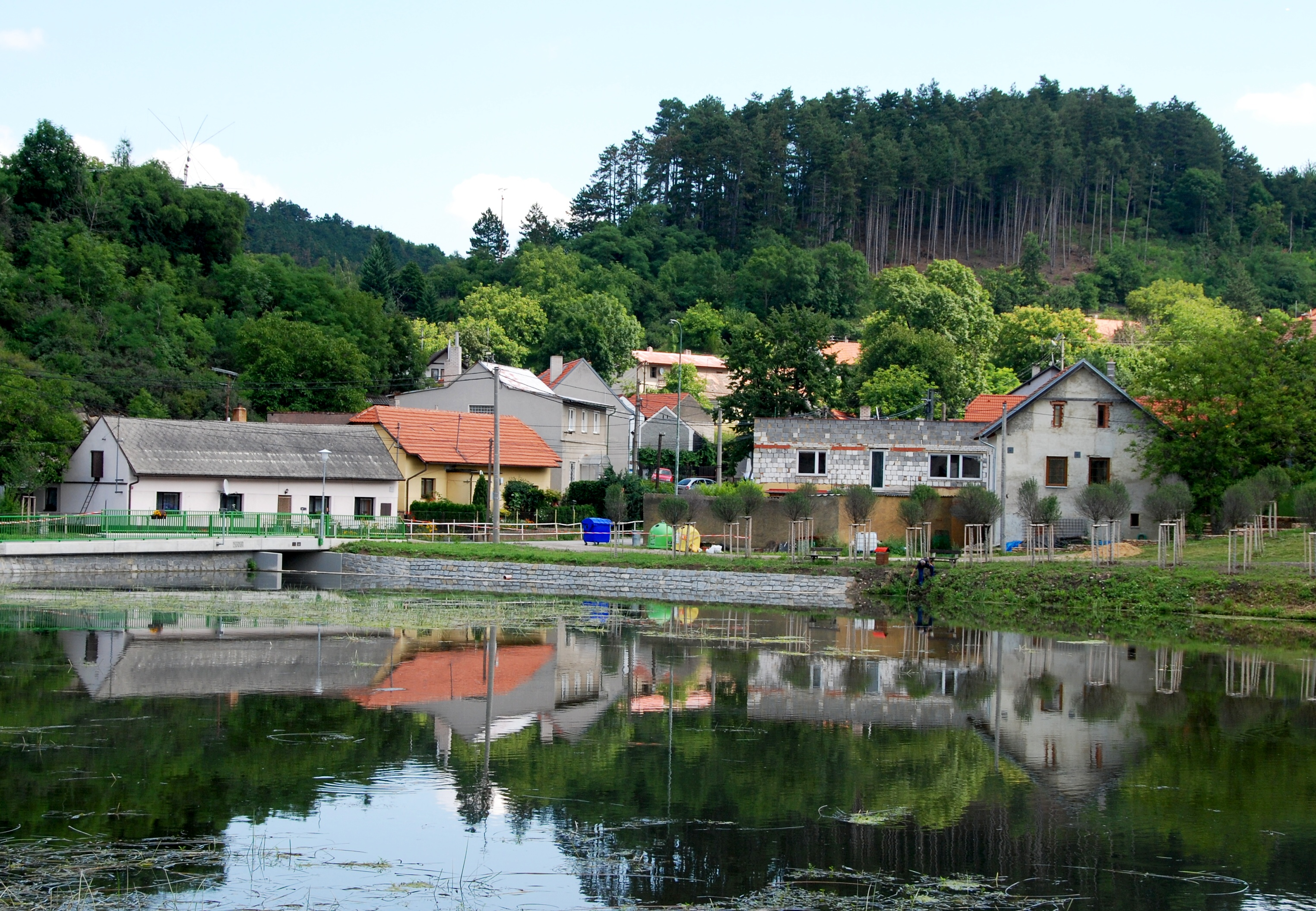
- Centre of Suchomasty

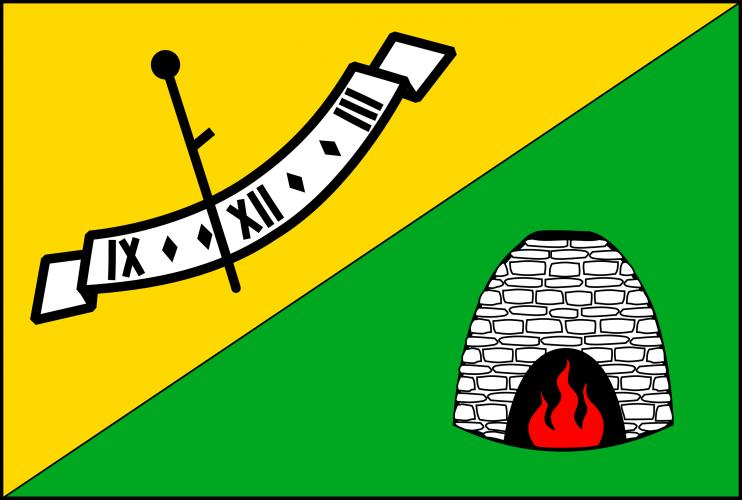
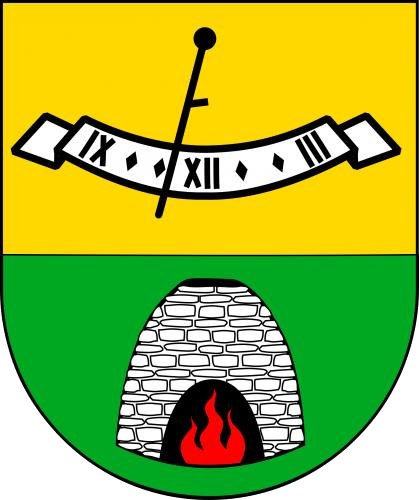
- Flag Coat of arms

- Location in the Czech Republic
- Coordinates: 49°53′44″N 14°3′24″E
- Country: Czech Republic
- Region: Central Bohemian
- District: Beroun
- First mentioned: 1088

Area
  - Total: 7.26 km^{2} (2.80 sq mi)
- Elevation: 350 m (1,150 ft)

Population (2026-01-01)
  - Total: 547
  - Density: 75.3/km^{2} (195/sq mi)
- Time zone: UTC+1 (CET)
  - Summer (DST): UTC+2 (CEST)
- Postal codes: 267 01, 267 22
- Website: www.suchomasty.cz

Suchomasty is a municipality and village in Beroun District in the Central Bohemian Region of the Czech Republic. It has about 500 inhabitants.

== Administrative division ==
Suchomasty consists of two municipal parts (in brackets population according to the 2021 census):

- Suchomasty (488)
- Borek (18)

== Etymology ==
In the oldest documents, the name Suchomasty appears as Suchomasli. The name originated as an allusion to the local residents who "insufficiently butter their bread" (Czech: suše máslí).

== Geography ==
Suchomasty is located about 7 kilometres (4 mi) south of Beroun and 27 km (17 mi) southwest of Prague. It lies in the Hořovice Uplands. The highest point is the hill Lejškov at 487 m (1,598 ft) above sea level. In the centre of the village is the fishpond Mlýnský rybník.

Half of the territory lies in the Bohemian Karst Protected Landscape Area, on the territory of which several small-scale protected areas are defined. The most important of them is the Klonk National Nature Monument, which is globally recognised as a geologically important location due to the presence of the Global Boundary Stratotype Section and Point marking the boundary between Silurian and Devonian periods. Other small-scale protected areas are the nature reserves Na Voskopě and Kobyla.

== History ==
The first written mention of Suchomasty is in a document from 1088, in which it is stated that Duke Vratislaus II gave the village of Suchomasty and two plow yards to the newly founded Vyšehrad Chapter. The owners of the village changed often and included various lesser noble families.

== Demographics ==
Historical population

Year	Pop.	±%
1869	640	—
1880	667	+4.2%
1890	622	−6.7%
1900	723	+16.2%
1910	773	+6.9%

Year	Pop.	±%
1921	753	−2.6%
1930	714	−5.2%
1950	572	−19.9%
1961	585	+2.3%
1970	572	−2.2%

Year	Pop.	±%
1980	555	−3.0%
1991	479	−13.7%
2001	466	−2.7%
2011	424	−9.0%
2021	506	+19.3%

Source: Censuses

== Transport ==
There are no railways or major roads passing through the municipality.

== Sights ==
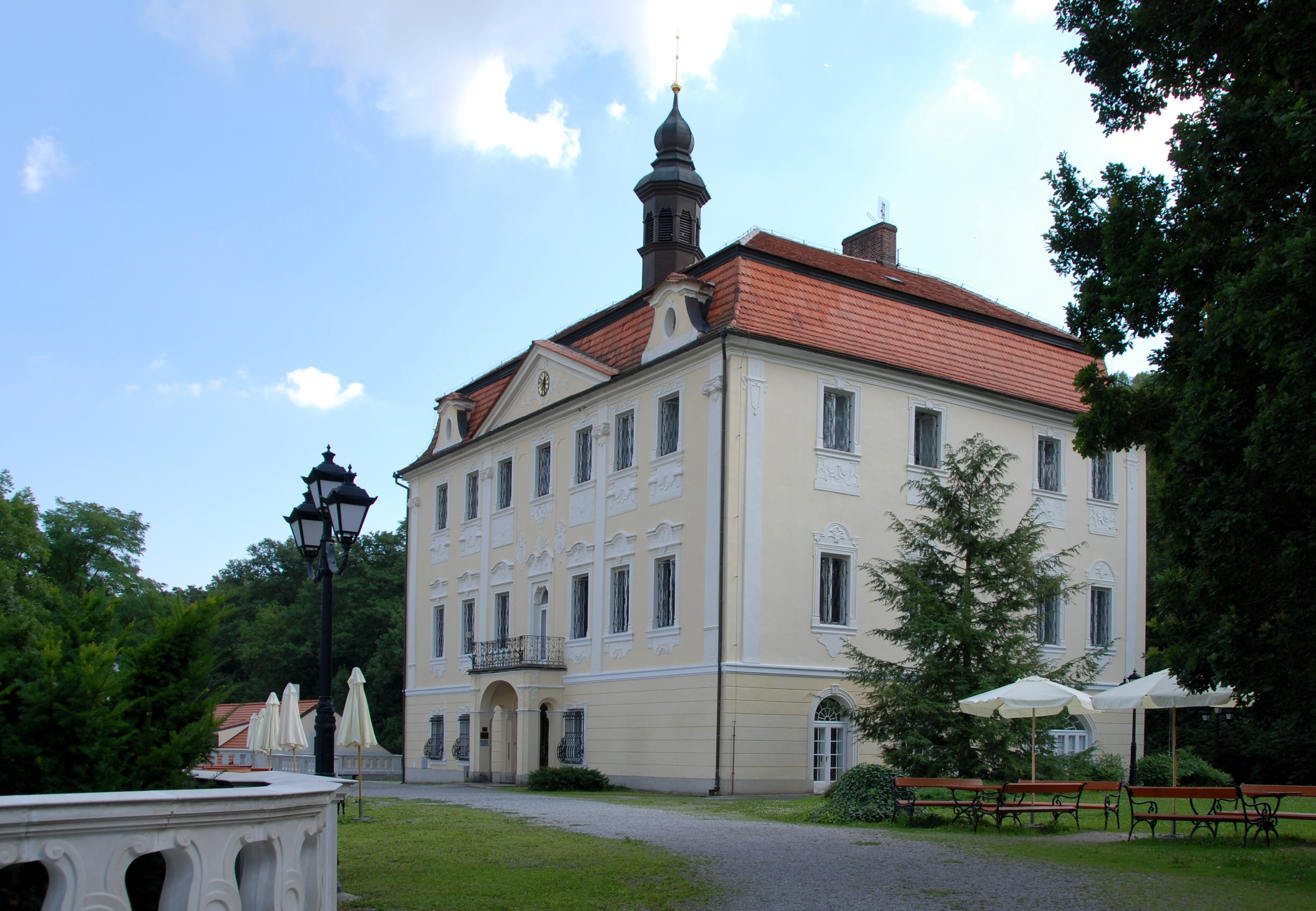
Suchomasty Castle

The most important monument is the Church of Saint Nicholas, located in Borek. It was originally a Gothic church, first mentioned in 1352. The church was rebuilt in the Baroque style in 1726. A valuable building is also the neighbouring late Baroque rectory from 1798. Near the church is a separate Baroque bell tower.

The Suchomasty Castle is a Renaissance castle, rebuilt in the late Baroque style in the 18th century. Today it houses an institute of social welfare.
