= Ostružná =

- Municipality
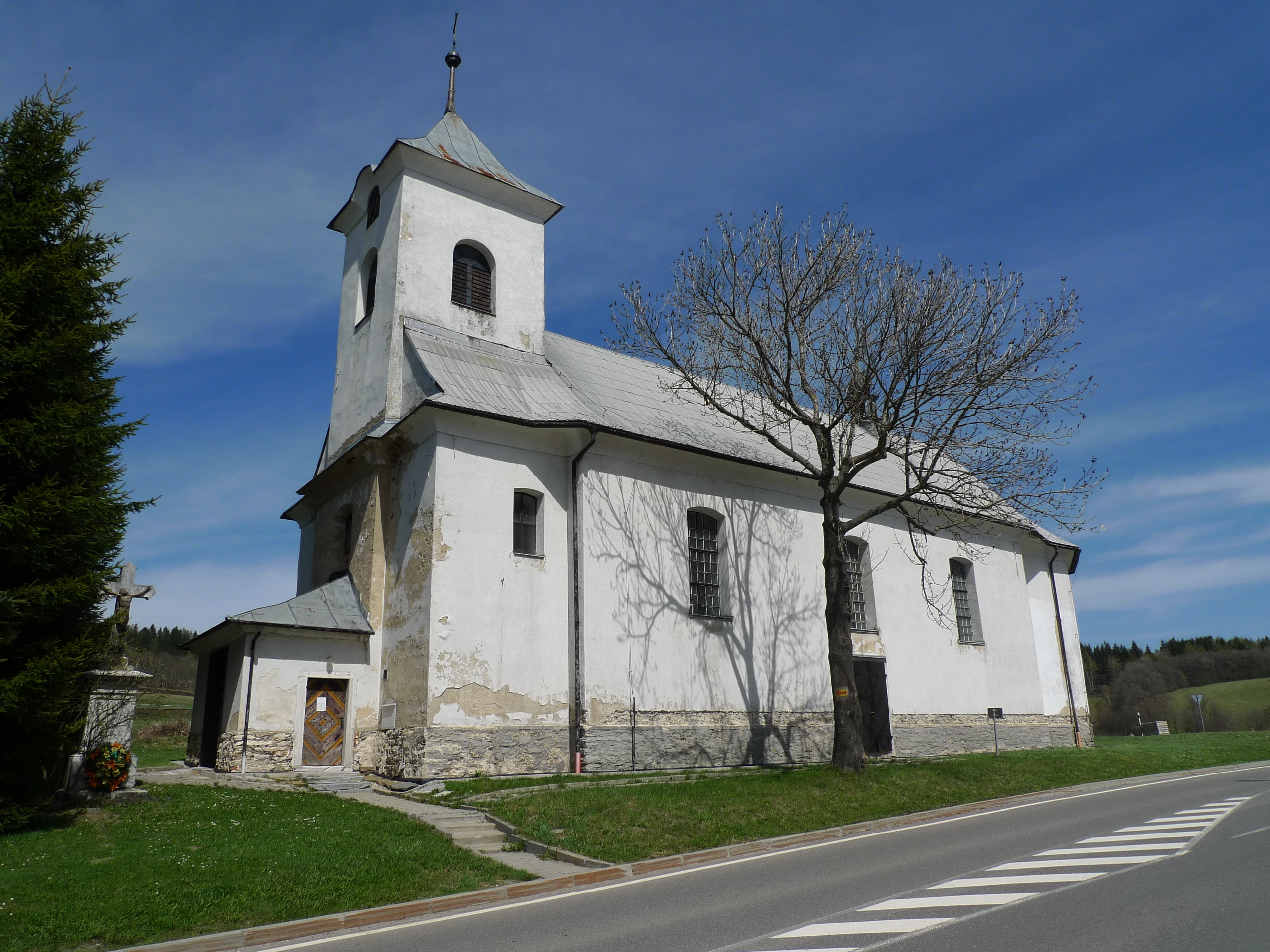
- Church of Three Kings

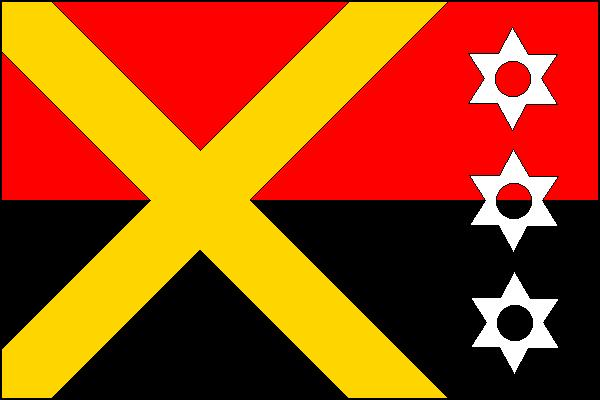
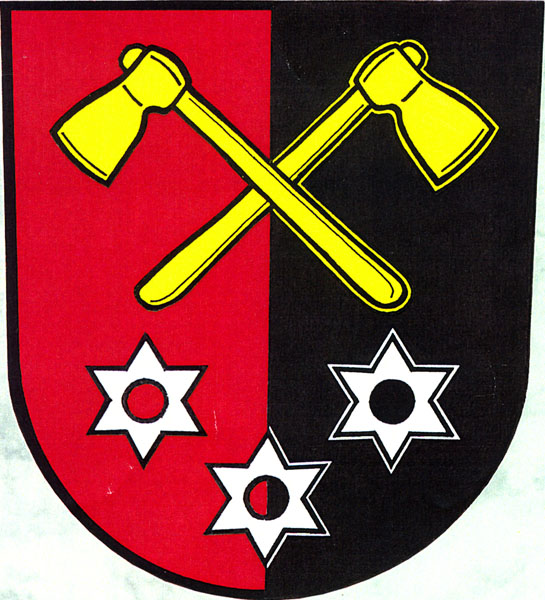
- Flag Coat of arms

- Location in the Czech Republic
- Coordinates: 50°11′6″N 17°3′6″E
- Country: Czech Republic
- Region: Olomouc
- District: Jeseník
- Founded: 1561

Area
  - Total: 25.08 km^{2} (9.68 sq mi)
- Elevation: 694 m (2,277 ft)

Population (2026-01-01)
  - Total: 171
  - Density: 6.82/km^{2} (17.7/sq mi)
- Time zone: UTC+1 (CET)
  - Summer (DST): UTC+2 (CEST)
- Postal code: 788 25
- Website: www.obecostruzna.cz

Ostružná (until 1918 Špornava; German: Spornhau) is a municipality and village in Jeseník District in the Olomouc Region of the Czech Republic. It has about 200 inhabitants.

Ostružná lies approximately 11 kilometres (7 mi) south-west of Jeseník, 67 km (42 mi) north of Olomouc, and 190 km (120 mi) east of Prague.

== Administrative division ==
Ostružná consists of three municipal parts (in brackets population according to the 2021 census):

- Ostružná (126)
- Petříkov (28)
- Ramzová (26)

== Demographics ==
Historical population
Year	Pop.	±%
1869	1,071	—
1880	998	−6.8%
1890	1,011	+1.3%
1900	947	−6.3%
1910	969	+2.3%
1921	874	−9.8%
1930	878	+0.5%
1950	403	−54.1%
1961	230	−42.9%
1970	195	−15.2%
1980	143	−26.7%
1991	123	−14.0%
2001	154	+25.2%
2011	181	+17.5%
2021	180	−0.6%
Source: Censuses

== Sport ==
The Petříkov ski resort is located in the municipality.
