= Košice (Tábor District) =

- Municipality
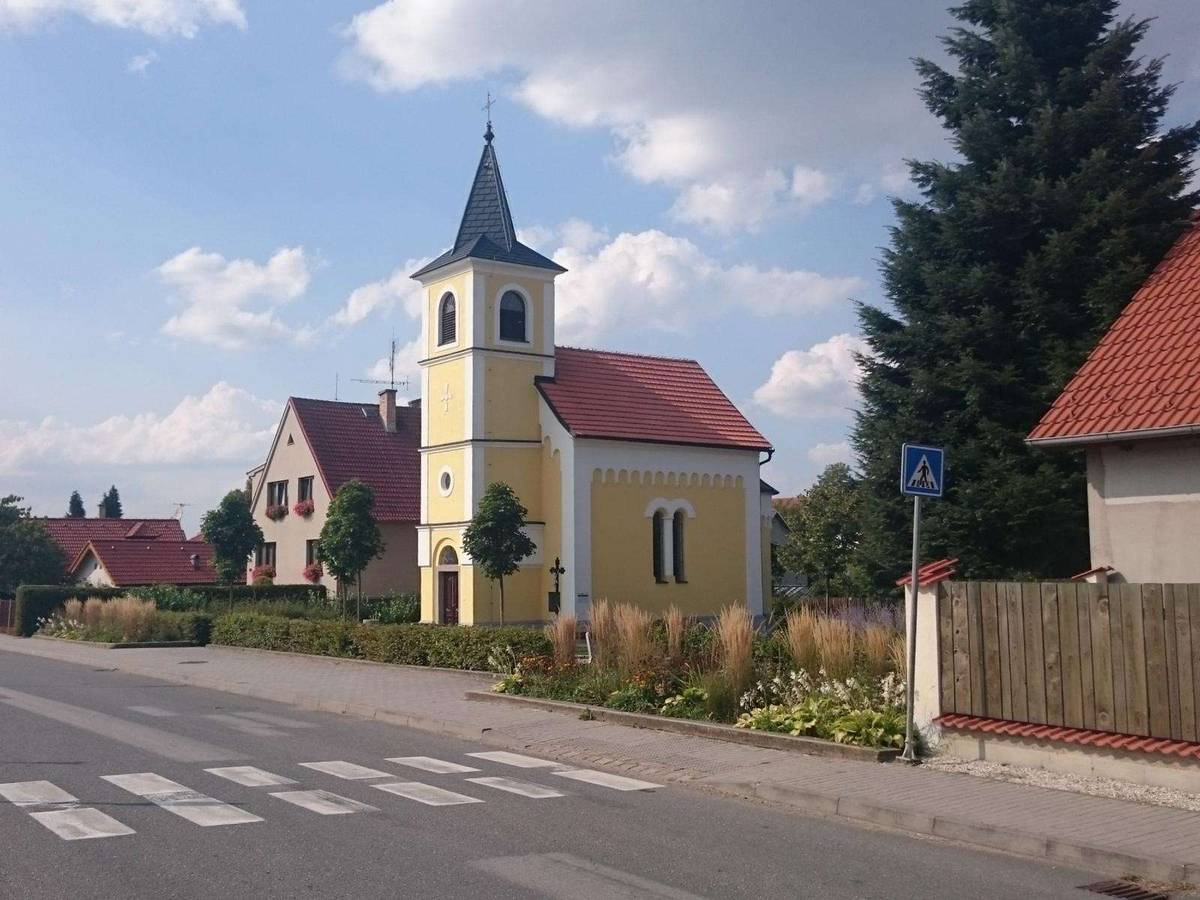
- Chapel of Saint Anne

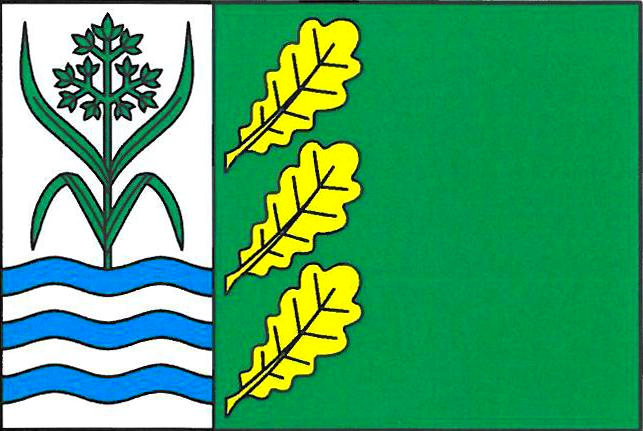
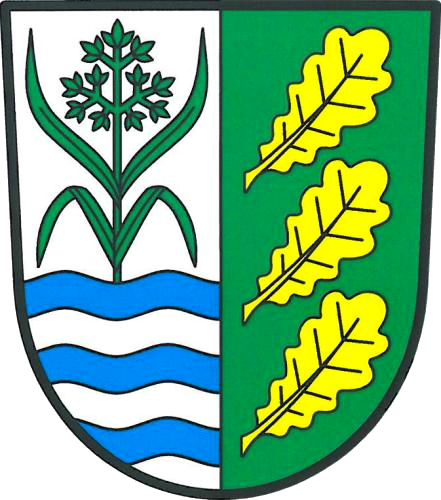
- Flag Coat of arms

- Location in the Czech Republic
- Coordinates: 49°19′31″N 14°45′5″E
- Country: Czech Republic
- Region: South Bohemian
- District: Tábor
- First mentioned: 1252

Area
  - Total: 13.99 km^{2} (5.40 sq mi)
- Elevation: 450 m (1,480 ft)

Population (2026-01-01)
  - Total: 773
  - Density: 55.3/km^{2} (143/sq mi)
- Time zone: UTC+1 (CET)
  - Summer (DST): UTC+2 (CEST)
- Postal code: 391 17
- Website: www.obeckosice.cz

Košice is a municipality and village in Tábor District in the South Bohemian Region of the Czech Republic. It has about 800 inhabitants.

== Administrative division ==
Košice consists of three municipal parts (in brackets population according to the 2021 census):

- Košice (678)
- Borek (4)
- Doubí (70)

== Etymology ==
The name Košice is derived from the personal name Koš, Koša or Koch, meaning "the village of Koš's/Koša's/Koch's people".

== Geography ==
Košice is located about 11 kilometres (7 mi) southeast of Tábor and 43 km (27 mi) northeast of České Budějovice. Most of the municipality (including the Košice village) lies in the Křemešník Highlands. The northern and western part of the municipality (including the Doubí and Borek villages) extends into the Tábor Uplands. The highest point is at 519 m (1,703 ft) above sea level. The Lužnice River flows along the western municipal border. There are several small fishponds in the territory of Košice.

== History ==
The first written mention of Košice is from 1252. Until 1454, the village belonged to the Choustník estate, then it was annexed to the Brandlín estate. In 1547–1594, Košice was owned by the town of Tábor. After that, the owners changed frequently.

== Demographics ==
Historical population

Year	Pop.	±%
1869	944	—
1880	947	+0.3%
1890	948	+0.1%
1900	956	+0.8%
1910	963	+0.7%

Year	Pop.	±%
1921	940	−2.4%
1930	872	−7.2%
1950	751	−13.9%
1961	764	+1.7%
1970	730	−4.5%

Year	Pop.	±%
1980	732	+0.3%
1991	697	−4.8%
2001	698	+0.1%
2011	726	+4.0%
2021	752	+3.6%

Source: Censuses

== Transport ==
The D3 motorway (part of the European route E55) from České Budějovice to Tábor runs through the municipality.

The village of Doubí (the railway station Doubí u Tábora) is located on the České Budějovice–Tábor railway line.

== Sights ==
The only protected cultural monument in the municipality is the rural house No. 2. It is an example of local folk architecture, built in the 19th century. The current appearance of the house dates from the mid-20th century.

The main landmark of Košice is the Chapel of Saint Anne. It was built in 1884.
