= Borek (Jičín District) =

- Municipality
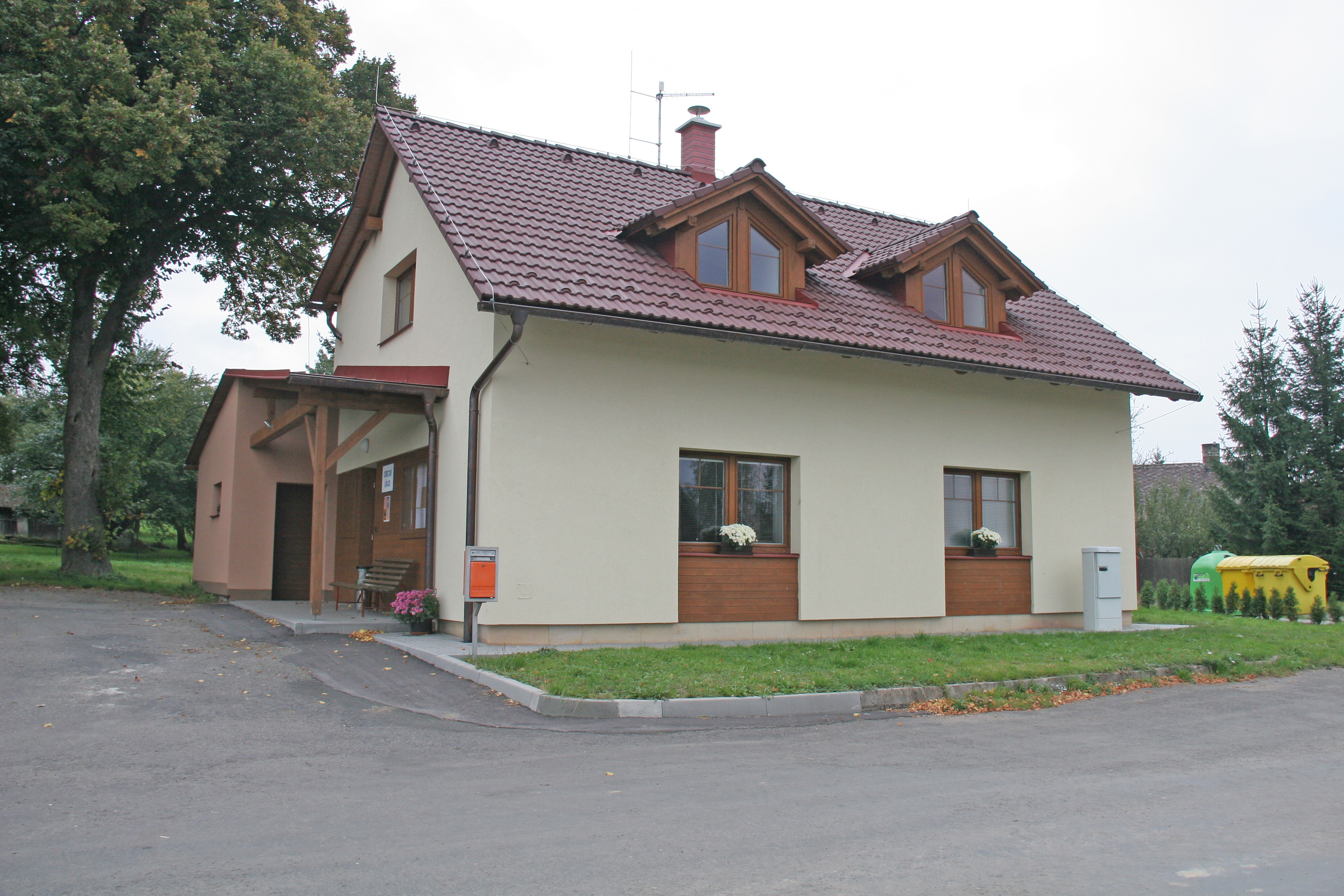
- Municipal office

- Location in the Czech Republic
- Coordinates: 50°26′20″N 15°39′16″E
- Country: Czech Republic
- Region: Hradec Králové
- District: Jičín
- First mentioned: 1267

Area
  - Total: 6.38 km^{2} (2.46 sq mi)
- Elevation: 479 m (1,572 ft)

Population (2026-01-01)
  - Total: 95
  - Density: 15/km^{2} (39/sq mi)
- Time zone: UTC+1 (CET)
  - Summer (DST): UTC+2 (CEST)
- Postal code: 507 71
- Website: borekumiletina.cz

Borek is a municipality and village in Jičín District in the Hradec Králové Region of the Czech Republic. It has about 100 inhabitants.

== Administrative division ==
Borek consists of three municipal parts (in brackets population according to the 2021 census):

- Borek (42)
- Bezník (34)
- Želejov (23)

== Demographics ==
Historical population
Year	Pop.	±%
1869	417	—
1880	426	+2.2%
1890	400	−6.1%
1900	368	−8.0%
1910	376	+2.2%
1921	332	−11.7%
1930	293	−11.7%
1950	198	−32.4%
1961	182	−8.1%
1970	128	−29.7%
1980	118	−7.8%
1991	97	−17.8%
2001	102	+5.2%
2011	93	−8.8%
2021	99	+6.5%
Source: Censuses
