= Ostružno (Jičín District) =

- Municipality
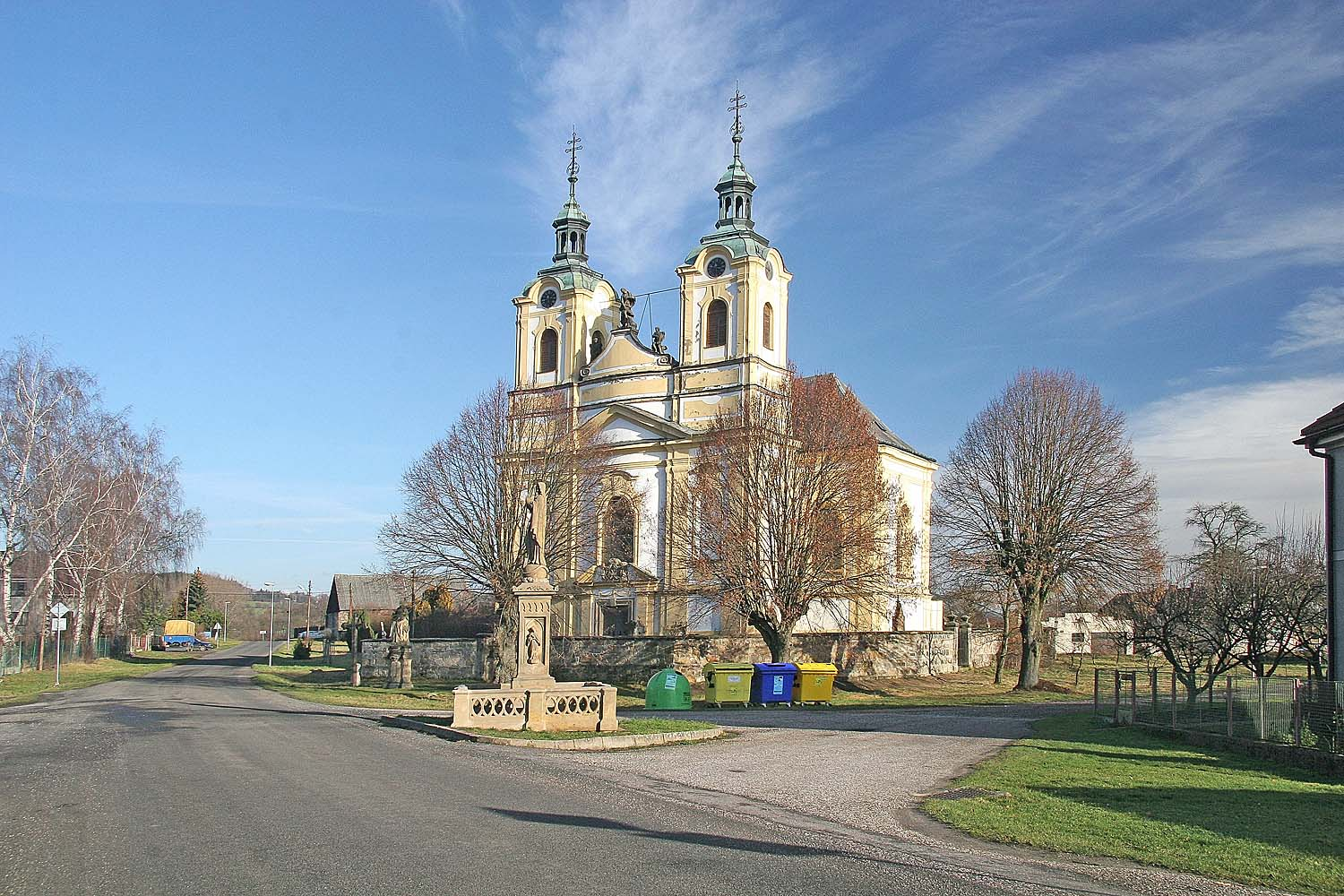
- Church of the Exaltation of the Holy Cross

- Location in the Czech Republic
- Coordinates: 50°26′36″N 15°17′23″E
- Country: Czech Republic
- Region: Hradec Králové
- District: Jičín
- First mentioned: 1227

Area
  - Total: 4.35 km^{2} (1.68 sq mi)
- Elevation: 286 m (938 ft)

Population (2026-01-01)
  - Total: 104
  - Density: 23.9/km^{2} (61.9/sq mi)
- Time zone: UTC+1 (CET)
  - Summer (DST): UTC+2 (CEST)
- Postal code: 506 01
- Website: www.ostruzno.cz

Ostružno is a municipality and village in Jičín District in the Hradec Králové Region of the Czech Republic. It has about 100 inhabitants.

== Demographics ==
Historical population
Year	Pop.	±%
1869	322	—
1880	273	−15.2%
1890	277	+1.5%
1900	294	+6.1%
1910	274	−6.8%
1921	229	−16.4%
1930	233	+1.7%
1950	164	−29.6%
1961	128	−22.0%
1970	113	−11.7%
1980	107	−5.3%
1991	99	−7.5%
2001	77	−22.2%
2011	85	+10.4%
2021	103	+21.2%
Source: Censuses
