= Borek (Havlíčkův Brod District) =

- Municipality
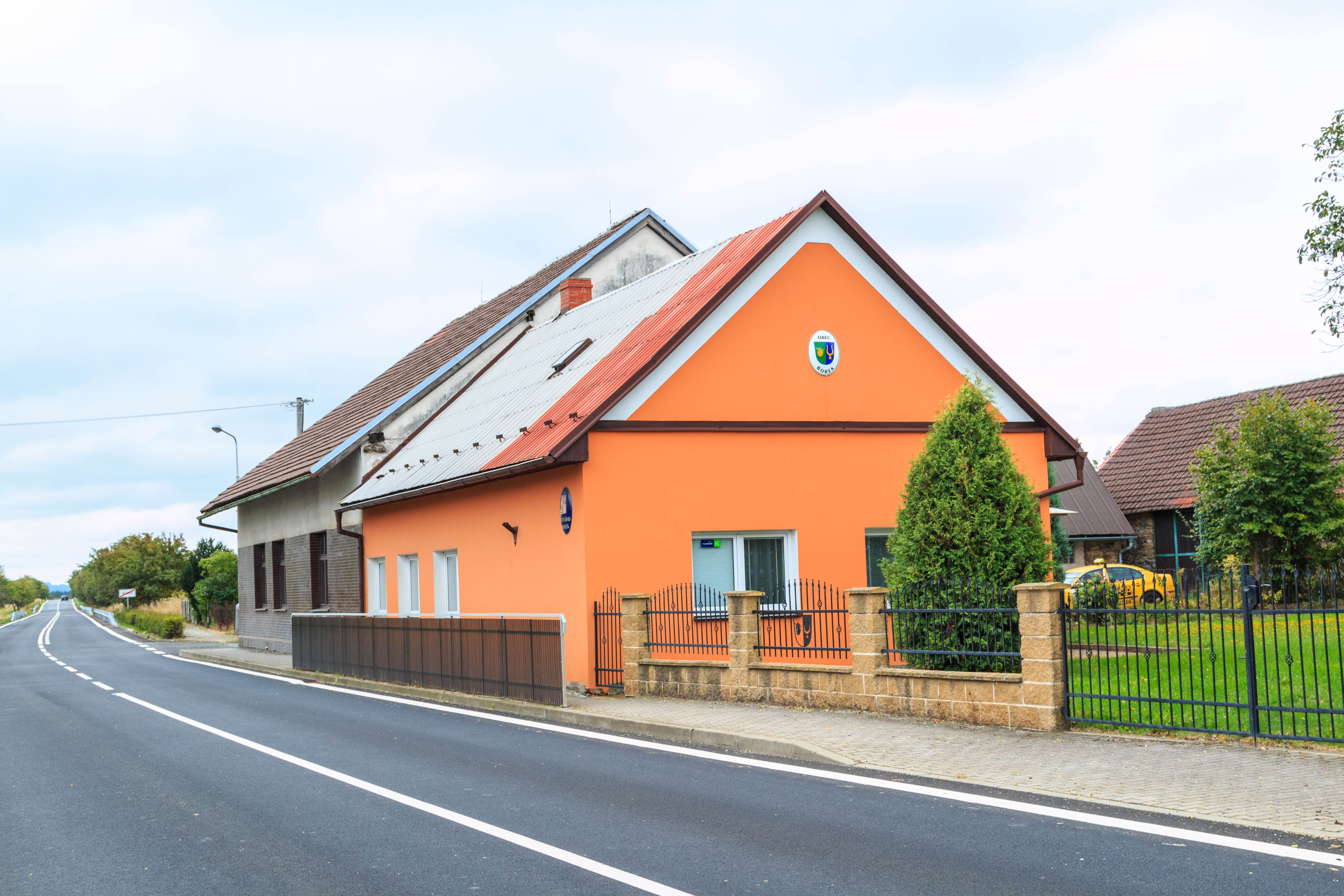
- Municipal office

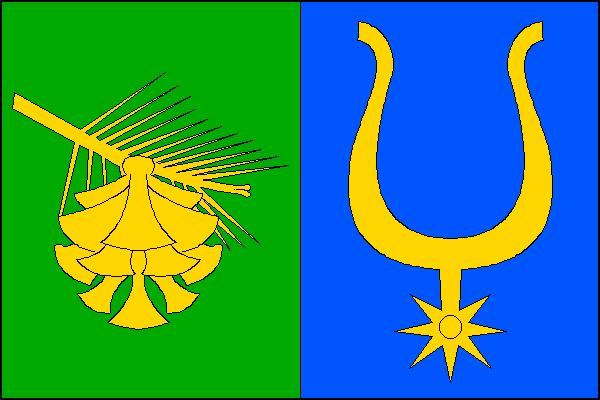
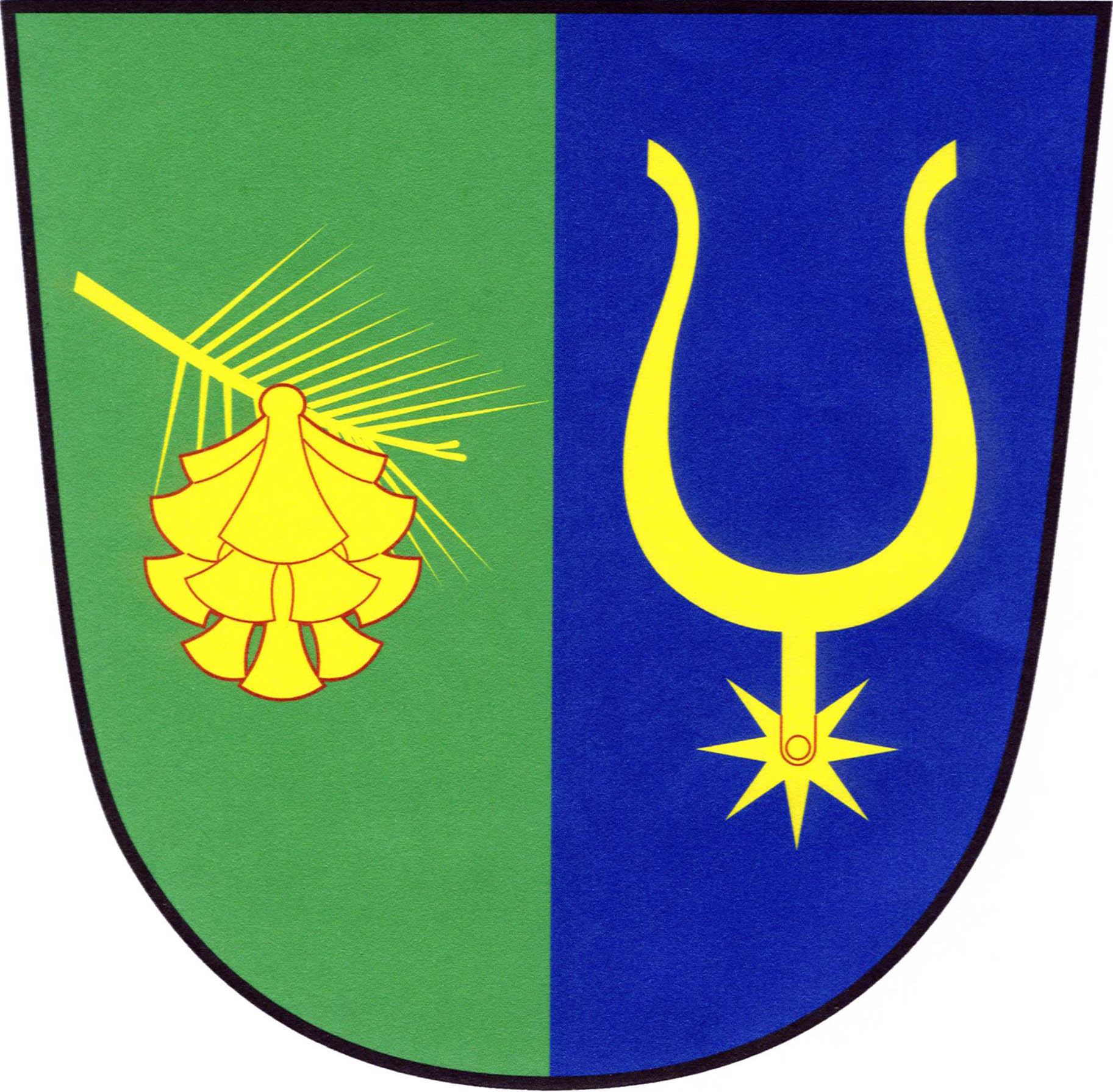
- Flag Coat of arms

- Location in the Czech Republic
- Coordinates: 49°47′31″N 15°35′24″E
- Country: Czech Republic
- Region: Vysočina
- District: Havlíčkův Brod
- First mentioned: 1557

Area
  - Total: 6.60 km^{2} (2.55 sq mi)
- Elevation: 433 m (1,421 ft)

Population (2026-01-01)
  - Total: 122
  - Density: 18.5/km^{2} (47.9/sq mi)
- Time zone: UTC+1 (CET)
  - Summer (DST): UTC+2 (CEST)
- Postal code: 582 82
- Website: www.borek-ostruzno.cz

Borek (Czech pronunciation: [ˈborɛk]) is a municipality and village in Havlíčkův Brod District in the Vysočina Region of the Czech Republic. It has about 100 inhabitants.

Borek lies approximately 21 kilometres (13 mi) north of Havlíčkův Brod, 45 km (28 mi) north of Jihlava, and 90 km (56 mi) east of Prague.

== Administrative division ==
Borek consists of two municipal parts (in brackets population according to the 2021 census):

- Borek (51)
- Ostružno (73)

== History ==
The first written mention of Borek is from 1557. Ostružno was first mentioned in 1397.

== Demographics ==
Historical population
Year	Pop.	±%
1869	392	—
1880	418	+6.6%
1890	386	−7.7%
1900	375	−2.8%
1910	419	+11.7%
1921	398	−5.0%
1930	374	−6.0%
1950	304	−18.7%
1961	296	−2.6%
1970	242	−18.2%
1980	167	−31.0%
1991	136	−18.6%
2001	143	+5.1%
2011	123	−14.0%
2021	124	+0.8%
Source: Censuses
