= Křenek =

- Municipality
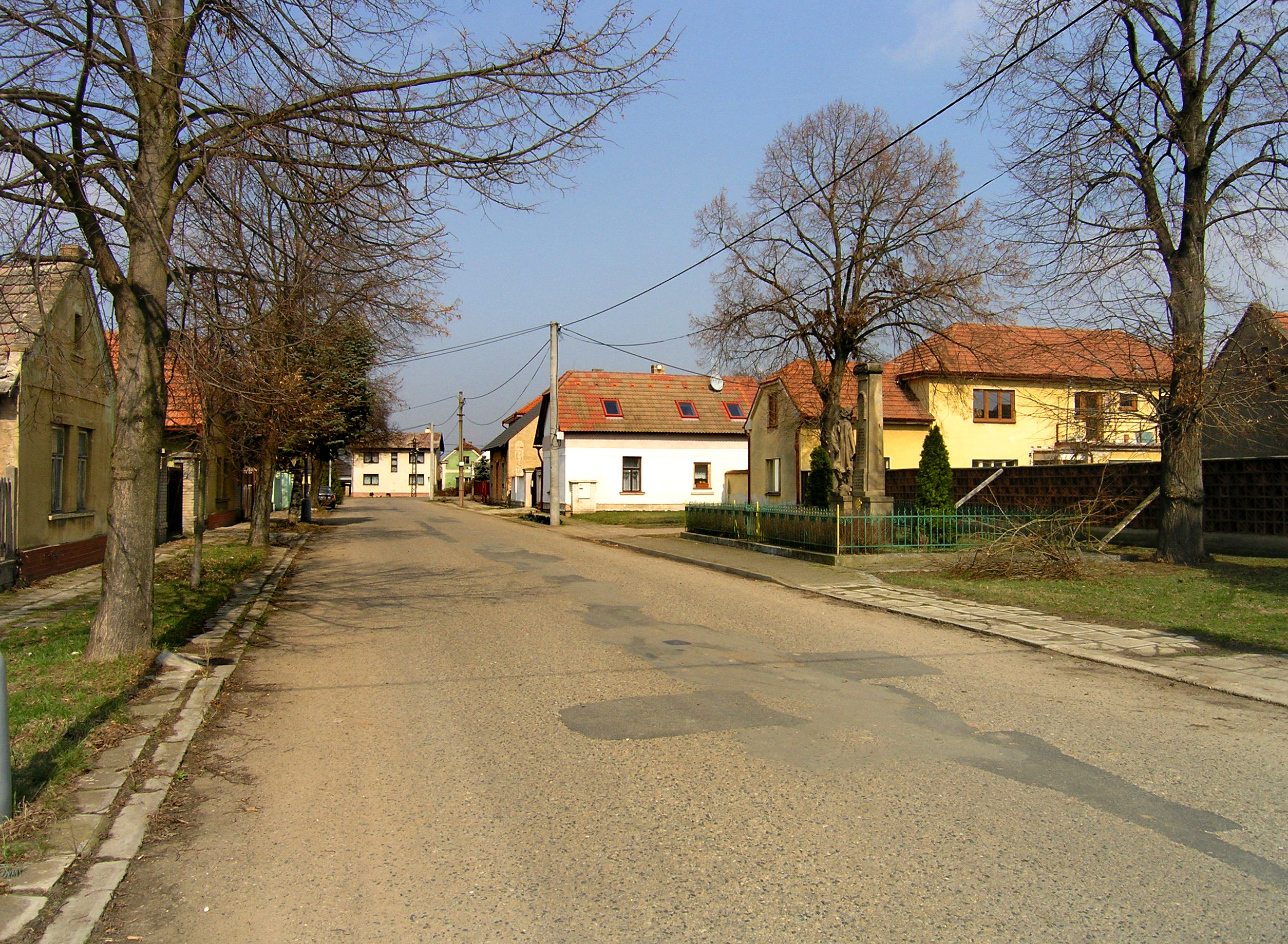
- Western part of Křenek

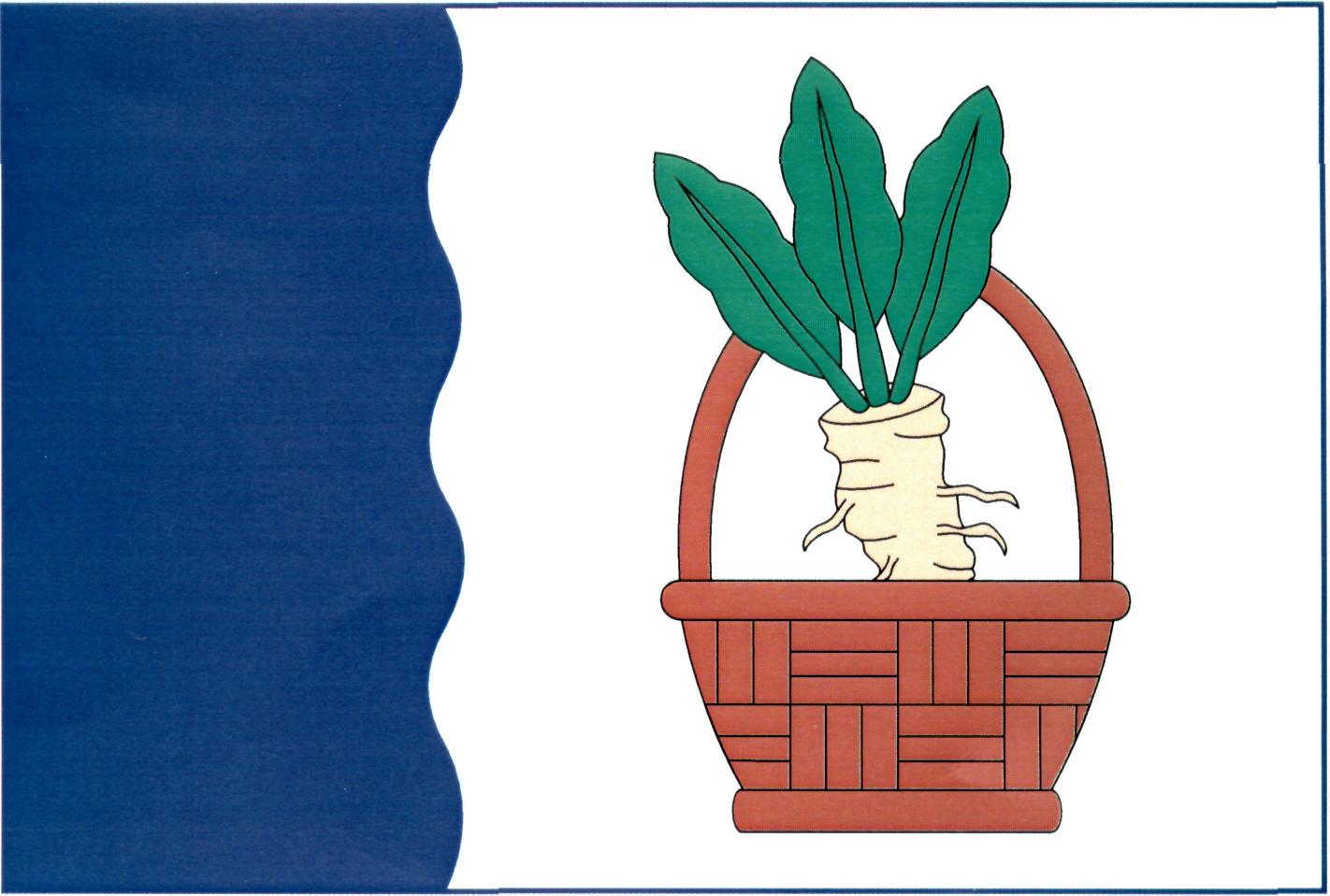
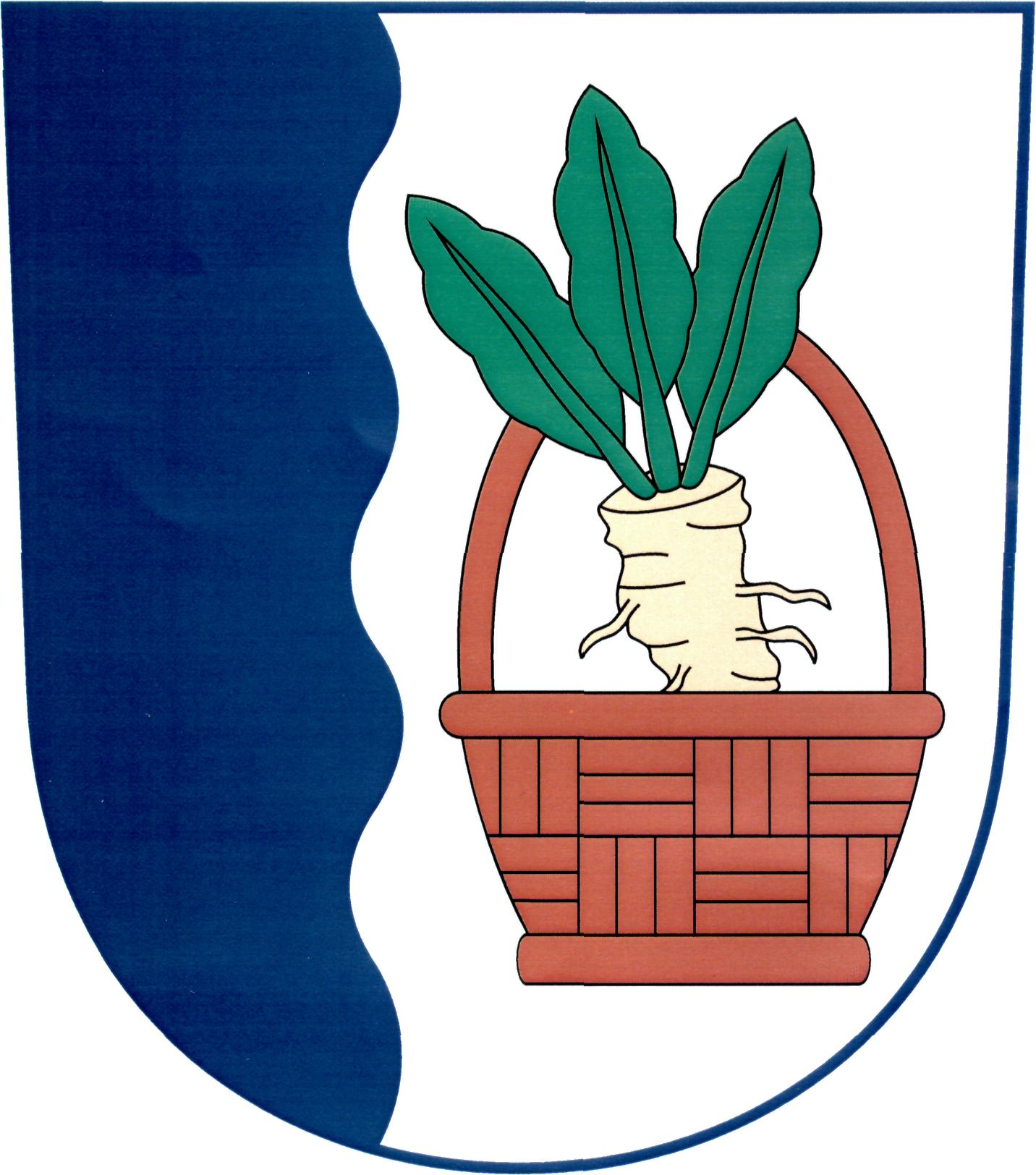
- Flag Coat of arms

- Location in the Czech Republic
- Coordinates: 50°13′47″N 14°37′46″E
- Country: Czech Republic
- Region: Central Bohemian
- District: Prague-East
- First mentioned: 1271

Area
  - Total: 5.29 km^{2} (2.04 sq mi)
- Elevation: 165 m (541 ft)

Population (2026-01-01)
  - Total: 332
  - Density: 62.8/km^{2} (163/sq mi)
- Time zone: UTC+1 (CET)
  - Summer (DST): UTC+2 (CEST)
- Postal code: 277 14
- Website: www.obeckrenek.cz

Křenek is a municipality and village in Prague-East District in the Central Bohemian Region of the Czech Republic. It has about 300 inhabitants.

== Demographics ==
Historical population
Year	Pop.	±%
1869	338	—
1880	328	−3.0%
1890	316	−3.7%
1900	326	+3.2%
1910	398	+22.1%
1921	393	−1.3%
1930	369	−6.1%
1950	336	−8.9%
1961	323	−3.9%
1970	293	−9.3%
1980	254	−13.3%
1991	223	−12.2%
2001	218	−2.2%
2011	241	+10.6%
2021	306	+27.0%
Source: Censuses
