= Velký Borek =

- Municipality
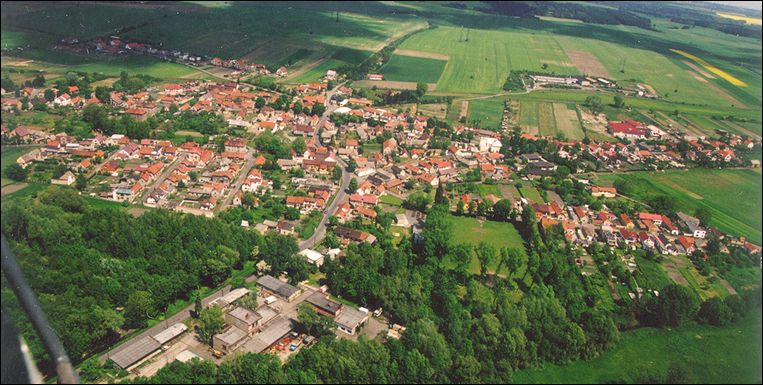
- Aerial view

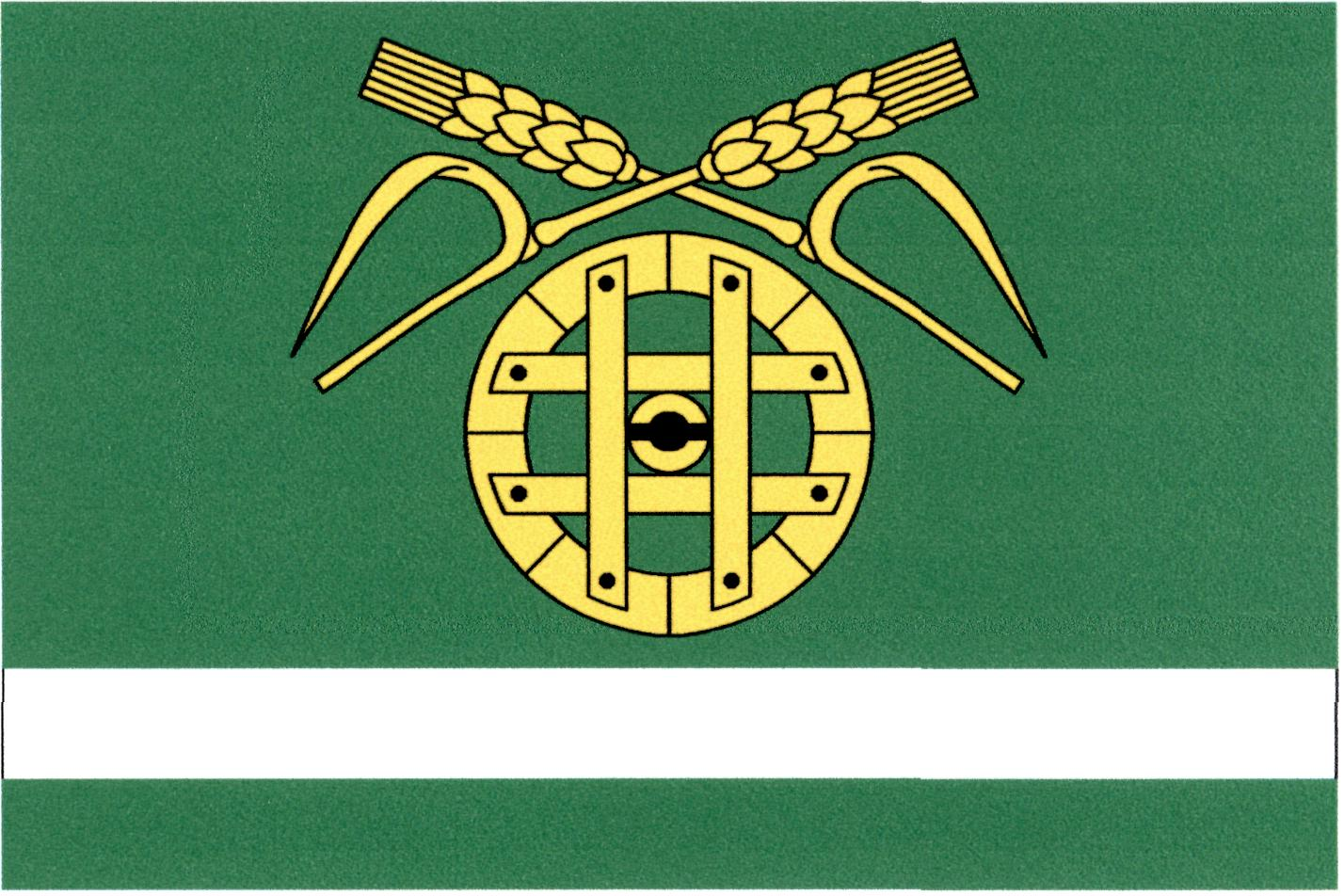
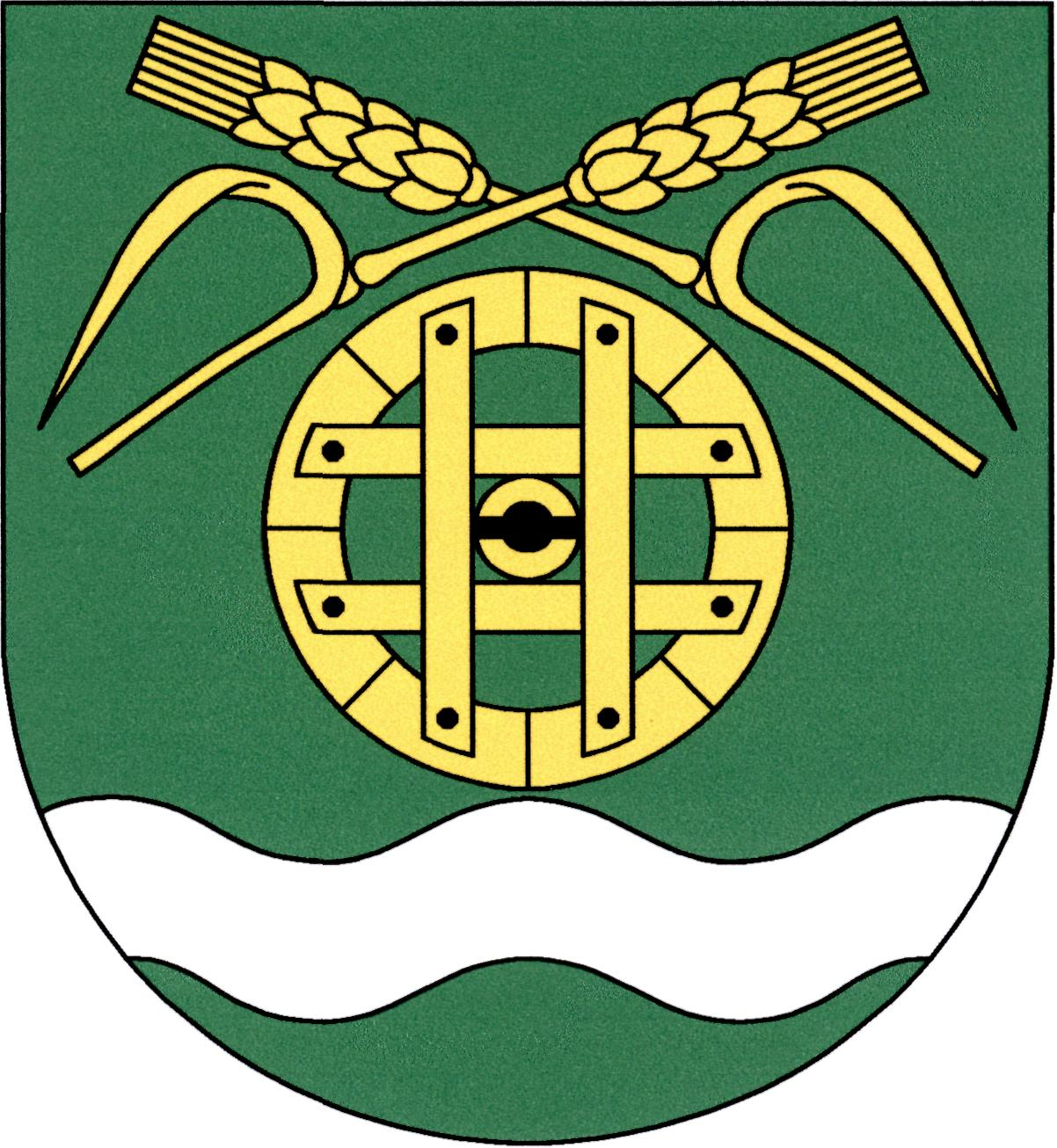
- Flag Coat of arms

- Location in the Czech Republic
- Coordinates: 50°20′43″N 14°30′55″E
- Country: Czech Republic
- Region: Central Bohemian
- District: Mělník
- First mentioned: 1301

Area
  - Total: 10.43 km^{2} (4.03 sq mi)
- Elevation: 176 m (577 ft)

Population (2026-01-01)
  - Total: 1,216
  - Density: 116.6/km^{2} (302.0/sq mi)
- Time zone: UTC+1 (CET)
  - Summer (DST): UTC+2 (CEST)
- Postal code: 277 31
- Website: www.velkyborek.cz

Velký Borek is a municipality and village in Mělník District in the Central Bohemian Region of the Czech Republic. It has about 1,200 inhabitants.

== Administrative division ==
Velký Borek consists of three municipal parts (in brackets population according to the 2021 census):

- Velký Borek (736)
- Mělnická Vrutice (181)
- Skuhrov (202)

== Demographics ==
Historical population
Year	Pop.	±%
1869	746	—
1880	795	+6.6%
1890	883	+11.1%
1900	951	+7.7%
1910	1,107	+16.4%
1921	1,166	+5.3%
1930	1,195	+2.5%
1950	1,067	−10.7%
1961	1,112	+4.2%
1970	1,046	−5.9%
1980	995	−4.9%
1991	842	−15.4%
2001	835	−0.8%
2011	980	+17.4%
2021	1,119	+14.2%
Source: Censuses
