= Ljubisav =

Slavic masculine given name

- Gender: masculine

Origin
- Language: Slavic
- Region of origin: Eastern Europe

Other names
- Nicknames: Ljubo, Ljuba, Ljubiša
- Related names: Ljubomir, Ljubodrag

Ljubisav (Cyrillic: Љубисав) is a Serbian masculine given name.

Notable people with the name include:

- Ljubisav Đokić (1943–2020), Serbian construction worker and activist
- Ljubisav Luković (born 1962), Serbian basketball player and coach
- Ljubisav Rakić (1931–2022), Serbian neurobiologist, professor, and academic
