= Lyubov =

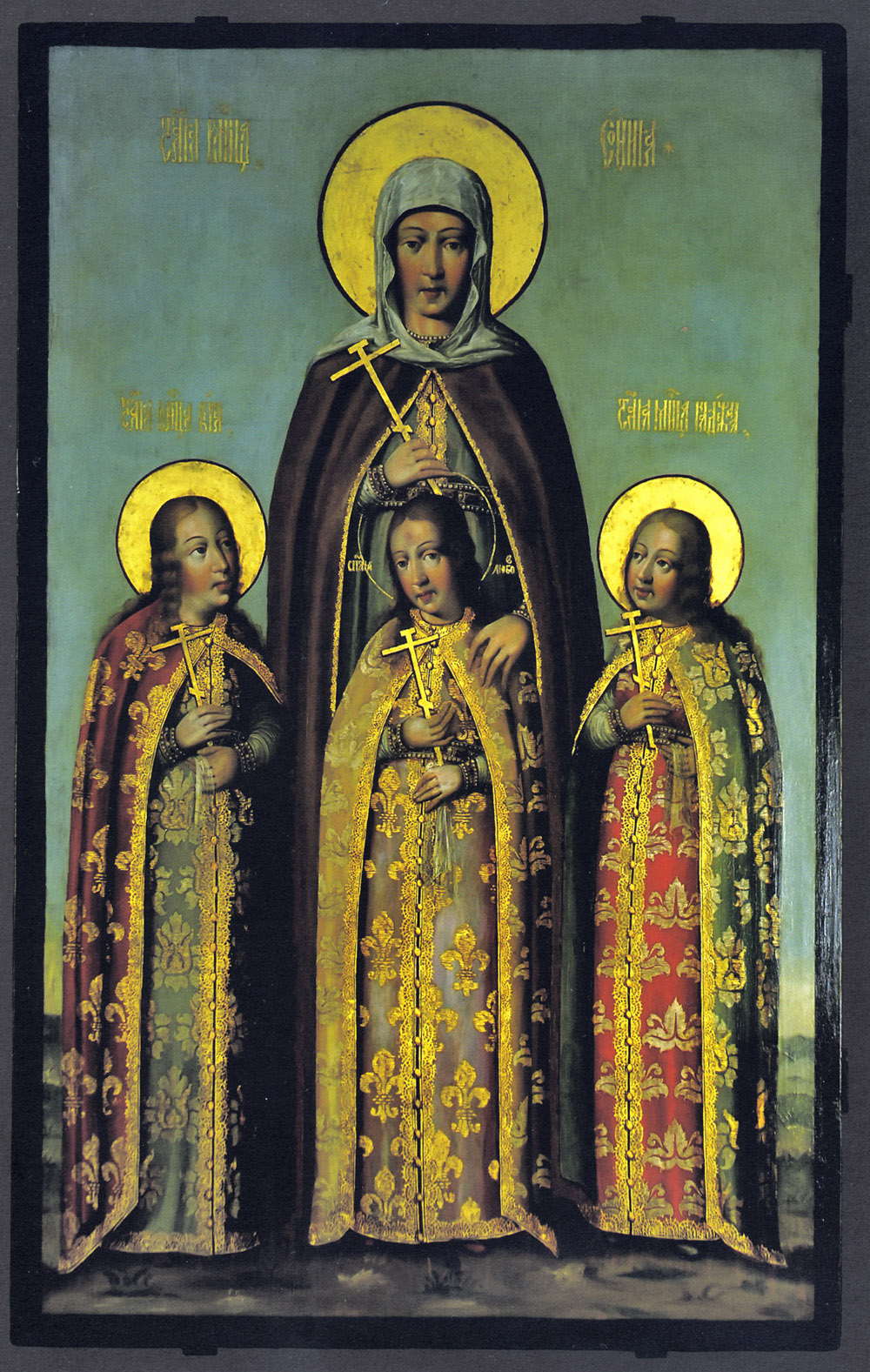
- Gender: female
- Language: Slavic

Origin
- Region of origin: Slavic

Other names
- Alternative spelling: Lubov, Liubov
- Related names: Lyuba, Ljuba, Luba, Lubica, Ljubica
- Popularity: see popular names

Lyubov, Liubov or Lubov is a Russian-language female given name literally meaning "love". The name entered the Russian culture as part of the trio: Vera, Nadezhda, and Lyubov as a calque from Greek of the names of saints Faith, Hope and Charity.

== Variants ==
- Russian: Любовь (Lyubov, Liubov, Lubov), diminutives: Люба (Lyuba, Liuba, Luba), Любка (Lyubka, Liubka, Lubka), and with other Russian diminutive suffixes: 'Lyub-' + '-ochka', '-onka', '-asha'.
- Ukrainian: Любов, Люба
- Belarusian: Любоў, Люба

== People ==
=== Lyubov ===
- Lyubov Dostoyevskaya, Russian writer, daughter of Fyodor Dostoyevsky
- Lyubov Golanchikova, Russian pilot
- Lyubov Kremlyova, Russian athlete
- Lyubov Orlova, Russian actress
- Lyubov Popova, Russian avant-garde artist
- Lyubov Savelyeva (born 1940), Russian glass artist
- Lyubov Eduardovna Sobol, (born 1987), Russian political figure, a lawyer of the Anti-Corruption Foundation
- Lyubov Sirota, Ukrainian journalist and writer
- Lyubov S. Sokolova, Russian actress
- Lyubov V. Sokolova, Russian volleyball player
- Lyubov Sova, Russian philologist
- Lyubov Uspenskaya, American singer of Russian/Ukrainian origin
- Lyubov Vorona, Ukrainian farm worker and politician

=== Liubov ===
- Liubov Charkashyna (born 1987), retired Belarusian individual rhythmic gymnast
- Liubov Efimenko (born 1999), Finnish figure skater
- Liubov Gorashchenko (born 2010), Ukrainian rhythmic gymnast
- Liubov Gurevich (1866–1940), Russian editor, translator, author, and critic
- Liubov Ilyushechkina (born 1991), Russian-born Canadian pair skater
- Liubov Nikitina (born 1999), Russian freestyle skier who competes internationally
- Liubov Sereda (born 1945), retired Soviet rhythmic gymnast
- Liubov Sheremeta (born 1980), Ukrainian former artistic gymnast
- Liubov Yaskevich (born 1985), Russian female sport shooter

=== Lubov ===
- Lubov Azria, American fashion designer of Ukrainian origin
- Lubov Bakirova, Russian pair skater
- Lubov Gazov, Austrian aerobic gymnast of Bulgarian origin
- Lubov Rabinovich, Russian painter
- Lubov Roudenko, French-American ballet dancer and fashion designer of Russian/Bulgarian origin
- Lubov Tchernicheva, Russian ballet dancer
- Lubov Volosova, Russian wrestler
- Lubov Zsiltzova-Lisenko, Ukrainian chess player
- Lubov (painter), Russian science fiction and fantasy artist

== See also ==
- Luba (given name)
- Ljubica (name)
- Ljubomir (given name)
- Ljupka
- Love (given name)
