= Libuše (name) =

Libuše (Czech pronunciation: ['lɪbʊʃɛ]) is a Czech female given name derived from the adjective libý, the base of which is Slavonic l'ub meaning "love", "lovable". Related names are Ljuba, Liběna and Liboslava.

== Name days ==
- Czech: 10 July
- Slovak: 30 July

== Other variants ==
- Serbian: Libuša
- Croatian: Libuša
- Slovak: Libuša
- Polish: Libusza
- German: Libussa, Libuscha
- English: Libusha

== Famous bearers ==
- Libuše Benešová, Czech politician and first female President of the Senate
- Libuše Domanínská, Czech opera singer
- Libuše Havelková, Czech actress
- Libuše Jarcovjáková, Czech photographer
- Libuše Márová, Czech opera singer and actress
- Libuše Moníková, Czech writer
- Libuše Průšová, Czech tennis player
- Libuše Šafránková, Czech actress
- Libuše Švormová, Czech actress

== See also ==
- Libuše, Bohemian princess
- Lyubov (name)
- Ljubiša
