= Lubomír =

Slavic masculine given name

Lubomír / Ľubomír
- Pronunciation: Czech: [ˈlubomiːr] Slovak: [ʎubɔmiːr]
- Gender: masculine

Origin
- Language: Slavic
- Origin: lub ("love") and mir ("peace")
- Region of origin: Eastern Europe

Other names
- Alternative spelling: Ľubomír
- Nicknames: Lubo, Lubor, Luboš, Borek
- Related names: Ljubomir, Lyubomir

Lubomír or Ľubomír is a Slavic masculine given name. It is composed of the Slavic elements lub ("love, to like") and mir ("peace"), both common in Slavic dithematic names, and thus means "peace lover" / "one who loves peace".

Nicknames include Lubo, Lubor, Luboš, Borek, Luborek, Lubošek, Lubik.

The name Lubomír is used in Czech, while Ľubomír is the Slovak form of the name. The names are equivalent to the Serbo-Croatian name Ljubomir and the Bulgarian and Ukrainian name Lyubomir / Lyubomyr.

== Notable people with the name ==
=== Lubomír ===
- Lubomír Beneš (1935–1995), Czech animator, director, and author
- Lubomír Blaha (born 1978), Czech footballer
- Lubomír David (born 1964), Czech wrestler
- Lubomír Doležel (1922–2017), Czech literary theorist
- Lubomír Dvořák (born 1940), Czech physicist
- Lubomír Havlák (1921–2014), Czech singer
- Lubomír Janko (born 1955), Czech rower
- Lubomír Jančařík (born 1987), Czech table tennis player
- Lubomír Jedek (born 1962), Czech motorcycle speedway rider
- Lubomir Kavalek (1943–2021), Czech-American chess player
- Lubomír Knapp (born 1950), Czech footballer
- Lubomír Kubica (born 1979), Czech footballer
- Lubomír Ledl (1952–2021), Czech politician
- Lubomír Lipský (1923–2015), Czech actor
- Lubomír Metnar (born 1967), Czech politician
- Lubomír Nácovský (1935–1982), Czech sport shooter
- Lubomír Nádeníček (born 1947), Czech hurdler
- Lubomír Petruš (born 1990), Czech cyclist
- Lubomír Pokluda (born 1958), Czech footballer
- Lubomír Přibyl (born 1937), Czech painter and printmaker
- Lubomír Puček (born 1961), Czech football referee
- Lubomír Sršeň (born 1954), Czech weightlifter
- Lubomír Štach (born 1986), Czech ice hockey player
- Lubomír Štrougal (1924–2023), Czech politician
- Lubomír Tesáček (1957–2011), Czech long-distance runner
- Lubomir Tomaszewski (1923–2018), Polish-American painter, sculptor and designer
- Lubomír Tomeček (born 1979), Czech mountain bike and ski orienteer
- Lubomír Vambera (1925–2007), Czechoslovak sprint canoeist
- Lubomír Vlk (born 1964), Czech footballer
- Lubomír Vosátko (born 1977), Czech ice hockey player
- Lubomír Zajíček (1946–2013), Czech volleyball player
- Lubomír Zaorálek (born 1966), Czech politician
- Lubomír Zapletal (born 1951), Czech rower

=== Ľubomír ===
- Ľubomír Belko (born 2002), Slovak footballer
- Ľubomír Belák (born 1951), Slovak musician and TV producer
- Ľubomír Bernáth (born 1985), Slovak footballer
- Ľubomír Dinda (born 1994), Slovak ice hockey player
- Ľubomír Dobrík 1952–2022), Slovak judge
- Ľubomír Dolgoš (1956–2004), Slovak politician, educator and economist
- Ľubomír Faktor (born 1967), Slovak footballer
- Ľubomír Feldek (born 1936), Slovak poet and writer
- Ľubomír Ftáčnik (born 1957), Slovak chess player
- Ľubomír Galko (born 1968), Slovak politician
- Ľubomír Gogolák (born 1990), Slovak footballer
- Ľubomír Guldan (born 1983), Slovak footballer
- Ľubomír Hagara (born 1985), Slovak sprint canoeist
- Ľubomír Hurtaj (born 1975), Slovak ice hockey player
- Ľubomír Jahnátek (born 1954), Slovak politician
- Ľubomír Kadnár (1941–2008), Slovak sprint canoer
- Ľubomír Kolník (born 1968), Slovak ice hockey player
- Ľubomír Korijkov (born 1993), Slovak footballer
- Ľubomír Lipták (1930–2003), Slovak historian
- Ľubomír Luhový (born 1967), Slovak football player and coach
- Ľubomír Machyniak (born 1971), Slovak biathlete
- Ľubomír Malina (born 1991), Slovak ice hockey player
- Ľubomír Meszároš (born 1979), Slovak footballer
- Ľubomír Michalík (born 1983), Slovak footballer
- Ľubomír Mick (born 1978), Slovak luger
- Ľubomír Moravčík (born 1965), Slovak footballer
- Ľubomír Nosický (born 1967), Slovak footballer
- Ľubomír Novosád (born 1972), Slovak volleyball player
- Ľubomír Paulovič (1952–2024), Slovak actor
- Ľubomír Petrák (1961–2021), Slovak politician
- Ľubomír Pištej (born 1984), Slovak table tennis player
- Ľubomír Pištek (born 1980), Slovak ice hockey player
- Ľubomír Rehák (born 1970), Slovak diplomat
- Ľubomír Reiter (born 1974), Slovak footballer
- Ľubomír Roman (1944–2022), Slovak politician
- Ľubomír Šatka (born 1995), Slovak footballer
- Ľubomír Sekeráš (born 1968), Slovak ice hockey player
- Ľubomír Stankovský (1951-2024), Slovak musician
- Ľubomír Švajlen (born 1964), Slovak handball player
- Ľubomír Tupta (born 1998), Slovak footballer
- Ľubomír Ulrich (born 1989), Slovak footballer
- Ľubomír Urgela (born 1990), Slovak footballer
- Ľubomír Vaic (born 1977), Slovak ice hockey player
- Ľubomír Vaškovič (born 1986), Slovak ice hockey player
- Ľubomír Višňovský (born 1976), Slovak ice hockey player
- Ľubomír Vážny (born 1957), Slovak politician
- Ľubomír Willwéber (born 1992), Slovak footballer

== See also ==
- Ljubomir
- Lyubomir
