= Ljubomir =

Slavic masculine given name

- Pronunciation: Serbo-Croatian: [ʎûbomiːr]
- Gender: masculine

Origin
- Language: Slavic
- Origin: ljub ("love") and mir ("peace")
- Region of origin: Eastern Europe

Other names
- Alternative spelling: Љубомир
- Variant form: Ljubica (f)
- Nicknames: Ljubo, Ljuba, Ljubiša
- Related names: Lubomír, Lyubomir, Miroljub, Ljubodrag, Ljubisav

Ljubomir (Cyrillic: Љубомир) is a South Slavic masculine given name. It is composed of the Slavic elements ljub ("love, to like") and mir ("peace"), both common in Slavic dithematic names, and thus means "peace lover" / "one who loves peace".

The name Ljubomir is mostly used in the Serbia, Croatia, Macedonia and Montenegro. Is it equivalent to the Czech and Slovak name Lubomír and the Bulgarian and Ukrainian name Lyubomir / Lyubomyr.

== Notable people with the name ==
- Ljubomir Aleksandrović (1828–1887), Serbian painter
- Ljubomir Babić (1890–1974), Croatian artist, museum curator and literary critic
- Ljubomir Bandović (born 1976), Serbian actor
- Ljubomir Belogaski (1911–1994), Macedonian painter
- Ljubomir Benčić (1905–1992), Croatian football player and coach
- Ljubomir Ćipranić (1936–2010), Serbian actor
- Ljubomir Čelebić (born 1991), Montenegrin tennis player
- Ljubomir Crnokrak (born 1958), Croatian Serb professional football manager
- Ljubomir Cuculovski (born 1948), Macedonian philosopher and university professor
- Ljubomir Davidović (1863–1940), Serbian politician
- Ljubomir Đinović (born 2005), Montenegrin footballer
- Ljubomir Đurković (1952–2022), Montenegrin author and poet
- Ljubomir Fejsa (born 1988), Serbian footballer
- Ljubomir Frčkoski (born 1957), Macedonian diplomat
- Ljubomir Ivanović (1882–1945), Serbian painter and printmaker
- Ljubomir Ivanović Gedža (1925–1980), Yugoslav wrestler and wrestling coach
- Ljubomir Jezdić (1884—1927), Serbian military commander
- Ljubomir Jovanović (1865–1928), Serbian politician and historian
- Ljubomir Kaljević (1841–1907), Serbian politician and academic
- Ljubomir Katić (1934–2025), Serbian basketball player and coach
- Ljubomir Kerekeš (born 1960), Croatian actor
- Ljubomir Klerić (1844–1910), Serbian engineer, mathematician and inventor
- Ljubomir Kokeza (1920–1992), Croatian footballer
- Ljubomir Kovačević (1848–1918), Serbian writer, historian and academic
- Ljubomir Ljubojević (born 1959), Serbian chess player
- Ljubomir Lovrić (1920–1994), Yugoslav footballer
- Ljubomir Magaš (1948–1986), Serbian amateur boxer and criminal
- Ljubomir Maksimović (born 1938), Serbian byzantologist
- Ljubomir Maraković (1887–1959), Croatian literary critic and historian
- Ljubomir Marić (general) (1878–1960), Serbian military officer and army general
- Ljubomir Marić (born 1977), Serbian politician
- Ljubomir Mihajlović (born 1943), Serbian footballer
- Ljubomir Mihajlovski (born 1954), Macedonian politician
- Ljubomir Miloš (1919–1948), Croatian war criminal
- Ljubomir Mladenovski (born 1995), Macedonian professional basketball player
- Ljubomir Nedić (1858–1902), Serbian philosopher and literary critic
- Ljubomir Nenadović (1826–1895), Serbian writer and poet
- Ljubomir Obradović (born 1954), Serbian handball coach
- Ljubomir Ognjanović (1933–2008), Serbian footballer
- Ljubomir Petrović (born 1947), Serbian football player and coach
- Ljubomir Pokorni (1872–1944), Serbian army general
- Ljubomir Popović (1934–2016), Serbian painter
- Ljubomir Radanović (born 1960), Montenegrin footballer
- Ljubomir Ristić (born 1990), Serbian basketball player and actor
- Ljubomir Ristovski (born 1969), Serbian football player and manager
- Ljubomir S. Jovanović (1877–1913), known as Ljuba Čupa, Serbian guerrilla fighter
- Ljubomir Savevski (born 1957), Macedonian handball player
- Ljubomir Simović (1935–2025), Serbian writer, playwright and academic
- Ljubomir Stanković (1945–2011), Serbian basketball player
- Ljubomir Stefanov (born 1975), Macedonian filmmaker
- Ljubomir Stevanović (born 1986), Serbian footballer
- Ljubomir Stojanović (1860–1930), Serbian philologist
- Ljubomir Tadić (1925–2013), Serbian academic and politician
- Ljubomir Tadić (1929–2005), known as Ljuba Tadić, Yugoslav actor
- Ljubomir Temelkovski (born 1954), Canadian federal politician
- Ljubomir Travica (born 1954), Serbian volleyball player and coach
- Ljubomir Vorkapić (born 1967), Serbian footballer
- Ljubomir Vranjes (born 1973), Swedish handball player
- Ljubomir Vračarević (1947–2013), Serbian martial artist
- Ljubomir Vuksanović (1875–1945), Montenegrin lawyer
- Ljubomir Vulović (1876–1917), Serbian army officer

== See also ==
- Vrpolje Ljubomir, village in Bosnia-Herzegovina
- Miroljub
- Slavic names
