= Miroljub =

Slavic masculine given name

- Pronunciation: Serbo-Croatian: [mîroʎub]
- Gender: masculine

Origin
- Language: Slavic
- Origin: mir (peace) and ljub (love)
- Meaning: one who loves peace
- Region of origin: Eastern Europe

Other names
- Related names: Ljubomir, Miroslav

Miroljub (Cyrillic: Мирољуб) is a Slavic masculine given name used in South Slavic languages, especially Serbian.

The name is composed of the Slavic elements mir ("peace") and ljub ("love"), thus meaning "peaceful love" or "one who loves peace".

== Notable people with the name ==
- Miroljub Čavić, Serbian basketball player
- Miroljub Damjanović (born 1950), Serbian basketball player
- Miroljub Đorđević (born 1938), Serbian ice hockey player
- Miroljub Jevtić (born 1955), Serbian politologist and university professor
- Miroljub Jovanović (born 1944), Serbian medical doctor and politician
- Miroljub Kostić (born 1988), Serbian footballer
- Miroljub Labus (born 1947), Serbian economist and politician
- Miroljub Lešo (1946–2019), Serbian actor
- Miroljub Pešić (born 1993), Serbian footballer
- Miroljub Stanković (1946–2017), Serbian politician
- Miroljub Todorović (born 1940), Serbian poet and artist

== See also ==
- Miroljub (magazine)
- Ljubomir
