= Libuše (disambiguation) =

Libuše may refer to:

- Libuše, legendary ancestor of the Přemyslid dynasty and the Czech people as whole
- Libuše (name), Czech female given name (includes people bearing the name)
- Libuše (opera), opera by Bedřich Smetana
- Libuse, Louisiana, town in the United States
