= Lyuba =

Lyuba may refer to:

- Lyuba (given name), a Slavic male or female given name cognate to Ljuba or Luba or Lyubov
- Lyuba (mammoth), a female mammoth calf
- Lyuba (crater), a crater on Venus
