= Lyubomir =

Slavic masculine given name

- Pronunciation: Ukrainian: [lʲʊˈbɔmɪr] Bulgarian: [ʎuˈbɔmir]
- Gender: Male

Origin
- Language: Slavic
- Origin: ljub ("love") and mir ("peace")
- Region of origin: Eastern Europe

Other names
- Alternative spelling: Lyubomyr, Liubomir, Lubomyr
- Related names: Lubomír, Ljubomir

Lyubomir (Cyrillic: Любомир), also transliterated as Lyubomyr, Liubomyr and Lubomyr, is a Slavic masculine given name. It is composed of the Slavic elements lyub ("love, to like") and mir ("peace" or "world"), both common in Slavic dithematic names. Thus, the name has two meanings. The first, and more common, is "peace lover". The second is "someone who is beloved by the world".

The transliteration Lyubomir is used in Bulgarian, the transliterations Lyubomyr, Liubomyr and Lubomyr are used in Ukrainian. The name is equivalent to the Czech and Slovak name Lubomír and the Croatian and Serbian name Ljubomir.

== Notable people with the name ==
=== Lyubomir ===
- Lyubomir Agontsev (born 26 July 1987), Bulgarian volleyball player
- Lyubomir Andreychin (1910–1975), Bulgarian linguist
- Lyubomir Angelov (1912–1984), Bulgarian football player and coach
- Lyubomir Bogdanov (born 1982), Bulgarian footballer
- Lyubomir Bozhinov (born 1986), Bulgarian footballer
- Lyubomir Chernev (born 1986), Bulgarian footballer
- Lyubomir Epitropov (born 1999), Bulgarian swimmer
- Lyubomir Ganev (born 1965), Bulgarian volleyball player
- Lyubomir Genchev (born 1986), Bulgarian footballer
- Lyubomir Gueraskov (born 1968), Bulgarian gymnast
- Lyubomir Gutsev (born 1990), Bulgarian footballer
- Lyubomir Hranov (1923–2011), Bulgarian footballer
- Lyubomir Ivanov (explorer) (born 1952), Bulgarian scientist and explorer
- Lyubomir Ivanov (racewalker) (born 1960), Bulgarian race walker
- Lyubomir Kantonistov (born 1978), Russian footballer
- Lyubomir Krastanov (1908–1977), Bulgarian physicist and meteorologist
- Lyubomir Lubenov (born 1980), Bulgarian footballer
- Lyubomir Lyubenov (canoeist) (born 1957), Bulgarian sprint canoeist
- Lyubomir Lyubomirov (1958–2020), Bulgarian ice hockey player
- Lyubomir Markov (born 14 August 1927), Bulgarian boxer
- Lyubomir Milchev-Dandy (1963–2022), Bulgarian journalist, television personality and writer
- Lyubomir Miletich (1863–1937), Bulgarian linguist, ethnographer, dialectologist and historian
- Lyubomir Neikov (born 1972), Bulgarian comedian and actor
- Lyubomir Nyagolov (born 1977), Bulgarian footballer
- Lyubomir Oresharov (born 1940), Bulgarian sprint canoeist
- Lyubomir Panov (1933–2022), Bulgarian basketball player
- Lyubomir Petrov (born 1954), Bulgarian rower
- Liubomir Petrov (1913–1999), Bulgarian footballer
- Lyubomir Popov (born 1967), Bulgarian alpine skier
- Lyubomir Runtov (born 1942), Bulgarian water polo player
- Lyubomir Sheytanov (born 1961), Bulgarian footballer
- Lyubomir Todorov (born 1988), Bulgarian footballer
- Lyubomir Toskov (born 1945), Bulgarian cross-country skier
- Lyubomir Vitanov (born 1981), Bulgarian footballer
- Lyubomir Nikolov Vladikin (1891–1948), Bulgarian jurist, writer and nationalist

=== Other transliterations ===
- Liubomyr Huzar (1933–2017), Ukrainian bishop
- Liubomyr Lemeshko (born 1992), Ukrainian swimmer
- Liubomyr Medvid (born 1941), Ukrainian painter
- Liubomyr Ortynskyi (1919–1961), Ukrainian military officer
- Liubomyr Vynar (1932–2017), Ukrainian-American scholar and historian
- Liubomyr Zubach (born 1978), Ukrainian politician and lawyer
- Ljubomir Chakaloff (1886–1963), Bulgarian mathematician
- Ljubomir Czajkowsky, (1918–1974), Ukrainian–Polish–Austrian tennis player
- Lubomir Dymsha (1860–1915), Russian lawyer and nobleman
- Lubomir Guedjev (born 1978), Bulgarian mixed martial artist
- Lubomir Levitski (born 1980), Ukrainian film director and screenwriter
- Lubomir Mykytiuk, Canadian actor
- Lubomyr Kuzmak (1929–2006), Ukrainian-American surgeon
- Lubomyr Luciuk (born 1953), Ukrainian-Canadian academic and author
- Lubomyr Melnyk (born 1948) Ukrainian-Canadian composer and pianist
- Lubomyr Romankiw (1931–2024), Ukrainian-Canadian-American electrochemist, scientist and inventor
- Lyubomyr Dmyterko (1911–1985), Ukrainian poet and writer
- Lyubomyr Halchuk (born 1981), Ukrainian footballer
- Lyubomyr Ivanskyi (born 1983), Ukrainian footballer
- Lyubomyr Polatayko (born 1979), Ukrainian racing cyclist

== See also ==
- Lubomír
- Ljubomir
