= Luboš =

- Gender: male

Origin
- Origin: Slavic
- Meaning: lub ("love")

Other names
- Alternative spelling: Ľuboš, Lubosz, Lubos
- Related names: Luboslav, Lubomir

Luboš is a Slavic male given name meaning love and used mostly in the Czech Republic and Slovakia. In Slovakia with spelling Ľuboš. The name is a short form of names like: Luboslav, Lubomir.

== Notable bearers ==
- Luboš Adamec, Czech sport shooter
- Luboš Adamec (footballer), Czech footballer
- Ľuboš Bartečko, Slovak ice hockey player
- Luboš Bartoň, Czech professional basketball player
- Ľuboš Blaha, Slovak philosopher and politician
- Luboš Fišer, Czech composer
- Luboš Kohoutek, Czech astronomer
- Ľuboš Kostelný, Slovak actor
- Luboš Kozel, Czech footballer
- Luboš Kubík, Czech former footballer and manager
- Luboš Loučka, Czech footballer
- Ľuboš Micheľ, Slovak football referee
- Luboš Motl, Czech theoretical physicist
- Luboš Sluka, Czech composer
- Luboš Zajíček, Czech jazz cornetist
