= Lubo =

Lubo is a male given name. Notable people with this name include:

- Lubo Kristek (born 1943), Czech artist

== See also ==
- Lubo (film), 2023 film
- Lubo Kirov, pseudonym of Lubomir Tsvetanov Kirov (born 1972), Bulgarian singer
- Ljubo Karaman
- Lubomir
