= Ljuba (given name) =

Ljuba is a Slavic given name. In the Serbian language, it is best known as a masculine name, cognate to Ljubomir or Ljubo. In other Slavic languages it's more often a feminine name Ljubica in (Serbian, Czech, Bulgarian, Macedonian), cognate to Lyubov, and also spelled Lyuba (Bulgarian Люба), Luba (Ukrainian and Russian Люба; Czech, Polish), Ľuba (Slovak).

The masculine name may refer to:

- Ljuba Aličić, Serbian Romani folk singer
- Ljuba Čupa, Serbian soldier
- Ljuba Jezdić, Serbian lawyer and soldier
- Ljuba Tadić, Serbian actor

The feminine name may refer to:

- Ljuba Kristol, Israeli chess grandmaster of Russian origin
- Ljuba Monastirskaja, Latvian textile artist
- Ljuba Prenner, Slovene lawyer and writer (assigned female at birth and a feminine name)
- Ljuba Welitsch, Bulgarian actress
- Lyuba Mollova, Bulgarian athlete
- Lyuba Ognenova-Marinova, Bulgarian archeologist
- Luba Blum-Bielicka, Polish nurse and activist
- Luba Drozd (born 1982), Ukrainian-American installation artist
- Luba Genush, Canadian artist of Ukraininan origin
- Luba Golovina, Georgian trampolinist of Russian descent
- Luba Goy (born 1945), Canadian actress and comedian of Ukrainian/German origin
- Luba Jurgenson, French writer of Russian/Estonian origin
- Luba Kadison, Lithuanian Jewish actress
- Luba Lowery, Russian-born American paralympic athlete
- Luba Lukova, American visual artist of Bulgarian origin
- Luba Marks, an American fashion designer and former French-Russian ballet dancer
- Luba Mason, American singer and actress of Slovak descent
- Luba Mirella, Italian opera singer of Polish origin
- Luba Mushtuk, Russian dancer and choreographer
- Luba Robin Goldsmith, Ukrainian-born American physician and clubwoman
- Luba Skořepová, Czech actress
- Luba Sterlikova, Russian-American artist
- Luba (singer) (born 1958), Canadian music artist of Ukrainian descent
- Ľuba Lesná, Slovak writer
- Ľuba Orgonášová, Slovak opera singer

Derivative forms include Ljubica, Ljupka, Ljubinka, Ľubica, Ljubana.
