= Lubor =

Lubor or Ľubor is a Czech and Slovak masculine given name, a derivative of Lubomir. It may refer to:

- Lubor Bárta, Czech composer
- Lubor Blažek, Czech basketball coach
- Lubor Knapp, Czech football player
- Ľubor Kresák, Slovak astronomer
- Lubor Niederle, Czech anthropologist and archaeologist
- Ľubor Štark, Slovak sprint canoer
- Lubor Těhník, Czech ceramist
- Lubor Tesař, Czech cyclist
- Lubor Tokoš, Czech actor
- Lubor J. Zink, Czech-Canadian writer

== See also ==
- Lubomir
