= Ljubomir Đinović =

Montenegrin footballer (born 2005)

Personal information
- Full name: Ljubomir Đinović
- Date of birth: 5 June 2005 (age 21)
- Place of birth: Kotor, Montenegro
- Position: Midfielder

Team information
- Current team: Grbaljbr/>(on loan from Arsenal Tivat)
- Number: 20

Youth career
- 2015–2020: Grbalj
- 2020–: Arsenal Tivat

Senior career*
Years	Team	Apps	(Gls)
2023–	Arsenal Tivat	0	(0)
2025–	→ Grbalj (loan)	1	(0)
- * Club domestic league appearances and goals as of 4 April 2025

Ljubomir Đinović (born 5 June 2005) is a Montenegrin professional footballer who plays for Grbalj, on loan from Arsenal Tivat.
