= Luba Genush =

Canadian artist (1924–2021)

- Born: 9 September 1924; Odessa, Ukraine
- Died: 6 May 2021 (aged 96)
- Education: Academy of Fine Arts (1943-1948); École du Meuble, Montreal (1955-1956); etching at Musée des Beaux-arts de Montreal (1958-1959)
- Known for: graphic artist
- Spouse: Pierre Gloor

Luba Genush (9 September 1924 – 6 May 2021) was a Canadian multidisciplinary artist of Ukrainian origin. Throughout her career she practiced printmaking and painting, as well as mixed media, drawing, ceramics, computer art, and "collagraphs," which are described, as "collaged and cannibalized prints reprinted to form a new print."

== Career ==
A native of Odessa, Genush began her studies at the School of Fine Arts in Kyiv, where she studied from 1938 until 1941. In 1942, her family emigrated to Vienna, Austria. There, Genush attended the Academy of Fine Arts from 1943 to 1948. In 1948, she emigrated to Montreal, Canada, where she studied ceramics as a pupil of J. Cartier at the École du Meuble from 1955 to 1956. From 1958 to 1959 she studied etching at the Musée des Beaux-arts de Montreal. Her work with computer generated images, concerned with the relationship between humans and technology, has been featured in exhibitions with the National Gallery of Canada, the Montreal Museum of Fine Arts, and the Museum of History in Gatineau, Quebec. In addition to showing in North America, Genush's work was also featured in exhibitions that have travelled abroad, such as in Montreal-Moscow. Her work is included in the collection of the National Gallery of Canada.

Genush was married to Pierre Gloor, a Swiss-born neurologist, until his death; the couple had two children. She lived and worked in Montreal. Genush died in May 2021, at the age of 96.
