= Ljubica =

- Gender: female
- Language: Slavic

Origin
- Meaning: l'ub (love)
- Region of origin: Slavic

Other names
- Nickname: Ljuba
- Related names: Ljubomir

Ljubica (Serbian Cyrillic: Љубица and Macedonian: Љубица) is a Slavic feminine given name meaning "love" or "kiss", where -ica is a diminutive suffix. Also, ljubica means violet, while the actual flower is ljubičica, a superdiminutive. It is Serbo-Croatian in origin, used throughout the former Yugoslavia.

== Variants ==
- Bulgarian: Lyubitsa, Любица
- Slovak: Ľubica

== Notable people ==
- Ljubica Acevska (born 1957), Macedonian diplomat
- Ljubica Čakarević (1894–1980), Serbian combatant
- Ljubica Drljača (born 1978), Serbian basketball coach and player
- Ljubica Ivošević Dimitrov (1884–1933), Serbian-Bulgarian textile worker, activist, newspaper editor and poet
- Ljubica Janković (1894–1974), Serbian ethnomusicologist
- Ljubica Jelušič (born 1960), Slovenian politician
- Ljubica Jembrih (born 1974), Croatian politician
- Ljubica Luković (1858–1915), Serbian nurse, social worker, teacher and translator
- Ljubica Marić (1909–2003), Serbian composer
- Ljubica Mrdaković Todorović (born 1962), Serbian doctor and politician
- Ljubica Nenezić (born 1997), Montenegrin handball player
- Ljubica Ostojić (1945–2021), Bosnian poet, writer and playwright
- Ljubica Otašević (1933–1998), Serbian actress, body double and basketball player
- Ljubica Sokić (1914–2009), Serbian painter
- Ljubica Štefan (1921–2002), Croatian historian
- Ljubica Vukomanović (1788–1843), Serbian Princess consort
- Ljubica Živković (1936–2017), Serbian chess player

== See also ==
- Ljuba (name)
- Ljubomir (given name)
