= Ljubiša Petruševski =

Ljubiša Petruševski (died August 31, 2002) was a Serbian oboist and the Dean of the Faculty of Music in Belgrade.

== Education ==
He was born in Kumanovo, Socialist Republic of Macedonia. He graduated from the Belgrade Music Academy in 1965 as one of the best students, and continued his education in Paris.

== Performance career ==
A prizewinner at many competitions, he played as a soloist and principal oboist of the Belgrade Philharmonic Orchestra, the Belgrade Opera, and the Radio Television of Serbia Symphony Orchestra.

== Teaching career ==
Mr. Petruševski was Professor of Oboe at the Faculty of Music in Belgrade.

He died in Belgrade, Serbia.
