= Lyubomir Nikolov Vladikin =

Lubomir N. Vladikin (Bulgarian: Любомир Н. Владикин) a jurist, writer, and Bulgarian nationalist of the 20th century.

== Biography ==
=== Early life ===
Vladikin was born on September 3, 1891, in the village of Golyamo Belovo, Pazardzhik area. His mother, Maria Morfova, sister of the opera singer Hristina Morfova and the composer Aleksandar Morfov, studied French Philology in Geneva. His father, Nikola Yonkov Vladikin, was a well-known journalist, scholar, writer, publicist, historian and political activist. Over the period from 1890 to 1912 he was an MP for three consecutive terms. He was a nephew of the Bishop of South Bulgaria (from Ohrid to Edirne), known under the church name Evstatiy Pelagoniyski.

Lubomir Vladikin graduated a classical high school in Sofia in 1910, then studied law and government science at the Sofia University, where he graduated in 1915.

During the First World War he served continuously in the Bulgarian Army on the Southern Front.

Since 1910 he participated in literary circles, wrote poetry, literary essays and publicism. His companions were the young writers Dimcho Debelyanov, Hristo Yasenov, Dimitar Stilyanovski, Nikolay Liliev, Kiril Hristov, Lyudmil Valchanov, Georgi Konstantinov, etc. In 1920 he became a regular member of the Union of Bulgarian Writers and in 1925 he was appointed secretary of the union.

=== Studies and works in the 1920s–1930s ===
From 1921 to 1924 he specialized in Vienna, Würzburg and Prague, covering his expenses on his own. In 1924 he became a Doctor in State Science of the University of Würzburg and a Doctor in Economic Sciences of the University of Vienna.

From 1924 to 1928 he worked as a financial expert at the Bulgarian National Bank. During this period he published numerous studies and articles on financial matters and business management. He participated in the financial stabilization program of Bulgaria and was the co-author of the "Exchange monopoly" economic system.

From 1925 to 1928 he published many books in the field of state and constitutional law. In 1927 the famous art-history book "Tsarevgrad Tarnovo" was published and was highly appreciated by the Bulgarian public.

On July 11, 1928, he became a full-time Associate Professor in the Department of General State and Bulgarian constitutional law at the Faculty of Law, and on 21. January 1932 he became a professor in the same department.

During the period from 1930 to 1934 he wrote a series of books about the constitutions of Romania and Greece from the previous century, and on the new constitutions of Yugoslavia and Austria. For this work he was awarded the title of "associate member" of the Academies of Sciences of Romania, Yugoslavia, Greece and Austria. He was awarded higher orders by the heads of state of the above countries.

In 1932 he won the competition for outstanding scientists of the "Rockefeller Foundation" for Southeast Europe and went to Italy and France, where he stayed for two years. In Italy he published works on state and administrative law, as well as in business studies. He worked with the prominent Slavist and Bulgarianist Enrico Damiani and his school. Due to his contributions to the scientific and cultural cooperation between Italy and Bulgaria, he was awarded by King Victor Emmanuel with the nobility title “comandatore” and was appointed a corresponding member of the Italian Academy of Sciences. In France he published several studies, the most important of which was "The French business council" and received the title "licentiate" of law at the Sorbonne.

From 1933 to 1934 he was the dean of the Faculty of Law at the Sofia University. In 1934 he became an honorary professor at the Free University, where he taught financial and economic sciences. The next year he became a member of the Association of Bulgarian economists academics. The same year he became part of the management of the Jurists academics.

During the period 1935–1938, he wrote a series of books, including "History of the Tarnovo Constitution," "Political Structure of the United States and Development of Modern Democracy", "Council of State", etc. Later on he published his fundamental legal works "Theory of state " and "Organization of the Democratic State."

On June 21, 1938, he became the head of the Department of General State and Constitutional Law and once again the Dean of the Faculty of Law in 1937–1938. Throughout this period he was a lecturer in "General State and Constitutional Law", "Legal Structure and Management of the Modern State”, “Succession to the Throne as a Public Law Institute", "Personality and State," "State and Economy." On December 8, 1938, he gave a speech at the grand celebration of the 50th anniversary of the Sofia University.

=== Last years ===
In 1938-1941 he published "La politique arts et science", "Sur 1f ras de Schiller" and "Tirnovo la ville de rois" in French with forewords by Prof. Mihail Arnaudov, Nikolay Donchev and Georgi Konstantinov. This earned him the title honorary doctor of the French Academy and the Order of Cultural Merits.

At the beginning of 1939 he travelled to Norway, where he presented a cycle of lectures on legal studies and was awarded the title "Honorary doctor" of the University of Oslo.

During the period 1939–1942, he published the "Goethe and Schiller in Weimar" (Berlin, 1941), "Theodore Kyorner and Hristo Botev" (Berlin, Sofia, 1942), "Die politische Entwickling Bulgariens" (Budapest, 1942) in German and "L'Eterno nel dirito naturale" (Roma, 1940) in Italian.

Between 1934 and 1944, he was the vice president of the Institute of International Studies, chairman of the Italian-Bulgarian cultural cooperation, vice-chairman of the Bulgarian-German Cultural Society. He participated in the management bodies of the cultural associations France - Bulgaria, Japan - Bulgaria and Slovakia - Bulgaria. He spoke German, French, Italian and Russian. He was fluent in English, Serbo-Croatian and Slovak.

Throughout his life Lyubomir Vladikin has never been a member of any political party. In 1938 he was nominated Minister of national education, but he did not accept the position. In 1942 he refused to enter the government of Bogdan Filov.

In the beginning of 1944 Lyubomir Vladikin was subjected to a prolonged treatment in Vienna, where he returned once again in the end of August 1944. Following the events of September 9, 1944, he did not come back to Bulgaria. He was removed from his position as a professor at the Sofia University and the Free University, from the scientists academics. He was also expelled from the Union of Bulgarian Journalists and the Union of Bulgarian Writers.

He died on May 22, 1948, in the city of Rosenheim, near Munich, Germany.

On December 10, 1991, in the Veliko Tarnovo University "St. St. Cyril and Methodius" a scientific session was held for the 100th anniversary of Prof. Dr. Lyubomir Vladikin.
