= Miroljub Jovanović =

Serbian medical doctor and politician

Miroljub Jovanović (Serbian Cyrillic: Мирољуб Јовановић; born 7 July 1944) is a Serbian medical doctor and politician. He was a member of the Serbian parliament from 1991 to 1993 and has served as the mayor of Babušnica. Jovanović was a member of the Socialist Party of Serbia (SPS) during his parliamentary term but later left the party. In his final term as mayor, he was a member of Nebojša Čović's Social Democratic Party (SDP).

== Early life and private career ==
Jovanović was born in Babušnica toward the end of the Bulgarian occupation of southern Serbia in War II. After the war, he was raised in the People's Republic of Serbia in the Federal People's Republic of Yugoslavia. He graduated from the University of Niš Faculty of Medicine and later completed his specialization in internal medicine at the same institution.

== Politician ==
=== Socialist Party of Serbia ===
Jovanović joined the Socialist Party of Serbia on its formation in 1990. He was elected to the Serbian parliament in the 1990 parliamentary election for the electoral division of Babušnica and Dimitrovgrad and took his seat when the assembly convened in early 1991. The Socialists won a landslide majority with 194 out 250 seats, and Jovanović served as a government supporter. He was not a candidate for re-election in the 1992 parliamentary election. Jovanović was also the president (i.e., speaker) of the Babušnica municipal assembly from 1992 to 1996, a position that was at the time equivalent to mayor.

=== Social Democratic Party ===
Serbia introduced the direct election of mayors for the 2004 Serbian local elections. Jovanović was elected as the mayor of Babušnica, defeating Zoran Spasić of the Socialist Party in the second round of voting. In this campaign, Jovanović held a dual endorsement from the People's Democratic Party (NDS) and the Democratic Alternative (DA); the DA subsequently merged into the Social Democratic Party, and he served as a member of that party.

In 2006, Jovanović signed a deal with the Serbian ministry of energy for the Niš–Sofia gas pipeline to pass through his municipality. In August of the following year, he signed an agreement with the Israeli company MDSE on the gasification of the municipality.

The local assembly of Babušnica became dysfunctional in late 2006, and a temporary administration was established in the municipality by the Serbian government. As Jovanović was a directly elected mayor, his position was not threatened.

Babušnica was hit by catastrophic floods toward the end of Jovanović's tenure as mayor, and he was responsible for leading a recovery effort.

The direct election of mayors proved to be a short-lived experiment and was abandoned in 2008; since then, Serbian mayors have been chosen by the elected members of the country's city and municipal assemblies. The SDP was largely dormant by this time and ceased to exist two years later.

=== Since 2012 ===
For the 2012 Serbian local elections, Jovanović led a coalition electoral list of the Serbian Renewal Movement (SPO), the Movement of Workers and Peasants (PRS), and his own citizens' group. The list won five seats out of thirty-seven in the municipal assembly. In September 2013, he was appointed to the supervisory board of the public utility Regionalna deponija Pirot.

The SPO contested the 2016 local elections in Babušnica on a coalition list with the Serbian Progressive Party (SNS). Jovanović appeared in the fifth position and was re-elected when the list won eight seats. The SNS formed a coalition government after the election, and he served as a government supporter. He was not a candidate for re-election in 2020.

== Electoral record ==
=== Local (Babušnica) ===
2004 Babušnica municipal election: Mayor of Babušnica
Candidate	Party	First round		Second round	
Candidate	Party	Votes	%	Votes	%
Miroljub Jovanović	People's Democratic Party–Democratic Alternative (Affiliation: Democratic Alternative)			4,395	56.79
Zoran Spasić	Socialist Party of Serbia			3,344	43.21
Predrag Živković	Serbian Radical Party				
other candidates					
Total				7,739	100.00

=== National Assembly of Serbia ===
1990 Serbian parliamentary election: Babušnica and Dimitrovgrad
Candidate	Party
Dr. Miroljub Jovanović (***WINNER***)	Socialist Party of Serbia
Asen Ivanov	Serbian Renewal Movement
Mihail Ivanov	Citizens' Group
Georgi Kostov	Citizens' Group
Dragoslav Manić	Citizens' Group
Dejan Ristić	Democratic Party
Total
