= Lubomír Přibyl =

Czech painter and printmaker

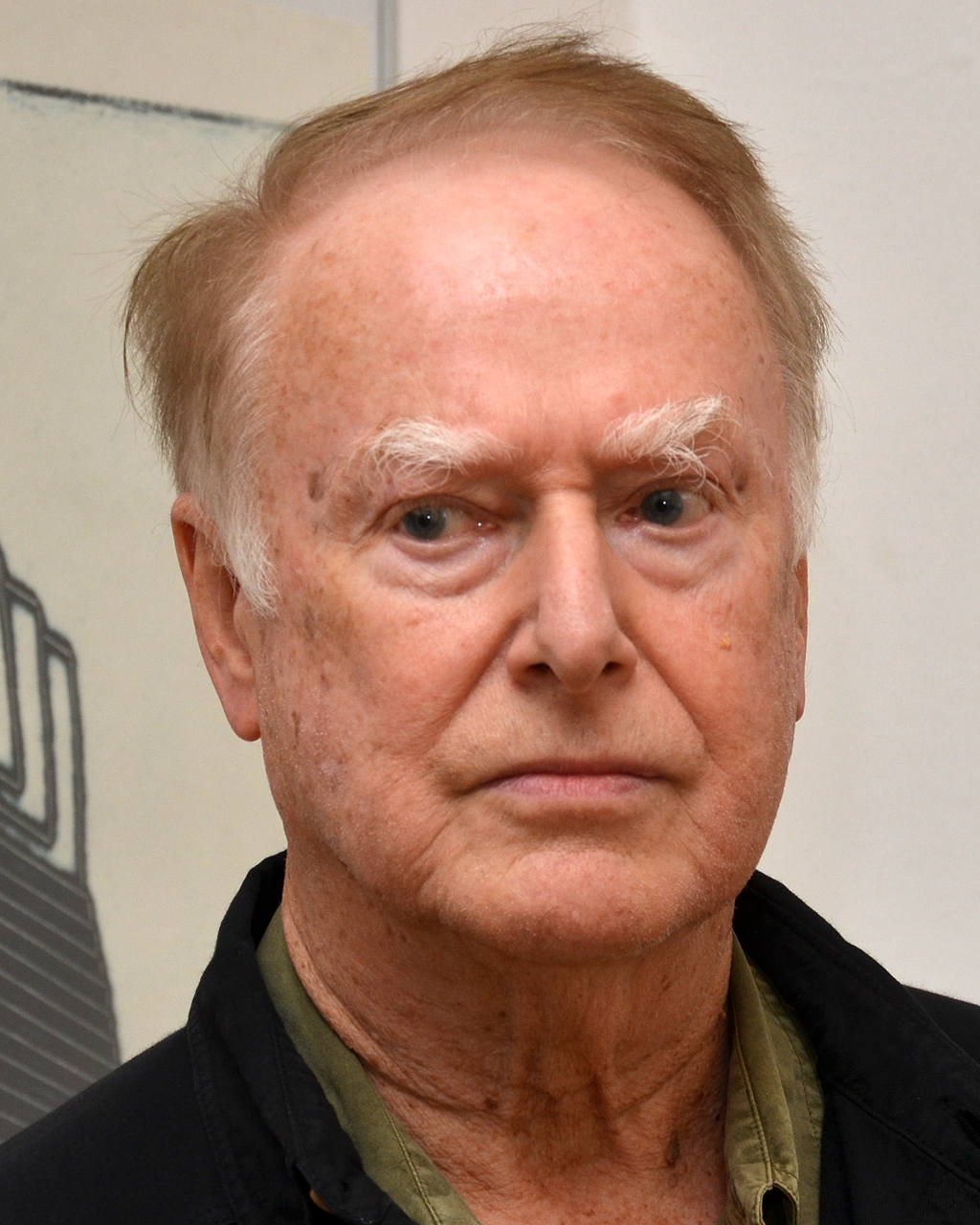
- Lubomír Přibyl (2017)
- Born: 27 June 1937 (age 89)
- Education: Academy of Fine Arts in Prague (1 year)
- Awards: Vladimír Boudník Award, Inter-Kontakt-Grafik Foundation (2006), Complimentary lifetime Artist membership of Philadelphia Museum of Art
- Website: Lubomír Přibyl Lubomír Přibyl website

Lubomír Přibyl (born 27 June 1937, Prague) is a Czech painter and printmaker.

== Life ==
In 1952-1957 he graduated from the Václav Hollar Secondary Art School, where he was taught by Prof. Zdeněk Balaš, Karel Müller and Karel Tondl. In 1957 he passed the entrance examination to the Academy of Fine Arts in Prague (prof. Vlastimil Rada), but the academic teaching did not satisfy him and after a year of study he was expelled for lack of interest. Among his classmates were the creators of Czech informel, who influenced him in his choice of non-traditional art materials.

In 1959 he met Jiří Kolář and Běla Kolářová. For the next two years he worked in the promotional department of the ČKD Devices factory in Vysočany, where he met Vladimír Boudník and Josef Hampl. He first exhibited solo in 1959 at the Rokoko Theatre and in the same year with V. Boudník in the ČKD factory canteen. During his employment at the factory, he had the opportunity to visit the regime's heavily guarded testing room in Běchovice, equipped with high-voltage generators. Lubomír Přibyl then became more deeply interested in light phenomena, physical and geometrical laws and technology.

In 1961, together with V. Boudník, J. Istler and R. Fremund participated in the Ljubljana Biennial, where his graphic sheet from the Mythy series was selected for publication by the International Graphic Arts Society in New York. In Prague, Přibyl was visited by foreign gallerists from Paris, Baden-Baden and Curaçao in the Netherlands and invited to exhibit his work. In 1963 he became a member of the Hollar Society. From 1964 he participated in exhibitions at the Pratt Graphic Art Center in New York. He won an award at the 1963 Ljubljana Biennial and his prints from the 1965 Biennial were purchased by the Library of Congress in Washington, D.C. In late 1964, Pribyl's group exhibition was held at the Fronta Gallery in Prague.

In 1966-1968 he was represented in Prague by Galerie Platýz (Ludmila Vachtová) and in Germany by Klaus Staeck, who published several of his prints and exhibited Pribyl's works in galleries in Mannheim and Heidelberg. In Paris, Galerie Lambert and Galerie Arnaud exhibited his works, and in the USA, since the 1960s, Jacques Baruch Gallery, Chicago. In 1968 he exhibited at the Biennial in Buenos Aires. The International Graphic Arts Society in New York published another of Pribyl's prints and the Pratt Graphic Art Center offered him a solo exhibition.

After the Warsaw Pact invasion of Czechoslovakia, he lost the opportunity to exhibit in Czechoslovakia, but was invited to exhibit abroad and participated in exhibitions of Czech graphic art organized by Czech curators in exile (Arsén Pohribný, Libuše Brožková). In 1982 the publisher Limited Edition in New York published his graphic sheet. In the early 1980s, Pribyl participated in three unofficial exhibitions in Brno (curated by J. Valoch), OKD Prague 9 (curated by A. Potůčková) and the Jazz Section (Krabičky, curated by Joska Skalník). In 1989 he had a solo exhibition at the Institute of macromolecular chemistry of the Czechoslovak Academy of Sciences in Petřiny (curator Jiří Šetlík).

After 1989 Lubomír Pribyl exhibited regularly at home and abroad, since 1998 also with the re-established Concretist's Club. His retrospective exhibitions have been organized by Gallery of Fine Arts in Cheb (2001), Regional Gallery in Liberec (2005), Gallery of Modern Art in Hradec Králové (2011), Brno Gallery CZ (2011) and Topičův klub, Prague (2012).

=== Awards ===
- 1963 Honorable mention, 5th International Graphic Biennial Ljubljana
- 1964 Triennale fur farbige Original-Graphik, Grenchen
- 1996 International Biennale Facing the Values, Galerie Confaktor, Katowice
- 2003 Grafix 2003, Břeclav
- 2006 Vladimír Boudník Award, Inter-Kontakt-Grafik Foundation
- 2008 Graphics of the Year
- 2011 Graphic of the Year
- 2015 Graphic of the Year
- 2017 Complimentary lifetime Artist membership of Philadelphia Museum of Art

== Work ==
Lubomír Přibyl is a solitary artist on the Czech art scene who has no direct predecessors and whose consistently monochromatic work is close only to some members of the Zero art group. His exclusivity also lies in the way he consistently addresses an autonomous artistic problem using endless variations of the chosen means. His work is rarely internally coherent and unmistakable in comparison to domestic and foreign art. He is often classified as part of a broader stream of "new sensibility" that uses the language of geometry but modifies it and fills it with new meanings. The discovery of new aesthetic phenomena and qualities, which characterizes the whole range of geometric art in the 1960s, is associated in Lubomír Přibyl's work with certain conceptual features and the establishment of new conceptual relations.

At the beginning of his career as a painter, he briefly dealt with the stylized figure and zoomorphic and geometric shapes (Spherical Configuration, 1959, Spatial Diagonal, 1960), but soon became interested in the aesthetic qualities of non-traditional materials. His visual experience with the apparatus and electrical discharges in the high-voltage testing facility in Běchovice manifested itself in his later work in a typologically new minimalist approach to the image and the graphic page, through which he sought to capture the dynamic relationships of geometric formations.

Pribyl's monochromatic black and white compositions are often organized symmetrically along a diagonal or vertical axis. Initially, he used the rough texture of jute and sand for his material prints (Spatial Diagonal, 1961, 1962). In 1963-1964 he temporarily abandoned geometric shapes and assembled his matrices for material prints from crumpled paper and sand (Paper Diagonal, 1964). Simultaneously, he created compositions on plywood using only sand cemented with oil paint (Spatial Configuration of 4 Segments, 1963, Segmented Diagonal, 1965).

Material prints with sand from 1964 to 1974 are characterized by sharp contrasts of white and black surfaces, as well as subtle transitions of light and structured shadows, and gradually evolve to increasingly complex geometric formations (Spatial Configuration of Two Parabolas and Two Segments, 1964).

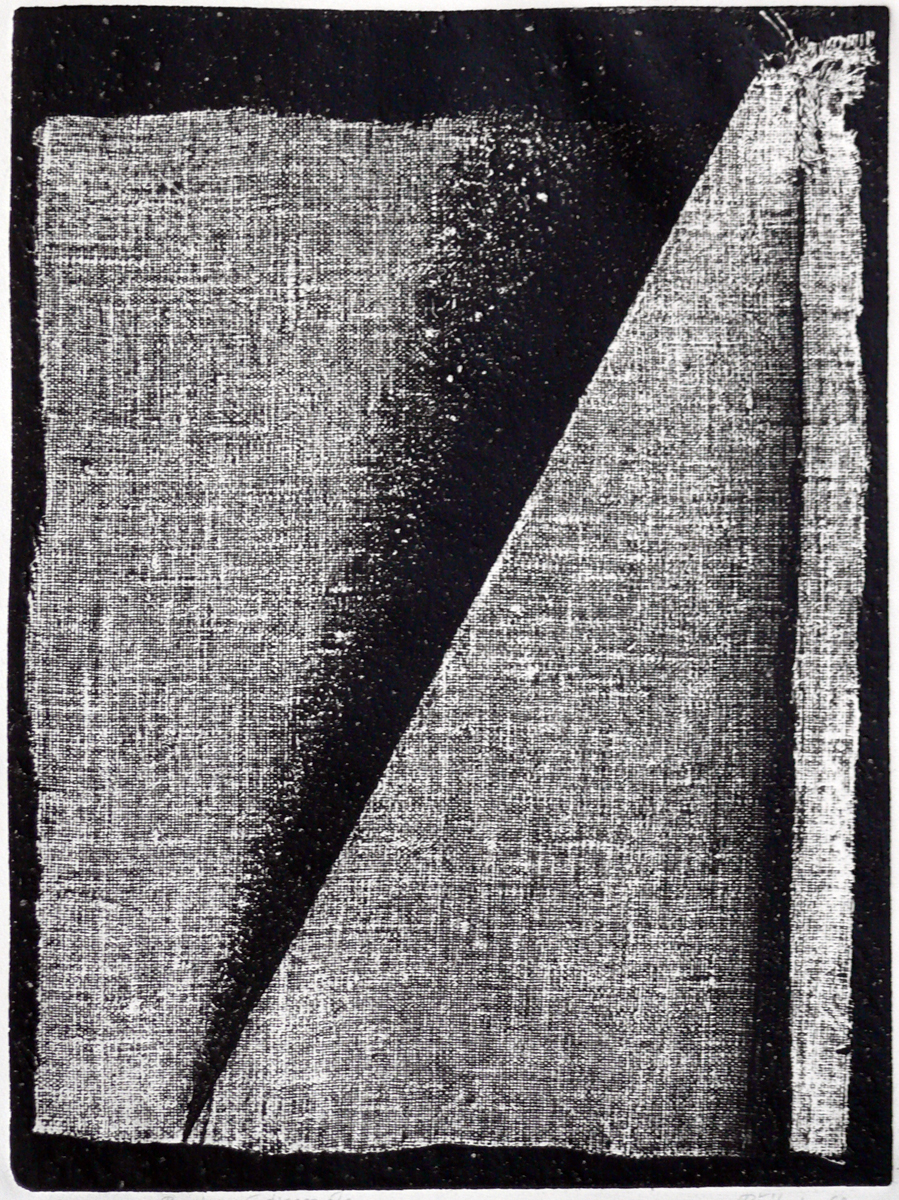
Rag Spatial Diagonal, collography, 1962

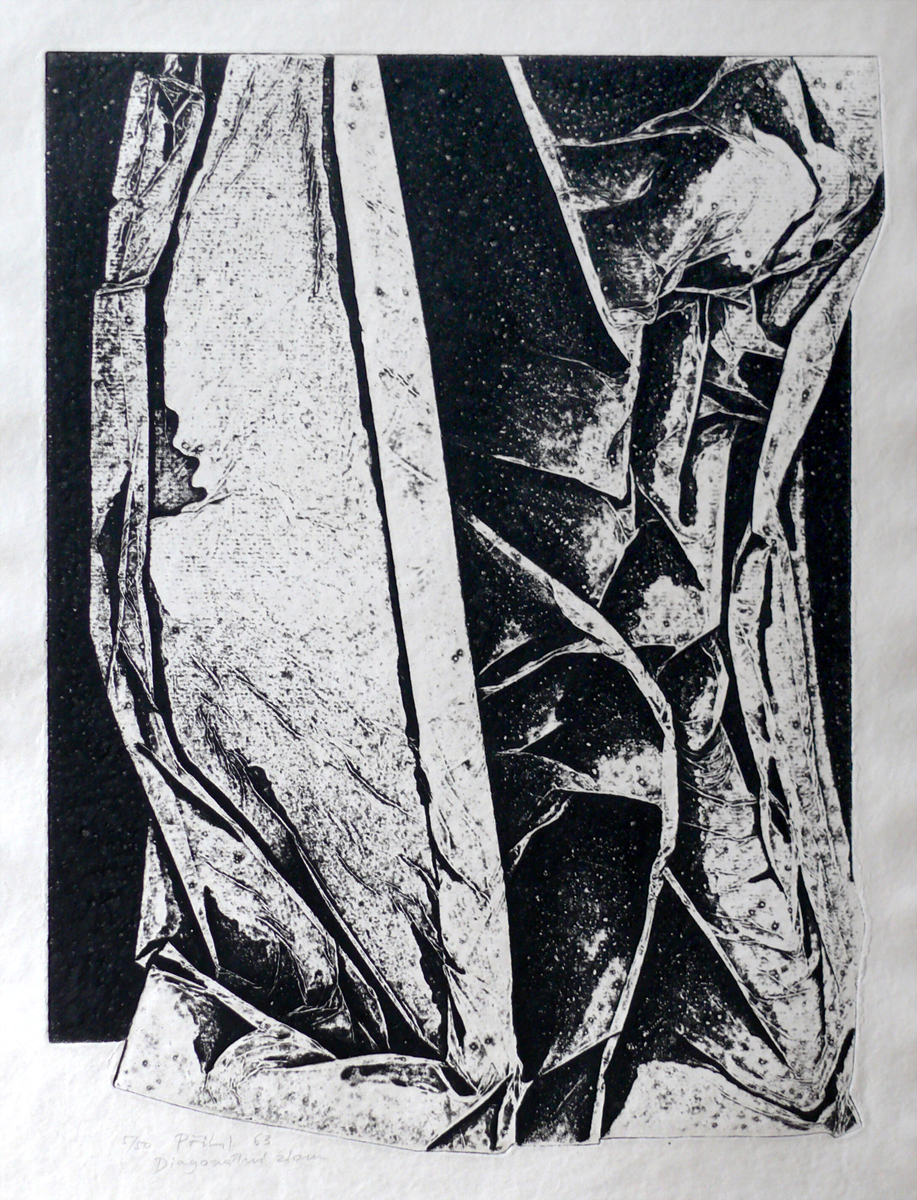
Diagonal Break, collography, 1963

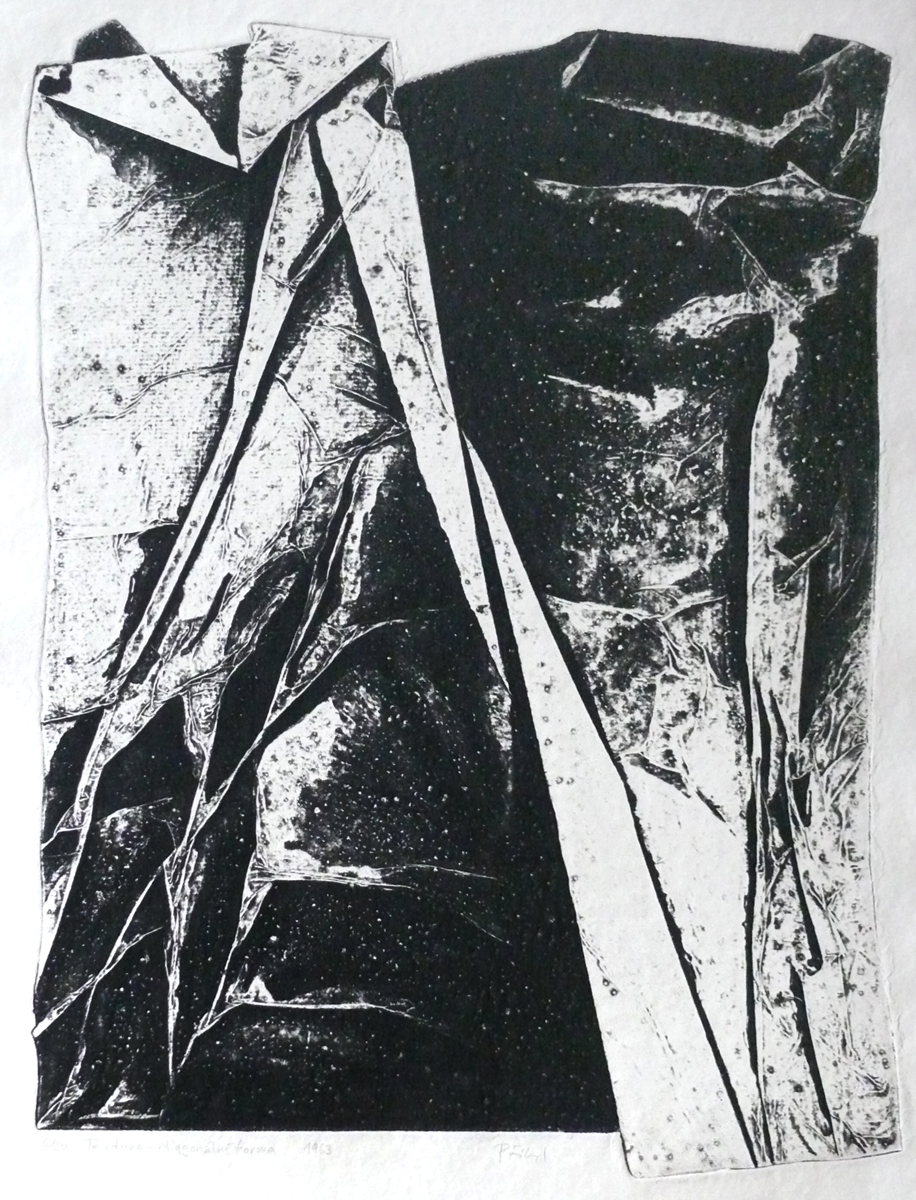
Two Spikes in a Diagonal, collography, 1963

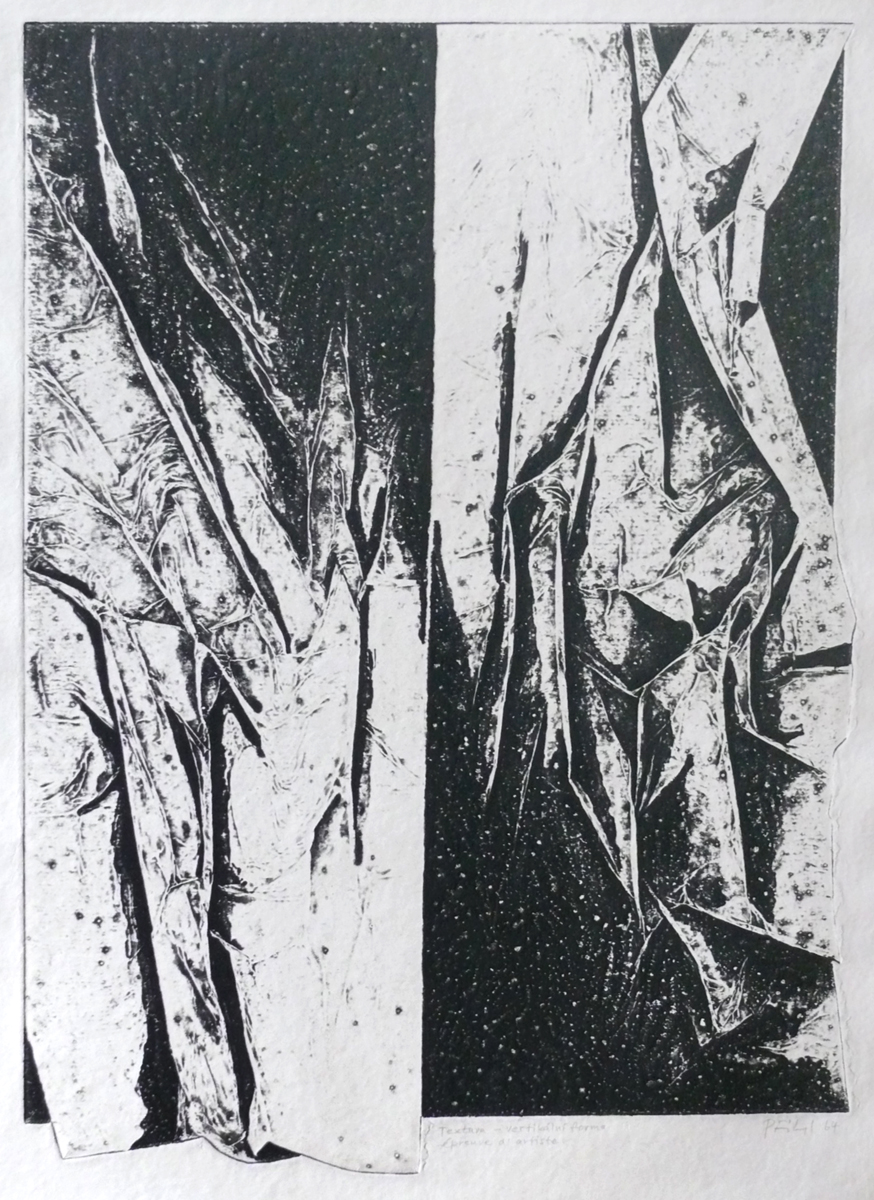
Paper vertical, collography, 1963

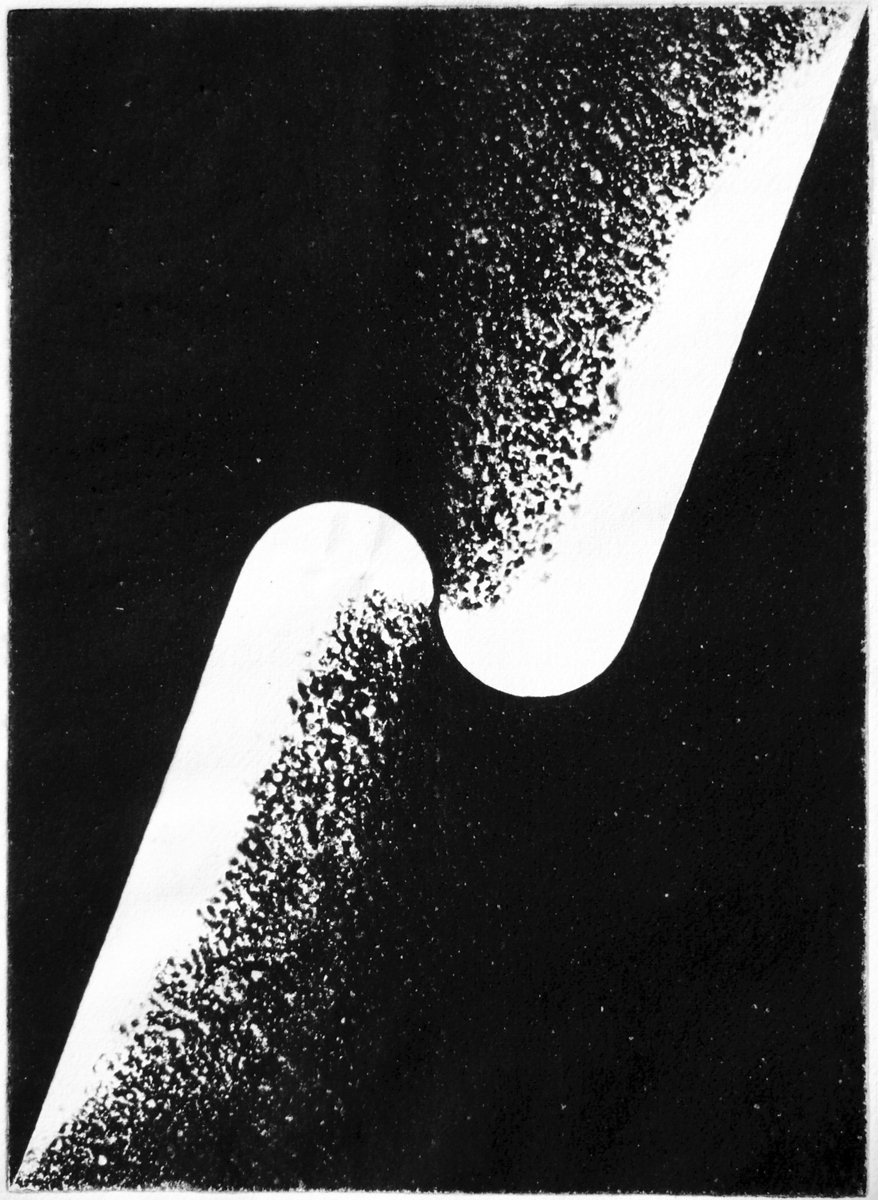
Sand segment diagonal, collography, 1963

In 1962, he incorporated ropes, textiles and regular grids created by loosely laid or stretched fishing nets into his compositions (Found Net, 1964). The finished net did not offer many other variations, so he began constructing the nets himself on a wooden board made of taut ropes threaded through pre-drilled holes. He created large-scale compositions on the borderline between image and object, with the net fixed with black lacquer (Six Variations of the Spatial Diagonal, 1967–1969, Bicentric Net, 1994, 162 x 122 cm). The refraction of light on the compact black surfaces of the oil painting or on the silver aluminium foils with which he sometimes covers the surface of the board offers a spatial illusion.

Some of the compositions have a strict geometric order (Balance, Two Spikes, 1964), others rely on the principle of randomness (Aleatoric Texture - Swirling, 1962). The new technique allowed the artist to create endless variations of geometric curves, where the smooth transitions of light into deep shadows create a local thickening of the rope matrix (Rotation Network, 1972, Double Segmented Break, 1981, Spherical Diagonal, 1993, Spherical Break, 1999). Some matrices capture the intersection of rotational surfaces (Rotation Surface, 1976), unfolded spatial plans of geometric surfaces and illusively projected three-dimensional solids (Intersecting Needles, 1976, Beveled Prisms, 1993, Spatial Plans, 1998, Rotating Spatial Plans, 2002), internal tension and torsion (Eccentric Network, 1994, Torsional Diagonal, 1997).

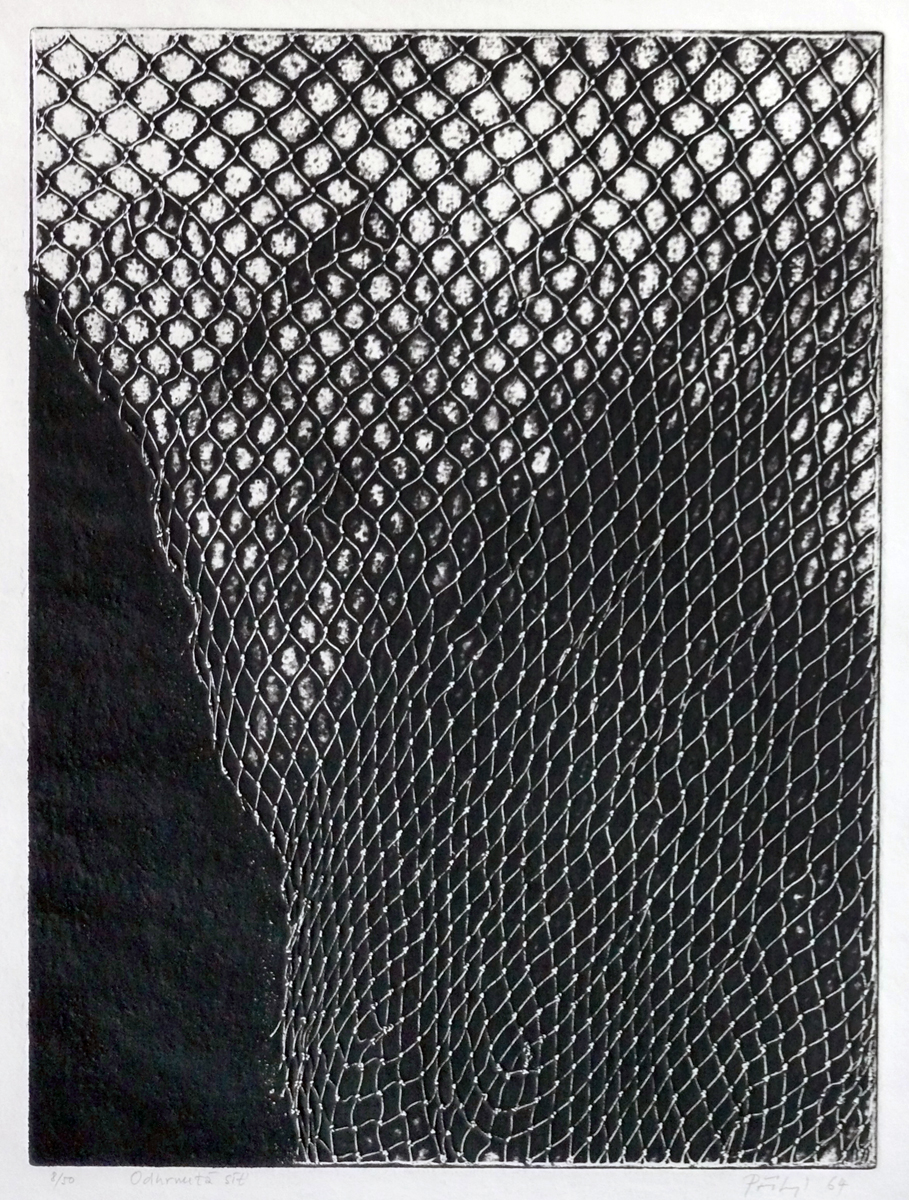
Unrolled Net from the series Found Nets, collography, 1964

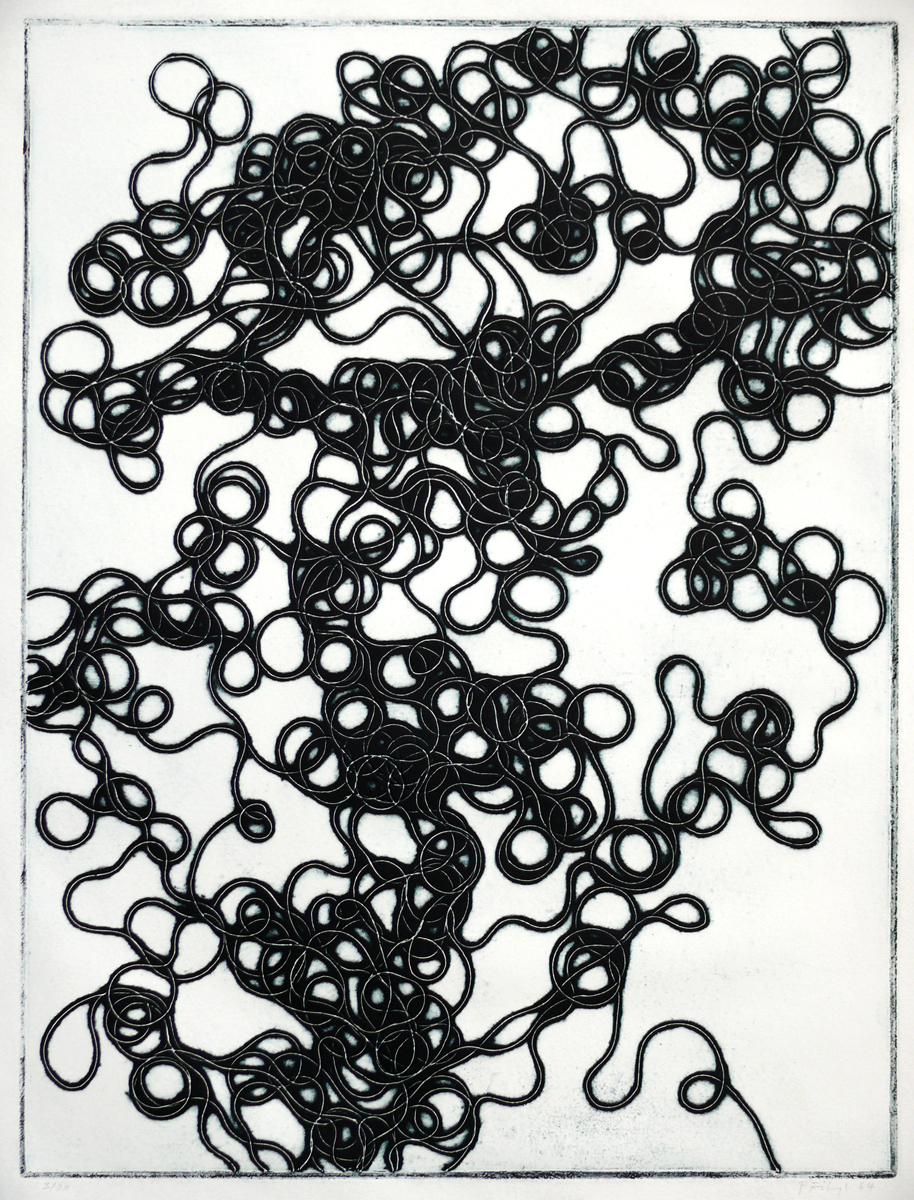
Swirling (Amorphous aleatory texture), collography, 1964

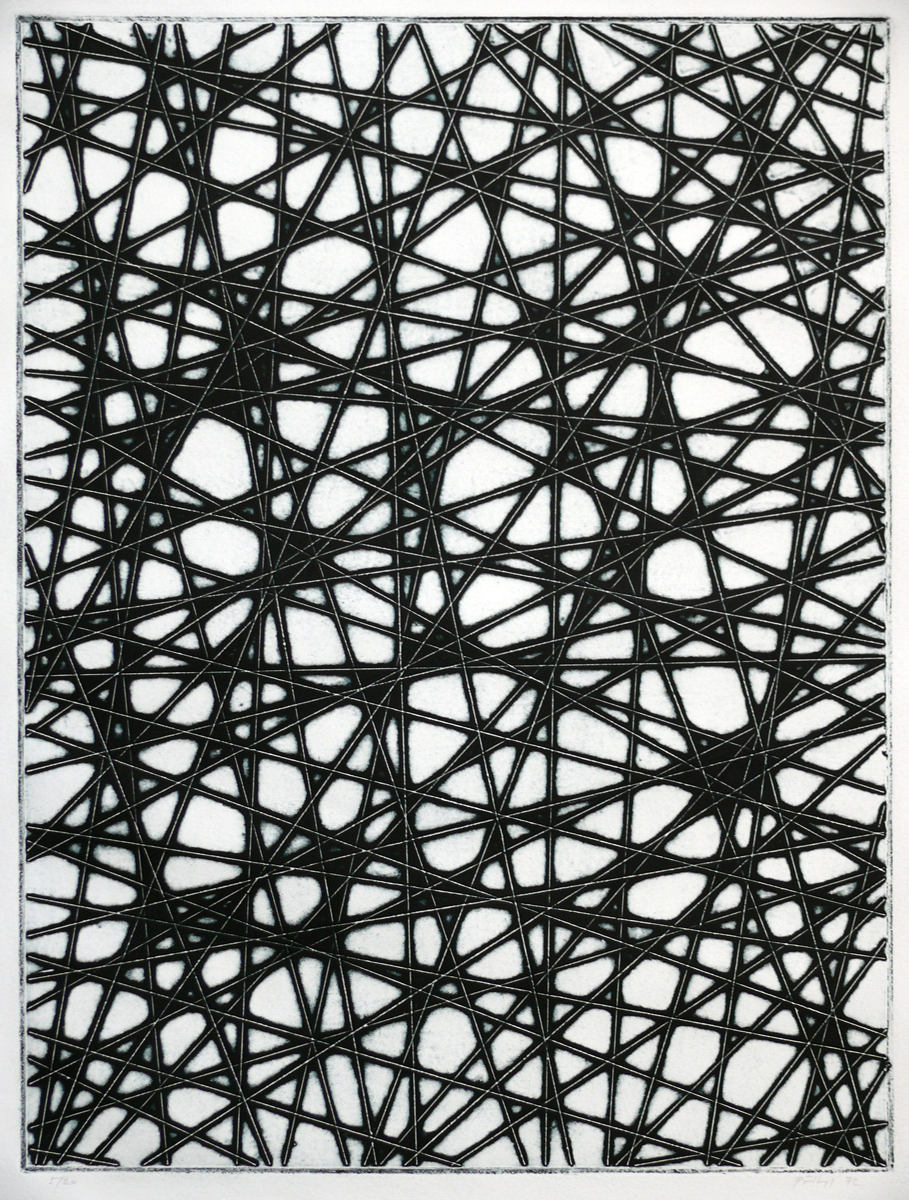
Aleatoric Network (Straight-lined), collography, 1972

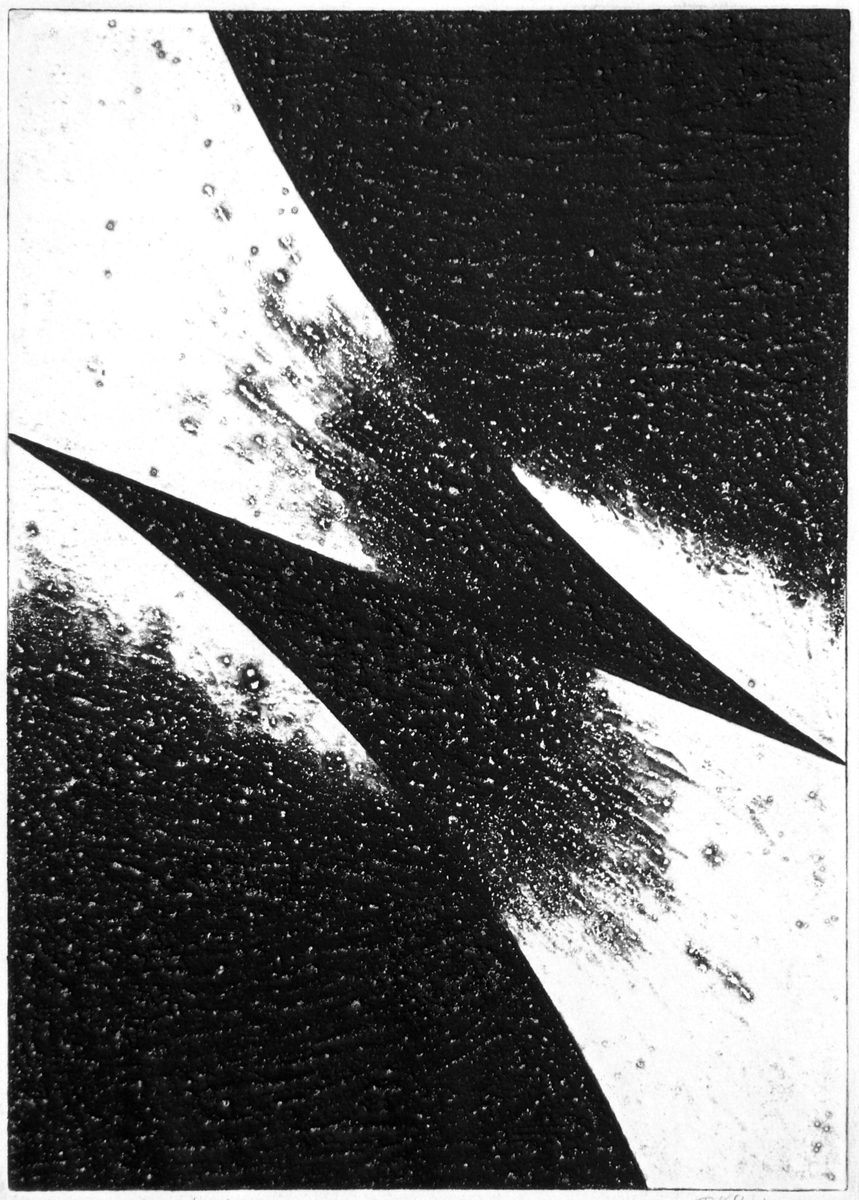
Two Spikes (Two Parabolas on the Diagonal), collograph, 1965

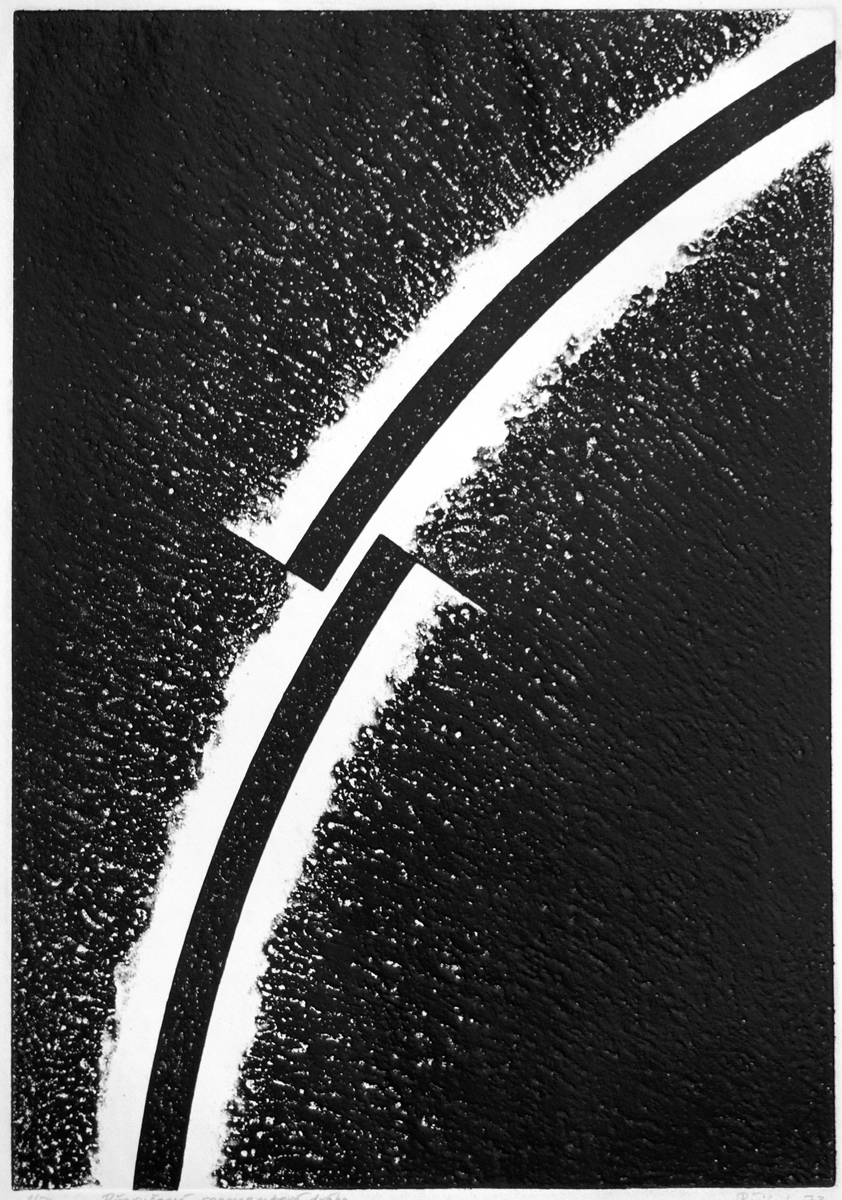
Interrupted segmented path, collography, 1973

Spatial relationships and the unfolding of geometric shapes in a series of precisely constructed sequences are Pribyl's main themes in the 1990s. They are characterised by a certain ambiguity, where it is impossible to decide whether they are an illusion of a spatial formation or just a certain configuration in the plain surface. The artist uses a computer to calculate some of his complex compositions. Mathematician Jiří Fiala has called Lubomir Pribyl's work "morphoscopy". This new term, which is the counterpart of Ian Stewart's mathematical "morphomatics", describes a technique of making shapes visible.

The artist prints graphic sheets as collography - material printing from depth. In it, the image grid is printed as light lines with a fine texture, bordered by an irregular line of black ink, while places where the grid of ropes converges and the matrix is thickened and holds more color are printed from depth as a black area. As the lines diverge, the amount of captured colour diminishes, which then frames only the rope matrix, leaving the areas in between white. The result of printing is not only a mathematically accurate geometric mesh, but also random variations caused by the structure of the material used and the colour captured by it.

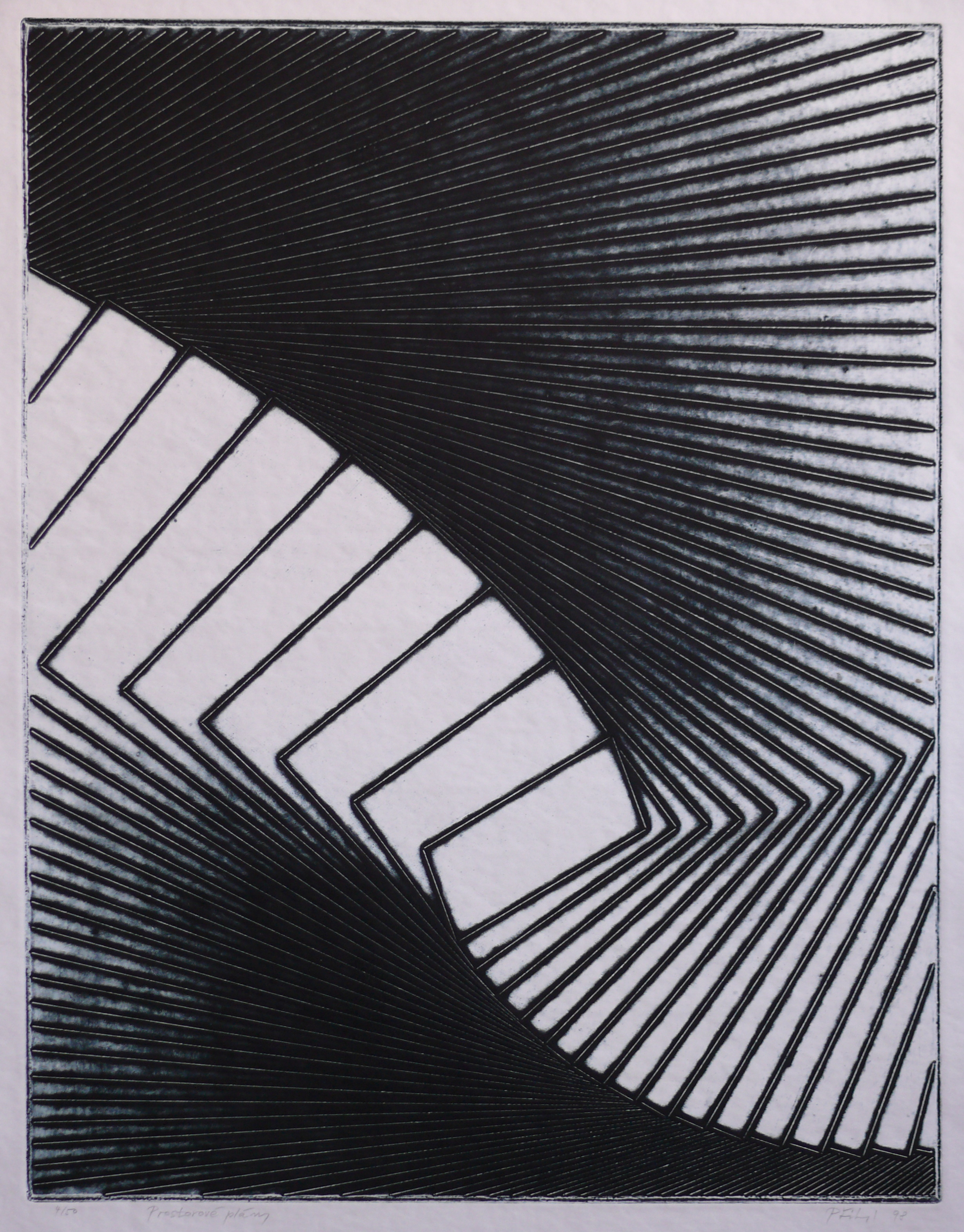
Space Plans, collography 1998

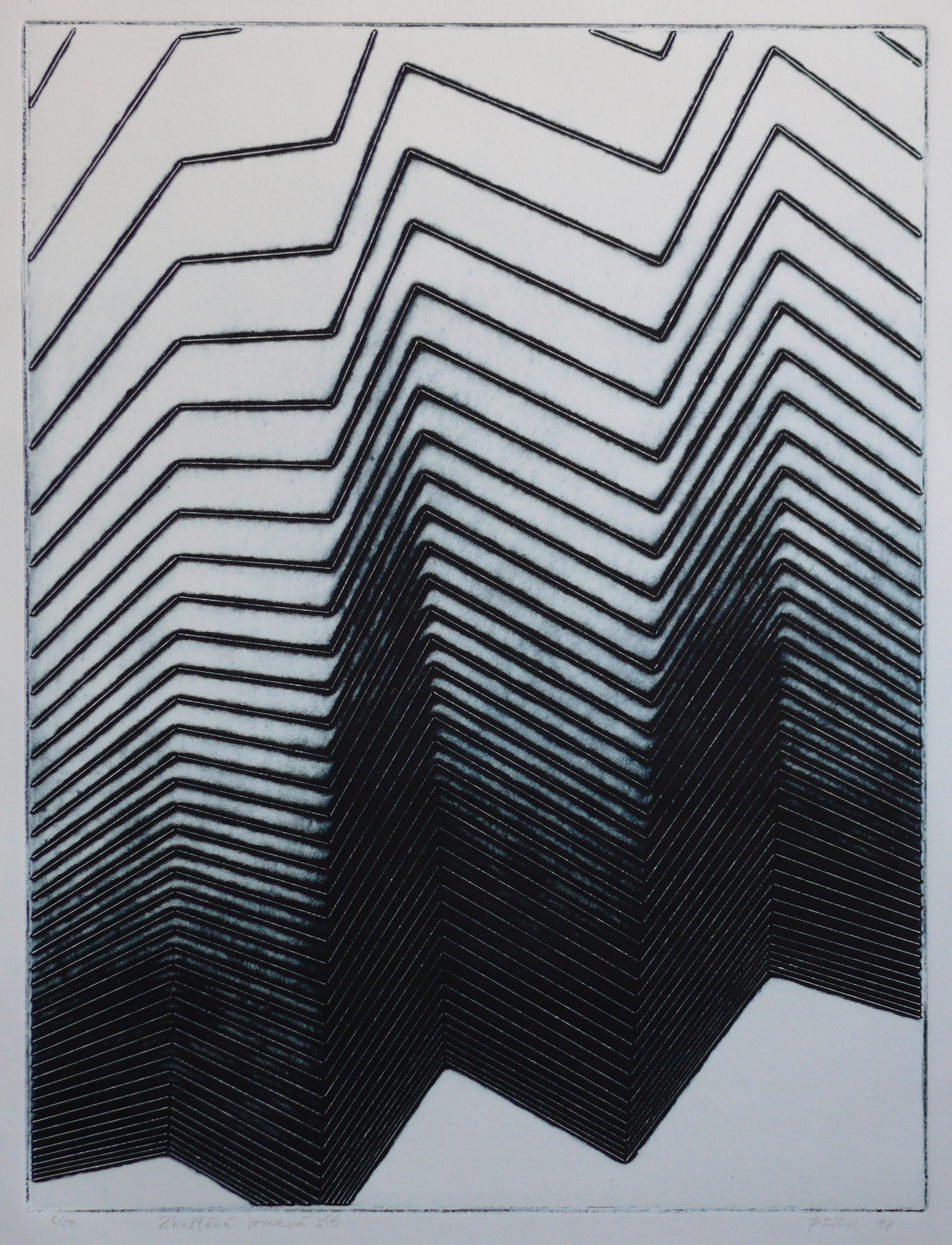
Thickened broken network, collography 1998

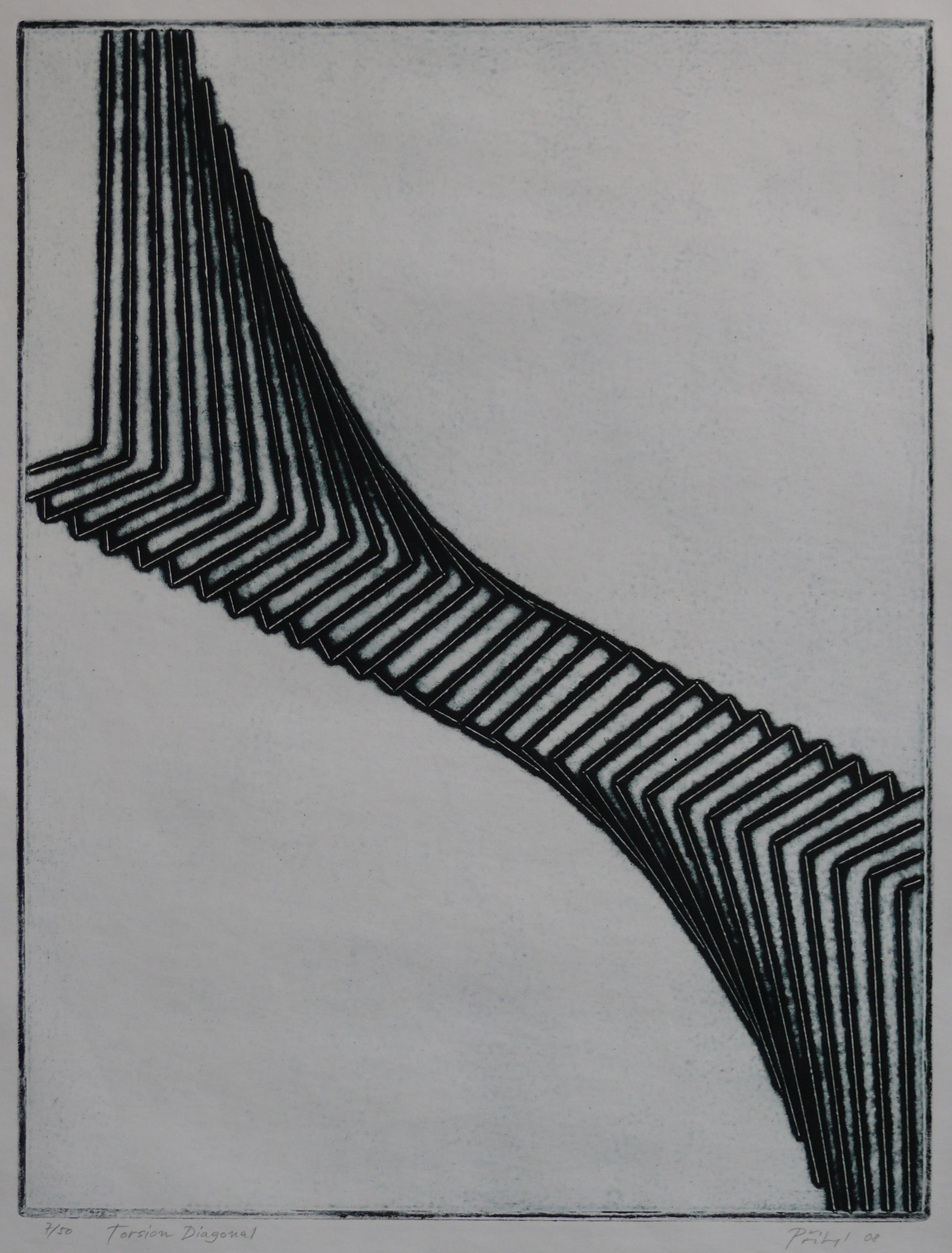
Torsal diagonal, collography 2008

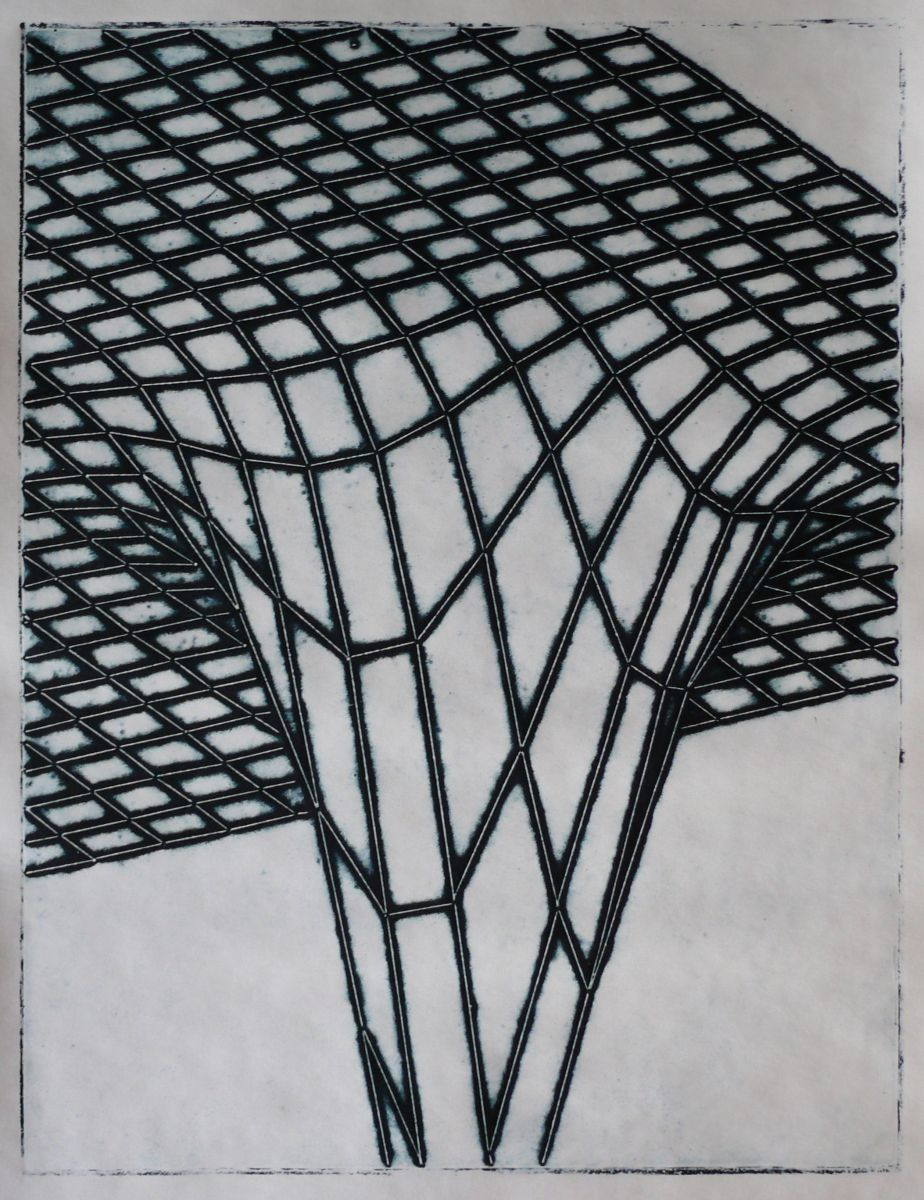
Spike, collography 2016

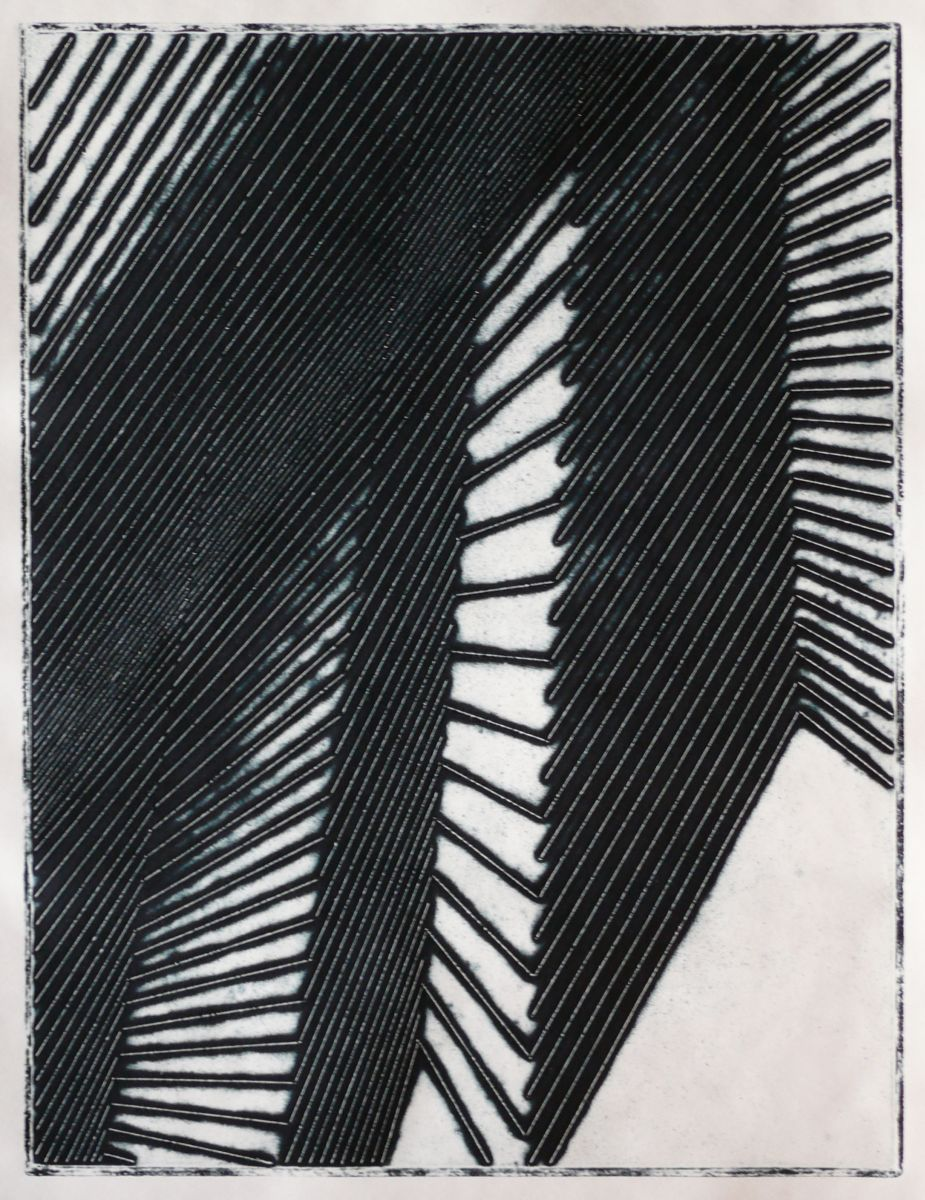
Broken net, collography 2016

Hans-Joachim Goller on Lubomír Přibyl: ...He's an individualist. His work is characterized by an unwavering clarity of order. He has a consistent geometric tension, their effect is in a steady sense of mathematical precision and the exclusion of all extraneous details.

=== Foreign editions of graphic sheets ===
- International Graphic Arts Society, New York 1962, 1968
- Edition Tangente, Heidelberg 1967, 1969, 1970
- Limited Edition, New York 1982

=== Representation in collections ===
- National Gallery in Prague
- International Graphic Arts Society, New York
- Pratt Graphic Center, New York
- National Gallery of Art, Washington D.C.
- Library of Congress, Washington D.C.
- Philadelphia Museum of Art
- Mead Art Museum, Amherst College, Massachusetts
- Cincinnati Art Museum
- Oregon State University, Corvallis
- Galerie Arnaud, Paris
- Galerie Lambert, Paris
- Le Musée d'Art et d'Histoire, Cholet
- Graphische Sammlung, Hamburg
- Galerie Tangente, Heidelberg
- Galerie Haus Metternich, Koblenz
- Haus der Modernen Kunst, Staufen-Grunern
- Guanlan Art Museum, Guanlan
- Museo Civico, Cremona
- Patrimonio Cultural, Madrid
- Moderna galerija, Ljubljana
- Museum of Contemporary Art, Skopje
- Maribor Art Gallery UGM (Maribor Art Gallery), Maribor
- Museum of Art in Łódź
- Stowarzyszenie Międzynarodowe Triennale Grafiki (International Print Triennial Society), Krakow
- Archdiocesan Museum Katowice
- Xántus János Múzeum, Györ
- Gallery of the Central Bohemian Region (GASK), Kutná Hora
- Museum Kampa - Jan and Meda Mládek Foundation, Prague
- Museum of Art Olomouc
- Gallery of Modern Art, Hradec Králové
- Regional Gallery in Liberec
- Regional Gallery of Highlands in Jihlava
- Gallery of Fine Arts in Cheb
- Geophysical Institute of the CAS, v.v.i., Prague
- City Museum and Gallery, Breclav
- Charles University, Prague

=== Selected exhibitions ===
- 1959 Lubomír Přibyl, Divadlo Rokoko, Praha
- 1960 Lubomír Přibyl: Obrazy a grafika z let 1952–1960, Divadlo E. F. Buriana, Praha
- 1962 Lubomír Přibyl, International Graphic Arts Society, New York
- 1963 Lubomír Přibyl, Divadlo Stanislava Kostky Neumanna, Praha
- 1963 Lubomír Přibyl: Grafické práce z let 1954–1962, Vlastivědné muzeum, Prostějov
- 1963 Lubomír Přibyl: Grafické práce z let 1954–1962, Vlastivědné muzeum, Olomouc
- 1964 Lubomír Přibyl, Gallery RG, Curaçao
- 1964 Lubomír Přibyl, Galerie Fronta, Praha
- 1965 Lubomír Přibyl, Galerie Lambert, Paříž
- 1965 Lubomír Přibyl, Viola, Praha
- 1967 Lubomír Přibyl, Galerie Platýz, Praha
- 1969 Lubomír Přibyl, Pratt Graphic Center, New York
- 1970 Lubomír Přibyl, Galerie Tangente, Heidelberg
- 1971 Lubomír Přibyl, Galerie Tangente, Mannheim
- 1972 Lubomír Přibyl, Gallery Internationale, New York
- 1974 Lubomír Přibyl, Stedelijke Openbare Bibliotheek Deventer
- 1976 Lubomír Přibyl, Centro d'Arte - Galleria Antelami, Parma
- 1989 Lubomír Přibyl, Galerie K, Praha
- 1989 Lubomír Přibyl: Práce z posledních let, Ústav makromolekulární chemie (ÚMCH), výstavní síň, Praha
- 1992 Lubomír Přibyl, Studio Della, Ostrava
- 1995 Lubomír Přibyl, Galerie Dílo, Ústí nad Labem
- 1995 Lubomír Přibyl: Obrazy a grafika, Galerie bratří Čapků, Praha
- 1998 Lubomír Přibyl, Galerie Goller, Selb
- 1999 Lubomír Přibyl: Morfomatické sítě, Lounská výstavní síň Telecom, Louny
- 2001 Lubomír Přibyl: Grafika 1959–1998, Galerie výtvarného umění v Chebu
- 2002 Lubomír Přibyl, Ašské kulturní středisko, Aš
- 2002 Lubomír Přibyl: Morfomatické sítě, Výběr grafiky z let 1964–2002, Galerie informačního centra Univerzity Palackého, Zbrojnice, Olomouc
- 2005 Lubomír Přibyl: Grafika 1959–2001, Oblastní galerie v Liberci
- 2006 Lubomír Přibyl: Prostorové konfigurace, Galerie Gambit, Praha
- 2007 Lubomír Přibyl: Grafika, Geofyzikální ústav AV ČR, Praha
- 2009 Lubomír Přibyl: Grafika, Galerie AMB - Sbor kněze Ambrože Církve československé husitské, Hradec Králové
- 2009 Lubomír Přibyl, Haus der Moderner Kunst, Staufen
- 2009 Lubomír Přibyl: Obrazy a grafika, Galerie Dion, Praha
- 2011 Lubomír Přibyl: Grafika, objekty, Galerie moderního umění v Hradci Králové, Hradec Králové
- 2011 Lubomír Přibyl: Obrazy a grafika, Galerie FONS firmy STAPRO s.r.o., Pardubice
- 2011 Lubomír Přibyl: Obrazy a materiálové tisky / Paintings and material prints, Brno Gallery CZ, Brno
- 2012 Lubomír Přibyl: Obrazy a materiálové tisky / Paintings and material prints, Topičův klub, Praha[12]
- 2017 Lubomír Přibyl a Robert Urbásek: Síla jedné barvy, Galerie Závodný, Mikulov
- 2017 Lubomír Přibyl, Galerie Hollar

== Sources ==
=== Monographs ===
- Lubomír Přibyl, texts by Jiří Fiala, Jiří Valoch, Gallery Publishing House, Prague 2006, ISBN 80-86990-02-8

=== Catalogues ===
- Lubomír Přibyl, 1959, Dvořák František, cat. 4 p., Divadlo Rokoko, Prague
- Lubomír Pribyl: Paintings and Prints from 1952 to 1960, 1960, Dvořák František, Holub Miroslav, cat. 16 p., E. F. Burian Theatre, Prague
- Lubomír Přibyl, 1964, Miler Karel, cat. 8 p., Fronta Gallery, Prague
- Lubomír Pribyl: Works from the Last Years, 1989, double sheet, Institute of the Czechoslovak Academy of Sciences, Prague
- Lubomír Přibyl: Paintings and Prints, 1995, Machalický Jiří, cat. 12 p., Galerie bratří Čapků, Prague
- Lubomír Přibyl: Graphics 1959 - 1998, 2001, Machalický Jiří, 11 sheets, Gallery of Fine Arts in Cheb
- Lubomír Pribyl: Morphomatic Networks: A Selection of Prints from 1966 to 2002, 2002, cat. 28 p., Gallery of the Information Centre of Palacký University, Olomouc
- Lubomír Přibyl: Graphics 1959–2001, 2005, Kroupová Markéta, cat. 8 p., Regional Gallery in Liberec
- Lubomír Přibyl: Graphics, 2007, Fiala Jiří, Sedláček Zbyněk, cat. 6+1 p., Geophysical Institute of the CAS, Prague
- Lubomír Přibyl: Graphics, 2009, cat. 6 p., CON.FRONT.ART, o. s., Hradec Králové
- Lubomír Přibyl: Paintings and Material Prints, 2011, Víchová Czakó Ilona, cat. 6 p., 1. Art Consulting Brno - Prague
- Lubomír Přibyl: Graphics, objects, 2011, Příkazská Petra, cat. 28 p., 33 reproductions, Gallery of Modern Art in Hradec Králové, ISBN 978-80-85025-91-0
- Laureates of the Vladimír Boudník Award, Inter-Kontakt-Grafik Praha, 2012, cat. 40 p. (LP, text by Jiří Valoch, p. 25)

=== Encyclopedia ===
- Rostislav Švácha, Marie Platovská (ed.), History of Czech Visual Art, vol. VI/1, (Panorama of Graphic Art of the 1960s, Jiří Machalický), pp. 341–342, vol. VI/2, (Language of Geometry, Jiří Valoch), pp. 586, 587, 589 Academia Prague 2007, ISBN 978-80-200-1489-4
- Anděla Horová (ed.), Nová encyklopedie českého výtvarného umění, vol. II. p. 660 (entry Josef Hlaváček), Academia Praha 1995, ISBN 80-200-0521-8
- Jiri Siblik, Twentieth-century Prints, Hamlyn Publishing Group, London 1970, pp. 128–129

=== Articles (selection) ===
- Vladislav Merhaut, Přibyl = řád, Tvorba, 15, 1990, s. 16
- Zbyněk Sedláček, Lubomír Přibyl, Ateliér, 19, 1995
- Jiří Valoch, Dvě možnosti jazyka geometrie, Ateliér, 13, 1998, s. 3
- Tomáš Pospiszyl, Přibylova úhlopříčka – poodkrytí dějin českého modernismu, A2 kulturní týdeník, 11, 2007, s. 9
- Hans-Dieter Fronz, Es geht ums Ganze, Badische Zeitung, 28 May 2009
- Jiří Machalický, Rhythm of Lines and Shapes. Lubomír Pribyl has always worked independently of changing trends. Lidovky.cz 27. 1. 2020
