= Lubomír Vosátko =

Czech ice hockey player (born 1977)

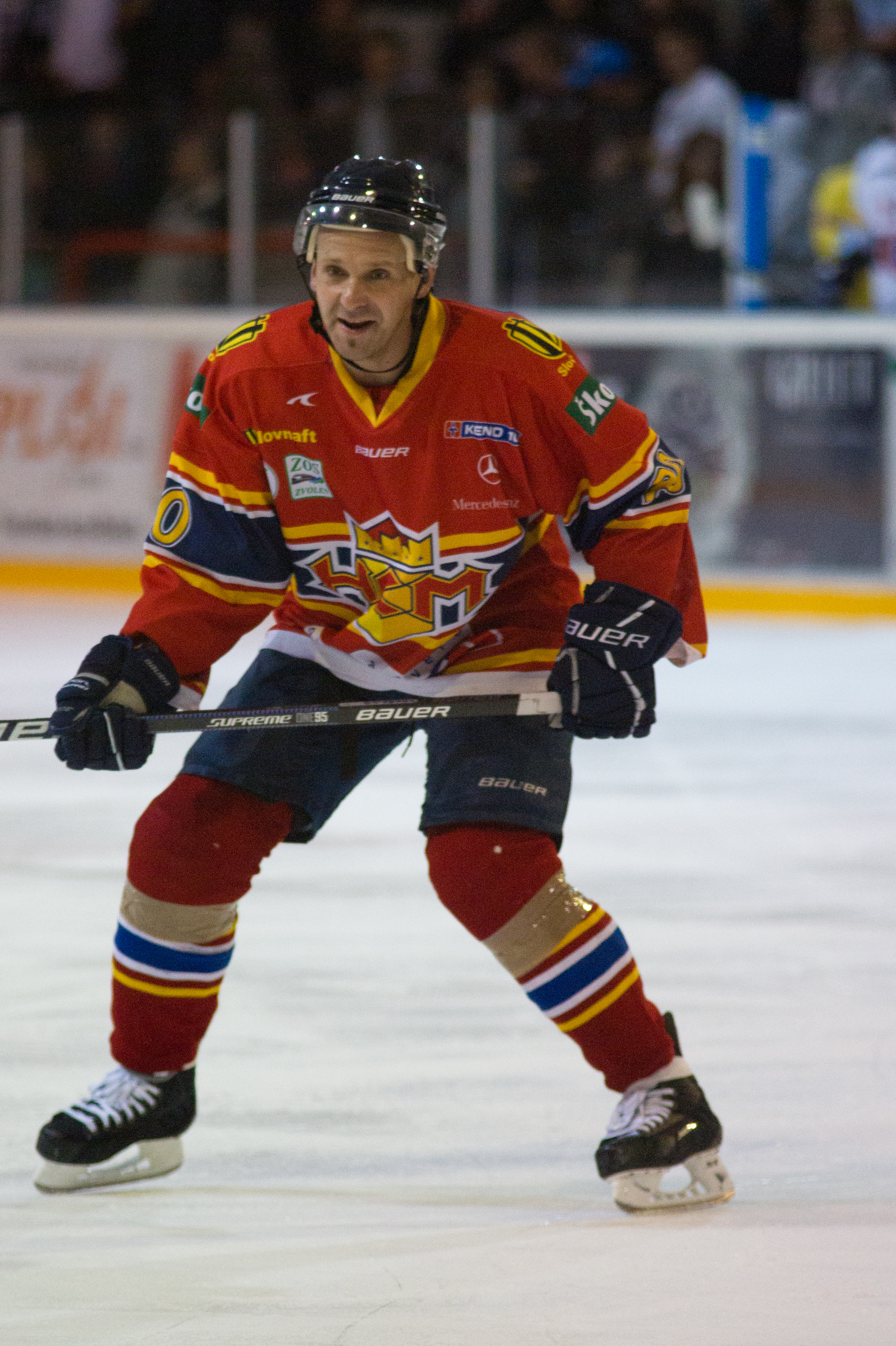
- Born: January 26, 1977 (age 48); Prague, Czechoslovakia
- Height: 5 ft 11 in (180 cm)
- Weight: 194 lb (88 kg; 13 st 12 lb)
- Position: Defence
- Shoots: Right
- Czech Extraliga team: HC Vítkovice
- Playing career: 2003–present

Lubomír Vosátko (born January 26, 1977) is a Czech professional ice hockey defenceman currently playing for HK Nitra. He played with HC Vítkovice in the Czech Extraliga during the 2010–11 Czech Extraliga season. He is currently playing for Polish team TH Unia Oświęcim.

== Career statistics ==
| | | | Regular season | | | | | Playoffs |
| Season | Team | League | GP | G | A | Pts | PIM | GP | G | A | Pts | PIM |
|---|---|---|---|---|---|---|---|---|---|---|---|---|
| 1996–97 | HC Sparta Praha U20 | Czech U20 | 11 | 0 | 1 | 1 | — | — | — | — | — | — |
| 1997–98 | HC MBL Olomouc | Czech2 | — | — | — | — | — | — | — | — | — | — |
| 1998–99 | HC MBL Olomouc | Czech2 | 47 | 1 | 4 | 5 | — | — | — | — | — | — |
| 1999–00 | HC Slezan Opava | Czech2 | 39 | 3 | 7 | 10 | 44 | 4 | 1 | 0 | 1 | 8 |
| 2000–01 | HC Slezan Opava | Czech2 | 47 | 4 | 10 | 14 | 52 | — | — | — | — | — |
| 2001–02 | HC Slezan Opava | Czech2 | 34 | 4 | 11 | 15 | 34 | 5 | 0 | 1 | 1 | 6 |
| 2001–02 | HC Minor 2000 Přerov | Czech3 | 5 | 0 | 1 | 1 | 6 | — | — | — | — | — |
| 2002–03 | HC Slezan Opava | Czech2 | 37 | 5 | 12 | 17 | 32 | — | — | — | — | — |
| 2003–04 | HC Slezan Opava | Czech2 | 35 | 1 | 8 | 9 | 30 | — | — | — | — | — |
| 2003–04 | HC Zlin | Czech | 17 | 0 | 1 | 1 | 8 | 5 | 0 | 0 | 0 | 6 |
| 2004–05 | HC Zlin | Czech | 42 | 0 | 1 | 1 | 28 | 14 | 1 | 0 | 1 | 18 |
| 2005–06 | HC Zlin | Czech | 52 | 5 | 11 | 16 | 64 | 6 | 0 | 0 | 0 | 6 |
| 2006–07 | HC Zlin | Czech | 38 | 4 | 6 | 10 | 82 | 5 | 0 | 1 | 1 | 2 |
| 2007–08 | HC Zlin | Czech | 50 | 5 | 6 | 11 | 70 | — | — | — | — | — |
| 2008–09 | HC Zlin | Czech | 1 | 0 | 0 | 0 | 4 | — | — | — | — | — |
| 2008–09 | HC Ocelari Trinec | Czech | 45 | 2 | 6 | 8 | 38 | 3 | 0 | 1 | 1 | 2 |
| 2009–10 | HC Ocelari Trinec | Czech | 1 | 0 | 0 | 0 | 0 | 1 | 0 | 0 | 0 | 2 |
| 2009–10 | HC Sumperk | Czech2 | 26 | 1 | 14 | 15 | 40 | — | — | — | — | — |
| 2010–11 | HKM Zvolen | Slovak | 44 | 1 | 2 | 3 | 24 | — | — | — | — | — |
| 2010–11 | HC Vitkovice | Czech | 10 | 0 | 3 | 3 | 10 | 16 | 1 | 3 | 4 | 14 |
| 2011–12 | Orli Znojmo | EBEL | 35 | 1 | 4 | 5 | 14 | — | — | — | — | — |
| 2011–12 | HKM Zvolen | Slovak | 15 | 0 | 6 | 6 | 10 | — | — | — | — | — |
| 2012–13 | HK Nitra | Slovak | 54 | 0 | 11 | 11 | 52 | 9 | 0 | 1 | 1 | 4 |
| 2013–14 | HC AZ Havířov 2010 | Czech2 | 51 | 4 | 13 | 17 | 44 | 4 | 0 | 0 | 0 | 2 |
| 2014–15 | LHK Jestřábi Prostějov | Czech2 | 10 | 0 | 0 | 0 | 10 | — | — | — | — | — |
| 2014–15 | TH Unia Oświęcim | Poland | 37 | 7 | 14 | 21 | 46 | 4 | 0 | 1 | 1 | 2 |
| 2015–16 | TH Unia Oświęcim | Poland | 42 | 10 | 20 | 30 | 30 | 5 | 3 | 0 | 3 | 12 |
| 2016–17 | TH Unia Oświęcim | Poland | 34 | 8 | 17 | 25 | 38 | 5 | 2 | 4 | 6 | 8 |
| 2017–18 | TH Unia Oświęcim | Poland | 32 | 1 | 11 | 12 | 63 | 6 | 0 | 1 | 1 | 6 |
| 2018–19 | HC Spartak Uherský Brod | Czech4 | — | — | — | — | — | — | — | — | — | — |
| Czech totals | | | 256 | 16 | 34 | 50 | 304 | 54 | 2 | 5 | 7 | 52 |
| Czech2 totals | | | 326 | 23 | 79 | 102 | 286 | 16 | 1 | 2 | 3 | 16 |
