= Ljubo =

Ljubo (Serbian: Љубо) is a South Slavic masculine given name. Notable people with the name include:

- Ljubo Babić (1890–1974), Croatian painter
- Ljubo Benčić (1905–1992), Croatian and Yugoslav football player
- Ljubo Boban (1933–1994), Croatian historian
- Ljubo Ćesić Rojs (born 1958), Croatian general and right-wing politician
- Ljubo Čupić (1913–1942), Montenegrin communist and war hero
- Ljubo Germič (born 1960), Slovenian politician and a member of the Slovenian National Assembly
- Ljubo Jurčić (born 1954), Croatian economist and former Croatian Minister of the Economy
- Ljubo Savić (1958–2000), Bosnian Serb military commander and politician
- Ljubo Miličević (born 1981), Australian football (soccer) player
- Ljubo Miloš (1919–1948), Croatian World War II official and concentration camp commandant executed for war crimes
- Ljubo Sirc CBE (1920–2016), British-Slovene economist and famous dissident of the former Yugoslavia
- Ljubo Vukić (born 1982), Croatian handball player
- Ljubo Wiesner (1885–1951), Croatian poet

== See also ==
- Ljubomir
- Lyuboslav
