= Ljupka =

Ljupka is a Croatian and Macedonian female given name.

Those with the name include:

- Ljupka Dimitrovska (1946–2016), Croatian-Macedonian singer
- Ljupka Gojić (born 1982), Croatian model and the face of Givenchy
- Ljupka Džundeva (1934–2018), Macedonian film and theater actress
