= Ljubiša =

Ljubiša (Serbian: Љубиша) is a Serbian masculine given name and a surname. It may refer to:

- Ljubiša Beara (1939–2017), Bosnian Serb who participated in the War in Bosnia and Herzegovina
- Ljubiša Broćić (1911–1995), Serbian football manager
- Ljubiša Diković (born 1960), Serbian general officer
- Ljubiša Dmitrović (born 1969), Serbian football player and manager
- Ljubiša Dunđerski (born 1972), former Serbian international football player
- Ljubiša Jokić (born 1958), former general in the Military of Serbia and Montenegro
- Visarion Ljubiša (1823–1884), the Metropolitan bishop of Orthodox church in Montenegro from 1882 to 1884
- Ljubiša Milojević (born 1967), former Serbian footballer who played as a forward
- Stjepan Mitrov Ljubiša (1824–1878), Montenegrin writer and politician
- Ljubiša Petruševski (died 2002), Serbian oboist and the Dean of the Faculty of Music in Belgrade
- Ljubiša Rajković (born 1950), Serbian defender who played for SFR Yugoslavia
- Ljubiša Ranković (born 1973), former Serbian footballer
- Ljubiša Samardžić (1936–2017), Serbian actor and director, who is best known as Šurda in Vruć vetar series
- Ljubiša Savić (1958–2000), former Bosnian Serb paramilitary commander and post-war politician
- Ljubiša Simić (born 1963), former boxer from Yugoslavia
- Ljubiša Spajić (1926–2004), Serbian footballer
- Ljubiša Stamenković (born 1964), Serbian football manager
- Ljubiša Stanković (born 1960), Montenegrin scientist and diplomat
- Ljubiša Stevanović (1910–1978), Serbian footballer
- Ljubiša Stojanović (1952–2011), Serbian singer from Leskovac
- Ljubiša Tumbaković (born 1952), a Serbian soccer manager
- Ljubiša Vukelja (born 1983), Serbian football player
